= Constitution of the late Roman Empire =

Unwritten guidlines for governance

The constitution of the late Roman Empire was an unwritten set of guidelines and principles passed down, mainly through precedent, which defined the manner in which the late Roman Empire was governed. As a matter of historical convention, the late Roman Empire emerged from the Roman Principate (the early Roman Empire), with the accession of Diocletian in AD 284, his reign marking the beginning of the Tetrarchy. The constitution of the Dominate outrightly recognized monarchy as the true source of power, and thus ended the facade of dyarchy, in which emperor and Senate governed the empire together.

Diocletian's reforms to the Imperial government finally put an end to the period when the old Republican magistracies (e.g. consuls and praetors) held real powers. From then, the consuls had almost no real duties beyond that of presiding at Senate meetings and the duties of the lesser magistrates were effectively just hosting various games, e.g. chariot racing. Most other lesser magistracies simply disappeared.

Diocletian attempted to reform the Imperial system itself into a structure in which four emperors, consisting of two Augusti and two Caesares, each governed one fourth of the Empire. Known as the Tetrarchy, this constitutional structure, however, failed to even outlast Diocletian, who lived to see the collapse of his system and the civil wars that followed in his retirement after abdication in AD 305.

He also enacted major administrative reforms to the Empire. His division of the Empire into east and west, with each half under the command of a separate emperor, remained with brief interruptions of political unity. Although it remained the sole capital until Constantinople was elevated to that status in 359, the city of Rome ceased to be the seat of the Imperial government which in the West was usually in Mediolanum (now Milan), or sometimes in Augusta Treverorum (now Trier) if an emperor was resident there, or wherever the emperor happened to be since 4th century emperors moved within their realms, though Rome still had had its own Praefectus urbi above all other municipal governors and mayors and also its own Senate with Imperial level above all other municipal councils (except that of Constantinople from 359), maintaining the de jure capital status.

A vicar, later two vicars under Praetorian Prefect of Italy, headed the imperial administration of Italy, one in suburbicarian Italy (south of the Apennines and the Islands) and the other in Annonarian Italy (north of the Apennines and Raetia). The Senate and executive magistrates continued to function as Diocletian's constitution had originally specified. Diocletian's civil and military divisions of the empire remained in effect with little change though Upper Egypt from the mid-fifth was governed by a general, the dux, who also exercised civilian authority over the population. Later emperor Constantine would modify Diocletian's constitution by changing the roles of officials somewhat but not the administrative framework. It was not until Justinian I 527-565 that major changes that saw the near abolition of the regional tier of officials, and severe weakening of the Treasury (sacrae largitones) and Crown Estates.

== Augusti and Caesares ==
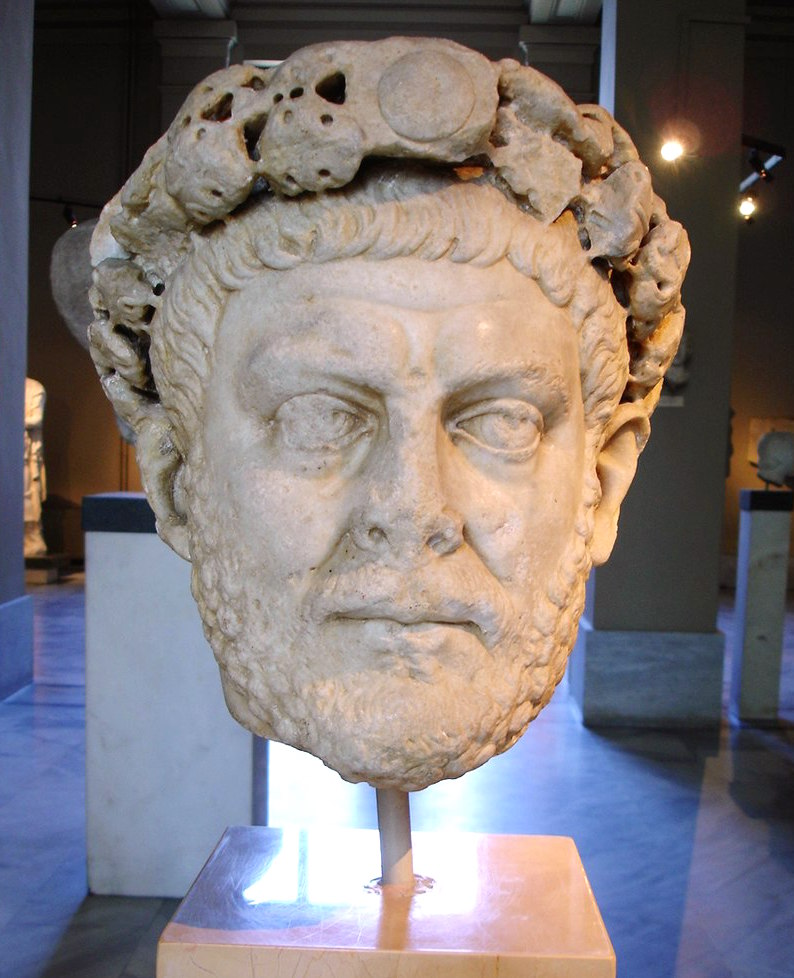
Roman emperor Diocletian, who framed the constitution of the Tetrarchy

Under Diocletian's new constitution, power was shared between two emperors called Augusti. The establishment of two co-equal Augusti marked a rebirth of the old republican principle of collegiality, as all laws, decrees, and appointments that came from one of the Augusti, were to be recognized as coming from both conjointly. One Augustus was to rule the western half of the Empire, and the other Augustus was to rule the eastern half of the Empire. Diocletian made Maximian his co-Augustus, and gave him the Western Empire, while Diocletian took the Eastern Empire. Diocletian made Nicomedia his capital, and Maximian made Milan his capital. To make the two halves symbolically appear to be one, Diocletian called his territory patres Orientis, while Maximian called his territory patres Occidentis.

The Augusti were legally distinct from the old Princeps (Roman emperors under the Principate), because under the Principate, the Princeps took the place of the old republican magistrates. When a Princeps issued a decree, that decree was only valid so long as that Princeps was Emperor, whereas in contrast, under the Republic, any decree issued by a magistrate was only good so long as that magistrate was in office. Under the Republic and the Principate, only the Senate and legislative assemblies were continuous institutions, and thus only they could pass laws that remained in effect indefinitely. Under Diocletian's new Tetrarchy, the Augusti took the place of the Senate and the assemblies, and thus any decree of an Augustus remained in force even after that particular emperor left office. Such an act could only be invalidated by a future emperor. The logical extension of this concept meant that neither a magistrate, the assemblies, nor the senate, could legally restrain the emperor.

The old republican magistrates, as well as the Princeps, both had legal status. Under the Republic, the state gave the magistrates the authorization to hold their office, while under the Principate, the state gave the Princeps the legal authorization to be emperor. Any Augusti, in contrast, did not need authorization from the state to be emperor, because the Augusti became the state itself. The higher authority of the Augusti was illustrated by their robes (which were trimmed with precious stones) and the imperial diadem, as well as the elaborate ceremony required of anyone who approached them. Unlike the old Princeps, the Augusti were viewed as being more than mortal, which was illustrated by the honors that they received. These honors had, in the past, been reserved only for the Gods. While emperors had received such honors in the past, they only received these honors after their death, and yet, the Augusti could receive such honors while they were still alive.

In 293, Diocletian and Maximian appointed two Caesares, which resulted in an arrangement known as the "Tetrarchy" ("rule by four"). The Caesares were subordinate to their Augusti, and the only authority that they had was that which had been given to them by their Augusti. Their status was so inferior to the Augusti that they received a fixed salary. The powers that were delegated to them usually included the right to hear appeals, and a set of provinces were often assigned to them so that they could supervise the governors of those provinces. The reason why Diocletian created the office of Caesar was to create a method by which orderly successions could occur, so that when one Augustus died, one of the two Caesares replaced that Augustus. When a new Caesar was appointed, his Augustus adopted him. Diocletian had hoped that the Augusti would jointly resign at a given point in time, and allow their Caesares to replace them.

== Administration of the Empire ==
Diocletian separated the civil administrative apparatus and the military one in order to mitigate the risk that future generals might attempt to seize the throne through force, and then he reorganized both of them. While changes were made by subsequent Emperors, the basic structure established by Diocletian would govern the Empire, until its eventual fall in the West during the 5th century, and its overall reform in the East during the reign of Heraclius in 7th century. The government of the Empire was divided (in both civil and military structures) between central and provincial levels. The central government general refers to those civil officials directly associated with the Emperor's court and the highest-ranking military officers. The provincial government includes all levels of provincial governors and local military commanders.

=== The Imperial Court ===
The central government of the Roman Empire consisted of the Imperial Court. At the top of the central government was the Emperor himself. From his presence all imperial authority flowed, both civil and military. The edicts of the Emperor were binding upon all persons throughout the Empire. To support the Emperor in the administration of the Empire, the Emperor was attended by numerous Court officials ("comes" or "counts").

Chief among these court officials was the Imperial Chancellor ("magister officiorum"). He was a kind of Interior Minister for State Security. His post had started out rather lowly as a tribune of the Palace Guard who was elevated by Constantine the Great in 320 AD to oversee the imperial secretariats. He functioned as a watchdog head of administration, although not able to order other branches of the administration such as the prefectures, Treasury and Crown Estates what to do without direct orders from the emperor. Ranked as a Count of the Empire, the Chancellor oversaw the entire civil service, the officia (however, the prefects and his subordinates had jurisdiction over staffs in civil and criminal suits). They were "the emperors' eyes" according to the orator, Libanius. The Chancellor's portfolio include a significant number of functions handled by modern government officials. The Chancellor was responsible for conducting court ceremonies and regulated audiences with the Emperor. All correspondences with foreign powers were sent by and embassies of foreign powers to the Emperor were received by the Chancellor. The Chancellor commanded the Imperial Intelligence Service corps of ("Agentes in rebus"), 'men of state affairs,' who handled communications between the Emperor and provincial governments as well as gathering intelligence as the Emperor's administrative policing force. They were courier/bureaucrats often deputed to other departments on special assignments. From the early 340s senior agentes in rebus were appointed as heads of the offices, principes, of prefects, vicars and two of three proconsulates (not of Asia). All business coming in and out of these offices were vetted by this officials; the wrote confidential reports the chancellor. Nothing could be issued without their counter-signature. Their small personal staffs were not part of the office staffs they whose activity they monitored. It has debated to what degree vicars had control over the principes. Their presence in the prefectures and proconsular offices connected them directly to the palatine administration headed by the masters of the offices, but also to the prefects and indirectly to the regional comptrollers of the Treasury and Managers of the Crown Estates whose offices were almost all located in diocesan see cities which were destination points for masses of information for processing for the upper administration echelon with the emperors.

The Chancellors oversaw the Imperial Transportation Service ("Cursus publicus"). This was maintained by the prefecture and funded by provincials. Despite the name of State Post, it was privately operated under State direction. From the 340s its use was under the inspection of agentes in rebus deputed to and stationed the provinces with the governors. The system was made up of 'stationes,' guard stations, 'mutationes,' changing stations, and 'mansiones', larger facilities for overnight stays equipped often dining rooms and baths. these spread along the major road systems connecting the regions of the Roman world. The changing stations were 8–12 miles apart and the hotel/stables were generally 25–30 miles apart. These served as relay points and provided horses to dispatch riders (usually soldiers) and vehicles for Court officials. The Imperial Guard corps ("Scholae Palatinae") was under the Chancellor's command. The imperial armories, fabricae, were under the praetorian prefects and cloth/dye manufactories managed by the Treasury (oddly 3 of them were managed by the Crown Estate (69 in the West are listed; the list in the East is incomplete). The armories passed under the control of the magister officiorum by 390. In 442 he was made inspector-general of the frontier army units, a responsibility which had been the prefects and their vicars.

The Chancellor had direct control over the Imperial Chancellory, the central administrative organ of the Empire which coordinated the civilian functions of the Empire and provided direct support to the Emperor. The Imperial Chancellory was divided into four bureaus (the "sacra scrinia"): the Clerical Bureau ("scrinium memoriae"), the Correspondence Bureau ("scrinium epistularum"), the Legal Bureau ("scrinium libellorum"), and the Arrangement Bureau ("scrinium dispositionum"). Each of these bureaus supported a Bureau Director ("magistri scriniorum") who reported to the Chancellor, but were not totally under his control until the early 5th century.

- The Clerical Bureau drafted official documents for the Emperor's approval, such as imperial decrees and appointments, and served as the central Imperial Archive
- The Correspondence Bureau received and responded to correspondence from public officials to the Emperor, managed representation with foreign powers, and served as the imperial translation service
- The Legal Bureau handled the various legal petitions the Emperor received, such as appeals from lower courts
- The Arrangement Bureau oversaw the administrative matters the Emperor faced while traveling

The Judge of the Imperial Court ("Quaestor sacri palatii") was the Empire's top legal official and was responsible for the administration of the justice throughout the Empire. Selected from those with significant legal training, the Judge served as the Emperor's chief legal advisor and was responsible for overseeing the enactment of legislation and for drafting imperial decrees. Beginning in early 5th century, he presided over the Empire's supreme tribunal, which heard appeals from the various lower courts of the Empire.

One of the highest ranking court official was the Imperial Chamberlain ("Praepositus sacri cubiculi"). The Chamberlain, usually a eunuch, managed the daily operations of the Imperial Palace. He oversaw the palace servants ("cubicularii"), also eunuchs, and was responsible for the imperial bedchamber, wardrobe and receptions. While the Chamberlain technically possessed no administrative authority outside of managing the imperial household, his daily and intimate contact with the Emperor granted him great influence over other Court officials, allowing him de facto coordinating authority over all Court officials. In the case of weak Emperors, the Chamberlain's influence made him the most powerful man in the Empire. However, should the Emperor be a powerful force, the Chamberlain's role in the administration of the Empire was minimal.

Fiscal administration lay with the Count of the Imperial Treasury ("Comes sacrarum largitionum") who oversaw the collection and distribution of Imperial money taxes, managed the Imperial Treasury, and controlled Imperial mints, state-run mills and textile factories, and state-run mining facilities. He was the chief financial officer until Constantine displaced him with the praetorian prefects. The Count also exercised judicial functions as they related to fiscal matters under his supervision, with no appeal of his decision. The other key financial officer was the Count of the Imperial Estates ("Comes rerum privatarum") who administered the private property of the Emperor and managed all Imperial estates, including the collection of rent derived therefrom. The praetorian prefects, vice-regents, however, had control over taxes paid in kind and the separate military Annona tax, ta assessments and revisions, censuses the overall budgets composed on a diocesan basis subdivided by province and municipality or other local unit. They alone as for emperors could render final verdicts. From the late 320s fiscal appeal cases of the SL and RP were taken by the prefects, the vicars, proconsuls and urban prefects from their respective lower provincial and regional administrative courts. In 385 the two counts were allowed once again to receive appeals directly from their own lower-rung administrative courts after 60. Until then they had acted solely in an advisory capacity to the emperors to whom they represented their own interests as did the SL comptrollers and RP managers before the vicars and the other above-named officials, in regard to the restoration of authority.

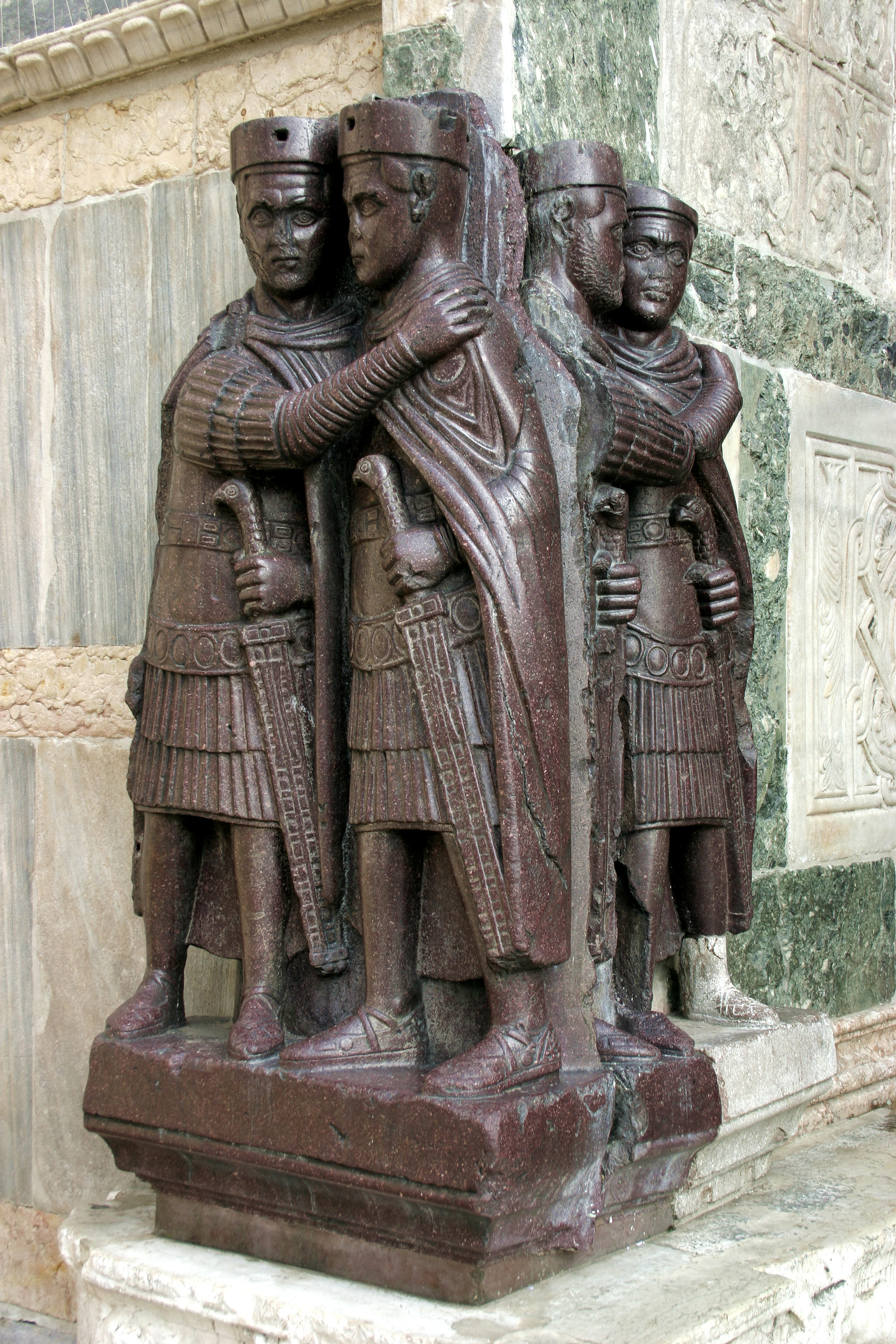
The first tetrarchs of the constitution of the Tetrarchy

=== Provincial government ===
When Diocletian reformed the administrative machinery of the Empire, he stripped the civilian administrators of their military powers (granting them instead to distinct offices). Additionally, he further divided the various provinces into smaller units, effectively doubled the number of provinces from fifty to over a hundred. To this new organization he imposed two new bureaucratic levels between the Emperors and the provinces: the Prefectures and the Dioceses. Diocletian grouped these hundred provinces into twelve Dioceses, which were then grouped into four Prefectures. The result was that the units of government were much smaller, and thus more manageable, than they had been before Diocletian's reforms. This not only made administration of the Empire easier but also helped to minimize the risk of revolt.

The four Prefectures, each led by a civilian Praetorian Prefect ("praefecti praetorio"), served as the highest level of provincial government. The Prefects were the Emperor's top administrators, ranking just below the Emperor himself in dignity. While initially serving as the Emperor's second in command in all matters of imperial administration (military, civil, judicial, taxation, etc.), the Prefects gradually had portions of their authority stripped from them and given to other offices: the Masters of the Soldiers for military affairs and the Imperial Chancellor for central civilian administration. These reforms were the result of both the lack of officials suitable for the prefect's wide-ranging tasks, and of the desire to reduce the potential challenge to the Emperor's authority posed by a power Prefect. The civilian powers of the Prefects were still vast, however, as they could nominate individuals to fill a gubernatorial vacancy, supervise the conduct of the governors, or even dismiss a governor. Prefects could also interpret the law, hear appeals, control finances, and some were even assigned military responsibilities. The powers of the Prefects were so extensive that Diocletian only allowed each Prefect to remain in office for a short period of time. The four Prefectures were called Orientis, Illyrici, Italiae, and Galliarum, with Constantinople, Sirmium, Milan, and Treves constituting the capitals of the respective Prefectures.

The cities of Rome and Constantinople both were exempt from the control of a Praetorian Prefect and instead were controlled by their own civilian governors answering directly to the Emperor. These two Prefects of the City ("Praefectus urbi") were responsible for the civilian administration of their respect city, presided over their respective Senate, and served as the chief judge for civil and criminal cases within the city. The Prefects commanded the Urban Cohorts ("Cohortes urbanae") and the City Watchmen ("Vigiles") in order to maintain order and security within the city. The Prefect also oversaw maintenance of the city's aqueducts and supervised the markets. One of his most important duties was to oversee his respective city's grain supply.

Ranking between the Prefectures and the provinces were the Dioceses. Each Dioceses was led by a civilian governor known as a Vicar ("Vicarius" meaning "deputy [of the Praetorian Prefect]"). Each Vicar was appointed by the Emperor upon the recommendation of the respective Prefect, and held the rank of Count Second Class.

Ranking directly below the Vicar were the provincial governors, who were appointed by the Emperor and held various titles. All provincial governors were Counts Third Class. The highest ranking provincial governors were the Proconsuls who governed the provinces of Africa, Asia, and Archaea. These three provincial governors reported directly to the Emperor due to their strategic value.

All other provinces were administered by governors called Presidents ("Praeses"), judges (iudices) or moderators. The primary duties of the provincial governors were administrative, judicial and financial. The governor could issues decrees that, if approved by the Emperor, would become binding upon the province. The governor was also the highest judicial official of the province, with appeals heard by the vicar of the diocese or in dioceses governed by prefects.

=== Counts ===
Civilian and military administrators of the late Empire were generally ranked as Counts ("comes" meaning "companion [of the Emperor]"). The rank of Count began as title given to the Emperor's trusted officials as a mark of imperial confidence, and later developing into a formal rank. "Count" was not a hereditary title as was found in feudalism, but rather a rank associated within a distinct position within the imperial administration. All Counts were automatically members of the Senatorial Order. As the imperial system expanded, however, new offices were needed which resulted in the development of three classes within the rank of Count:

- Vir illustris – The "Illustrious Men", Counts First Class
- Vir spectabilis – The "Admirable Men", Counts Second Class
- Vir clarissimus – The "Most Notable Men", Counts Third Class

The most important Imperial Court positions, the highest-ranking military commanders, and the Imperial Chamberlain were all Counts First Class. Counts Second Class were the various Proconsuls, Vicars of the Dioceses, provincial military commanders, and others. Counts Third Class was the basic qualification to obtain entrance into the Senate and including the governorship of a province and other lower offices.

=== Military structure ===
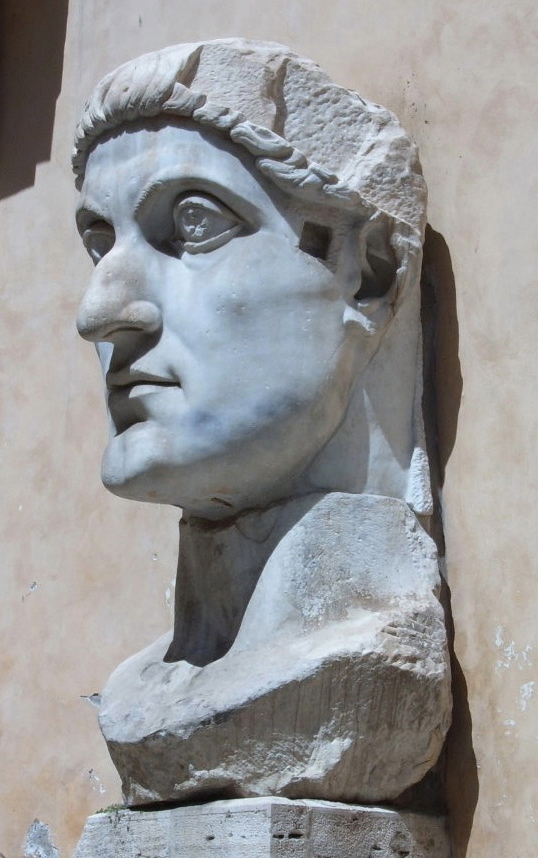
Roman Emperor Constantine, who reformed the constitution of the Tetrarchy

To a reformed civilian structure, Diocletian added a reorganized supreme military command. Two significant parts of the reform are apparent: the separation of military commanders from civil administration and the division of the army into two classes: the Field Armies ("comitatenses") and the Frontier Troops ("limitanei"). The Field Armies served as the Empire's strategic reserve to respond to crisis where it may arise whereas the Frontier Troops were permanently stationed along the Empire's borders ("limes"). Recruited from the ranks of the Field Armies were the Palace Troops units ("Palatini"), who accompanied the Emperor as he traveled around the Empire as were the successor of the Principate Praetorian Guard.

The supreme military commanders of the Late Empire was the Master of the Soldiers ("Magister Militum"). There were seven such Masters throughout the Empire (two in the West and five in the East). The establishment of solely military officials provided for a more professional military leadership. The Masters were all Counts First Class.

- Within the East, there were Masters of the Soldiers in Illyria, Thrace, and the East. Each of these three Masters exercised independent command over one of the three Field Armies of the Eastern Empire. There were also two Masters of the Soldiers in the Presence who accompanied the Eastern Emperor and who each commanded half of the Palace Troops. Each of the five Masters were coequally ranked among themselves.
- Within the West, there was a Master of Both Services (magister utriusque militiae) and a Master of the Horse. The Master of Both Services was the supreme military commander of the West, ranking only below the Emperor and above all other military commanders, and commander of half the Palace Troops. The Master of the Horse held command over half the Palace Troops and the Field Army of Gaul, but still under the command of the Master of Both Services.

To support the Masters of the Soldiers, the Empire established several Military Counts ("Comes rei militaris"). There were six such Military Counts throughout the Empire. The Military Counts were all Counts Second Class.

- Within the East, there was only one Military Count: the Military Count of Egypt ("Comes rei militaris Aegypti"). Unlike the Military Counts of the West, this Count commanded the Frontier Troops stationed in Egypt and reported directly to the Eastern Emperor.
- Within the West, there were six such Military Counts, one for each of the five Field Armies in Illyria, Africa, Tingitania, Hispania, and Britannia. The sixth military count, the Count of the Saxon Shore ("comes littoris Saxonici per Britanniam"), commanded Frontier Troops along both sides of the English Channel and reported to the Count of Britannia. The five regular Military Counts reported to the Master of Both Services

The various Frontier Troops were under the command of Dukes ("duces limitis" or "border commanders"). These commanders were the spiritual successor of the Imperial Legates ("Legatus Augusti pro praetore") of the Principate. Most Dukes were given command of forces in a single province, but a few controlled more than one province. In the East, the Dukes reported to the Master of the Soldiers of their district whereas in the West they reported to their respective Military Count.

== Senate and magistrates ==
The removal of the seat of government from Rome reduced the Roman Senate to a municipal body, an image that was reinforced when the Emperor Constantine later created a similar body in Constantinople. Diocletian also discontinued the practice of having the Senate ratify the Imperial powers of a new emperor. Going back to the founding of the city, control of the state was considered to return to the Senate whenever the chief magistracy became vacant, and so this particular reform robbed the Senate of its status as the depository of supreme power. Diocletian's reforms also ended whatever fiction had remained that the Senate had substantive legislative powers, and since the magistracies had become meaningless, the electoral powers of the Senate had no real meaning. The Senate did retain its legislative powers over public games and the senatorial order, as well as the power to try cases, especially treason, if the Emperor gave permission.

The executive magistrates had been little more than municipal officials since long before Diocletian became Emperor, and so Diocletian's reforms simply declared this openly. The consul now could only preside over the Senate, and the Praetor and Quaestor could only manage public games, although the Praetor did retain some limited judicial authority. All other magisterial offices disappeared. The first two "Roman consuls" in a given year, the consules ordinarii, were appointed by the Emperor, and their term now ended on April 21, while all other consuls in a given year (the less-prestigious consules suffecti) were elected by the Senate. The Senate also elected "Praetors" and "Quaestors"', although the approval of the Emperor was required to take effect.

== See also ==
- Roman Kingdom
- Roman Republic
- Roman Empire
- Roman law
- Principate
- Tetrarchy
- Curia
- Roman consul
- Praetor
- Roman censor
- Quaestor
- Aedile
- Roman dictator
- Master of the Horse
- Roman Senate
- Cursus honorum
- Byzantine Senate
- Pontifex Maximus
- Princeps senatus
- Interrex
- Promagistrate
- Acta Senatus
- Plebeian Council
- Centuria
- Fall of the Western Roman Empire
  - Historiography of the fall of the Western Roman Empire

== Bibliography ==
- Bury, J B (2018) [1910]. The Constitution of the Later Roman Empire. CUP Archive. GGKEY:1LPTHZ0BA4T.
- Ihne, Wilhelm. Researches Into the History of the Roman Constitution. William Pickering. 1853.
- Johnston, Harold Whetstone. Orations and Letters of Cicero: With Historical Introduction, An Outline of the Roman Constitution, Notes, Vocabulary and Index. Scott, Foresman and Company. 1891.
- Mommsen, Theodor. Roman Constitutional Law. 1871-1888
- Tighe, Ambrose. The Development of the Roman Constitution. D. Apple & Co. 1886.
- Von Fritz, Kurt. The Theory of the Mixed Constitution in Antiquity. Columbia University Press, New York. 1975.
- The Histories by Polybius
- Cambridge Ancient History, Volumes 9–13.
- A. Cameron, The Later Roman Empire, (Fontana Press, 1993).
- M. Crawford, The Roman Republic, (Fontana Press, 1978).
- E. S. Gruen, "The Last Generation of the Roman Republic" (U California Press, 1974)
- F. Millar, The Emperor in the Roman World, (Duckworth, 1977, 1992).
- A. Lintott, "The Constitution of the Roman Republic" (Oxford University Press, 1999)

=== Primary sources ===
- Cicero's De Re Publica, Book Two
- Rome at the End of the Punic Wars: An Analysis of the Roman Government; by Polybius

=== Secondary source material ===
- Considerations on the Causes of the Greatness of the Romans and their Decline, by Montesquieu
- The Roman Constitution to the Time of Cicero
- What a Terrorist Incident in Ancient Rome Can Teach Us
