= Comes =

Latin word for companion, Roman court title

Comes (plural comites), translated as count, was a Roman title, generally linked to a comitatus or comital office.

The word comes originally meant "companion" or "follower", deriving from "com-" ("with") and "ire" ("go"). The special lasting meaning derives from the position of a follower within a comitatus, which was a retinue, or group of followers, such as those of magnates. In some instances these were sufficiently large and/or formal to justify specific denomination, such as a "cohors amicorum".

The word comes is the origin of the much later terms for counts within the medieval nobility, and counties as their territorial jurisdictions.

== Ancient Roman religion ==
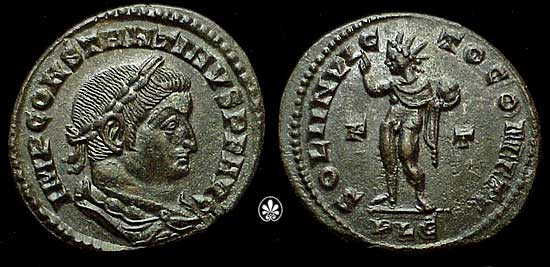
Constantine I SOLI INVICTO COMITI (Comes to Sol Invictus)

Comes was a common epithet or title that was added to the name of a hero or god in order to denote relation with another god.

The coinage of Roman Emperor Constantine I declared him "comes" to Sol Invictus ("Unconquered Sun") a qua god.

== Imperial Roman curial titles and offices styled comites ==
Historically more significant, "comes" became a secular title granted to trusted officials of the Imperial Curia ("Court"), present or former, and others as sign of Imperial confidence. It developed into a formal, dignitary title, derived from the "Companions" of Alexander the Great and rather equivalent to the Hellenistic title of "philos basilikos" or the paladin title of a knight of the Holy Roman Empire and a Papal Palatinus. Thus the title was retained when the titulary was appointed, often promoted, to an office away from court, frequently in the field or a provincial administration. Subsequently, it was thought logical to connect the title to specific offices that demanded an incumbent official of high dignity, and even to include it as part of the official title.

As the Imperial Roman Curia increased in number and assimilated all political power, the Roman Emperors instituted a casual practice of appointing faithful servants to offices. This had been done elsewhere, e. g. regarding the Prefect of the Praetorian Guard and the amici principis. As Imperial administration expanded, however, new offices became necessary and decentralization demanded modifications. The result was the institution of the rank of "comes".

The "comites", often translated as "counts", though they were neither feudal nor hereditary, became principal officials of the later Roman Empire. They held offices of all kinds from the army to the civil service, while retaining their direct access to the Emperor. Emperor Constantine I finalized them as the governmental echelon of "comites provinciarum" ("counts of the provinces"); The comites of the new echelon were assigned alongside the vicarii in the civil dioceses of the latter so that the comites became permanent fixtures of Imperial government. The comites were fully enumerated as early as the beginning of the AD 5th century in the Notitia Dignitatum, but as offices were later added, it is not historically exhaustive.

The following sections describe examples of the kinds of comites.

=== At court or in the Imperial domains ===
Several of the major departments of the Imperial Curia ('Court') and household had a principal official who was styled "comes" and assisted by an "officium" ('staff') very similar to that of a Roman governor. They included:

- Comes dispositonum: a deputy to the very powerful magister officiorum (master of offices) responsible for organizing the Imperial calendar and preparing the correspondence for distribution to the proper offices for transcription.
- Comes domesticorum: a vir illustris who was principal of the domestici, a corps of bodyguards of the Emperor who were stationed in the Imperial Palace. There were two of these comital commanders, the comes domesticorum equitum for the equestrian knights and the comes domesticorum peditum for the foot soldiers.
- Comes privatae largitionis: the custodian of the privy purse, who answered and was subordinate to the comes rerum privatarum (see next title).
- Comes rerum privatarum: a powerful Imperial official responsible for the private estates and holdings of the Emperor and his family (res privata). He maintained the properties and collected the rents, of which most were deposited in the Aerarium, i. e., the treasury of the public funds of the State, and some in the Fiscus, i. e., the treasury of privy funds of the Emperor that the comes privatae largitionis administered.
- Comes sacrarum largitionum: a vir illustris who was custodian of the sacrae largitiones ('sacred Largesses') of the Emperor and manager of the Imperial finances. He controlled all of the mints, each managed by a procurator; was the principal of numerous officials, including more procuratores, rationales, and praepositi, who collected senatorial taxes, custom duties, and some land taxes; was responsible for the yields of the mines; provided budgets for the civil service and armies; supplied all uniforms; and was competent for the minor offices of:
  - Comes auri: the official responsible for gold.
  - Comes sacrae vestis: the master of the wardrobe of the Emperor.
  - The 3 comites largitionum: the regional financial administrators of Italy, Africa, and Illyricum.
  - Comes commerciorum for Illyricum.
  - Comes metallorum per Illyricum: the official responsible for that region's gold mines.

Exceptionally, a gubernatorial position was styled comes. For example, the comes Orientis, actually one of the vicarii, was an official who controlled the large and strategically important Imperial Diocese of the East by supervising the governors of this collection of provinces, but he was in turn supervised by the praefectus praetorio Orientis.

Further, the principal officials of some less important governmental departments who were under the authority of otherwise styled, high ranking, territorial officials could be titled comes, e. g. under the praefectus urbi of Rome, himself a vir illustris, was a comes formarum, comes riparum et alvei Tiberis et Cloacarum ('count of the coast of the Tiber and the Canalisation'), and comes portus ('count of the port').

The title comes consistorianus or comes consistorialis indicated specially appointed members to the consistorium, the council of the Roman emperor's closest advisors.

=== Comes rei militaris ===
The comes rei militaris held martial appointments, and commanded comitatenses. He ranked superior to a dux but inferior to the magister peditum or magister equitum; he functioned as the superior of a series of military stations, each commanded by a praepositus limitis ("border commander") and/or as a unit commander, e. g., of tribunes of cohorts, of alae (auxiliary equivalents), of numeri, and in the Eastern Empire even of legions.

The Notitia Dignitatum of the early-5th century AD enumerates six such offices, being of the dignity of vir spectabilis, in the Western Empire: comes Italiae, comes Africae, comes Tingitaniae, comes Tractus Argentoratensis, comes Britanniarum and comes Litoris Saxonici; as well as two in the Eastern Empire: comes (limitis) Aegypti and comes Isauriae.

- Comes Africae: official responsible for the defense of Roman Africa.
- Comes tractus Argentoratensis: official responsible for the defense of part of Gallia.
- Comes Avernorum: official responsible for the defense of the other part of Gallia.
- Comes Britanniarum: official responsible for the defense of Britannia. This office presumably expired c. 410 AD, when the last Roman troops left that province.
- Comes Litoris Saxonici per Britanniam: official responsible for the defense of the Saxon shore of Britannia.
- Comes Hispaniarum: official responsible for the defense of Hispania.

As the number of comites increased, that dignity became devalued. This resulted in the introduction of classes of comites, denominated and ranked the first, second, and third "ordines".

=== Comites dominorum nostrorum ===
The comites dominorum nostrorum (plural of comes dominorum nostrorum; lit. 'Companions of Our Lords [Emperors]') were a mounted Imperial bodyguard during the tetrarchy of Emperor Diocletian in circa 300 AD.

== Medieval adaptations of comital offices ==
=== Gothic Comites ===
The Goths that ruled Spain and Italy followed the Roman tradition of granting the title of "comes" to the various principals of the departments of their royal households, including but not limited to the:

- Comes Cubiculariorum: Count in charge of the chamberlains (L. cubicularii).
- Comes Scanciorum: the Count who commanded the cup bearers.
- Comes Stabulorum: the Count who commanded the equerries and stables.
- Comes Notariorum: the Count who commanded the chancery, i. e., the writing office.
- Comes Thesaurorum: the Count who commanded the officials of the treasury.

=== Frankish Gaugraf ===
The Frankish kings of the Merovingian dynasty retained much of Roman administration, including the office and title of "comes", the original meaning of which they preserved, i. e., a companion of the king and a royal servant of high dignity. Under the early Frankish kings some comites did not have definite functions: they were merely attached to the person of the King and executed his orders. Others filled the highest offices, e. g. the Comes Palatii and Comes Stabuli (from which the contemporary title of "constable" derives).

Yet other comites served as regional officials. For administrative purposes, the Merovingian kingdoms were still divided into small Roman districts denominated "pagi" (hence the French "pays"), or similarly sized new creations "Gaue". These were smaller than the old Roman civitates ("cities", or polities) which became the basis of the new medieval bishoprics. In Carolingian times, the governor of a pagus was a Comes, corresponding to the German Graf. The King appointed the comites to serve at his pleasure. The modern German-derived term sometimes for a count who governed a whole gau is "Gaugraf", and a gau containing several counties is sometimes called a "Grossgau".

The essential competences of the comes were comprehensive in his pagus: martial, judicial, and executive; and in documents he is often described as the "agens publicus" ("public agent") of the King or "judex publicus/fiscalis" ("royal judge"). He was at once public prosecutor and judge, and was responsible for the execution of the sentences as well. As the delegate of the executive power, he had the right to exercise the "bannis regis" ("royal ban"), which gave him the right to command his military in the name of the King and to act as necessary to preserve the peace. As the King's representative, he exercised the royal right of protection ("mundium regis") of churches, widows, orphans, and the like. He enjoyed a triple "wergeld", but had no definite salary, being remunerated by receipt of specific revenues, which system contained the germs of discord, on account of the confusion of his public and private obligations.

According to philologists, the Anglo-Saxon word "gerefa", denoting "illustrious chief", however, is not connected to the German "Graf", which originally meant "servant"; compare the etymologies of the words "knight" and "valet". It is the more curious that the "gerefa" should end as a subservient reeve while the "graf" became a noble count.

=== Feudalism ===
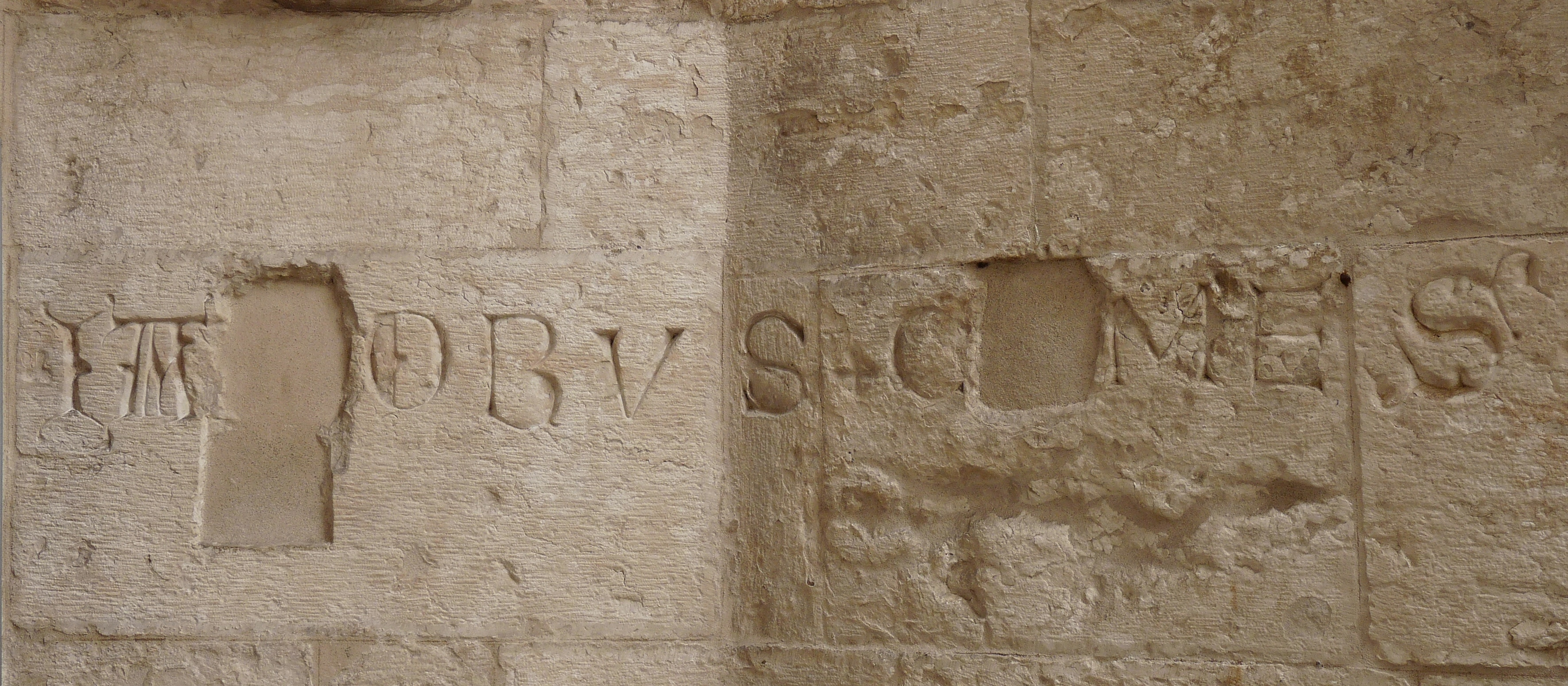
13th-century inscription in Trento Cathedral, reading Iacobus comes, "Count James"

In the feudal tradition, Latin was, especially in law, the official language, and therefore the rendering in Latin was equal in importance to the vernacular title. Thus, "comes" has been used as the Latin equivalent, or part of it, of all titles of comital office, whether containing "count" or some other word etymologically derived from "comes" or "graf". Similarly, it is part of the rendering, not always exclusive, of derived inferior titles containing such words, notably "vicecomes" for "viscount" and "burgicomes" and "burgravio" for "burgrave".

== See also ==
- Aerarium
- Agentes in rebus
- Comitatenses
- Comitatus (Kingdom of Hungary)
- Congiarium
- Donativum
- Fiscus
- Mund (law)
- Rationalis
- A rationibus
- Realencyclopädie der classischen Altertumswissenschaft
- Roman finance
