= A rationibus =

Secretary of finance in the Roman Empire

The a rationibus was the secretary of finance in the Roman Empire and in charge of the imperial treasury, the fiscus. His responsibilities involved monitoring the state's revenues and expenditures and maintaining the accounts of the fiscus, giving the a rationibus considerable influence.

The role of the a rationibus was originally created by Augustus, who needed accurate and comprehensive accounts of the state's finances in order to exercise budgetary control, and was thus given to members of his household, probably freedmen. This role was then institutionalized in the position of the a rationibus, who was paid a salary by the aerarium and given an office in the Palatine bureaus, under Tiberius. Roman patrician families such as the Junii Silani may also have designated their accountants as "a rationibus", although this custom fell out of practice when the imperial office of the a rationibus became institutionalized and had vanished at the latest under Nero's reign. Within his role as accountant, the careful bookkeeping of military expenditures, the costs of the public distribution of grain, religious constructions and infrastructure projects, but also the embellishment of the imperial palace, and project public revenues, e.g. from the Empire's various mines, were among the a rationibus' most important tasks. Moreover, the a rationibus was also responsible for the behavior of the magistrates of the fiscus and public complaints were addressed to his office. The praepositus a rationibus was helped by his chief subordinate, the proximus a rationibus, and strongly relied on the continuous confidence of the emperor, as evidenced by the consequences of Tiberius Iul. Aug. lib.'s dismissal. Sometimes, the offices of the a rationibus and ab epistulis, the secretary in charge of the imperial correspondence, were joined, e.g. in the case of Tiberius Claudius Vibianus Tertullus.

The office of a rationibus was initially held by freedmen such as Pallas, Phaon, and the father of Claudius Etruscus. However, from the 2nd century AD on (i.e., around the reigns of Trajan and Hadrian), the position was occupied only by Equestrians (Equites) after the reputation of freedmen had been blackened due to their undue influence at the imperial court and several corruption affairs. The office of the a rationibus was abolished through Diocletian's tetrarchic reforms, which put the management of the imperial finances during the 4th and 5th century AD under the purview of the comes sacrarum largitionum (master of the sacred largess).

== See also ==
- A cognitionibus
- Comes
- Congiarium
- Rationalis
- Roman finance
