= Consistorium =

Political council in the Roman Empire

The sacrum consistorium or sacrum auditorium (from Latin: consistere, "discuss a topic"; Greek: θεῖον συνέδριον, romanized: theion synedrion, "sacred assembly") was the highest political council of the Roman Empire from the time of Constantine the Great on. It replaced the consilium principis that had existed during the Principate.

The council's powers and membership varied, being ultimately dependent on the emperor. The magister officiorum, the quaestor sacri palatii, the comes sacrarum largitionum, the comes rerum privatarum and a few other high court officials were ex officio members, but the emperor was free to appoint additional members. These were specially appointed comites consistoriani, who in the 6th century held the rank of vir spectabilis, as well as other officials or close associates who were appointed ad hoc to it. The council's proceedings differed depending on each emperor's administrative style, but generally it served as the scene of "deliberations about political and administrative matters as well as [...] court procedures and the particularly solemn sanctioning of imperial laws:, while at the same time being an avenue for its members to raise issues of concern to them and influence the emperor.

The term "sacrum consistorium" is also applied to a formal meeting of the College of Cardinals called by the pope (a Papal consistory), as when Pius XII created 24 new cardinals in 1953.
