= Roman finance =

Credit practices and financial system of ancient Rome

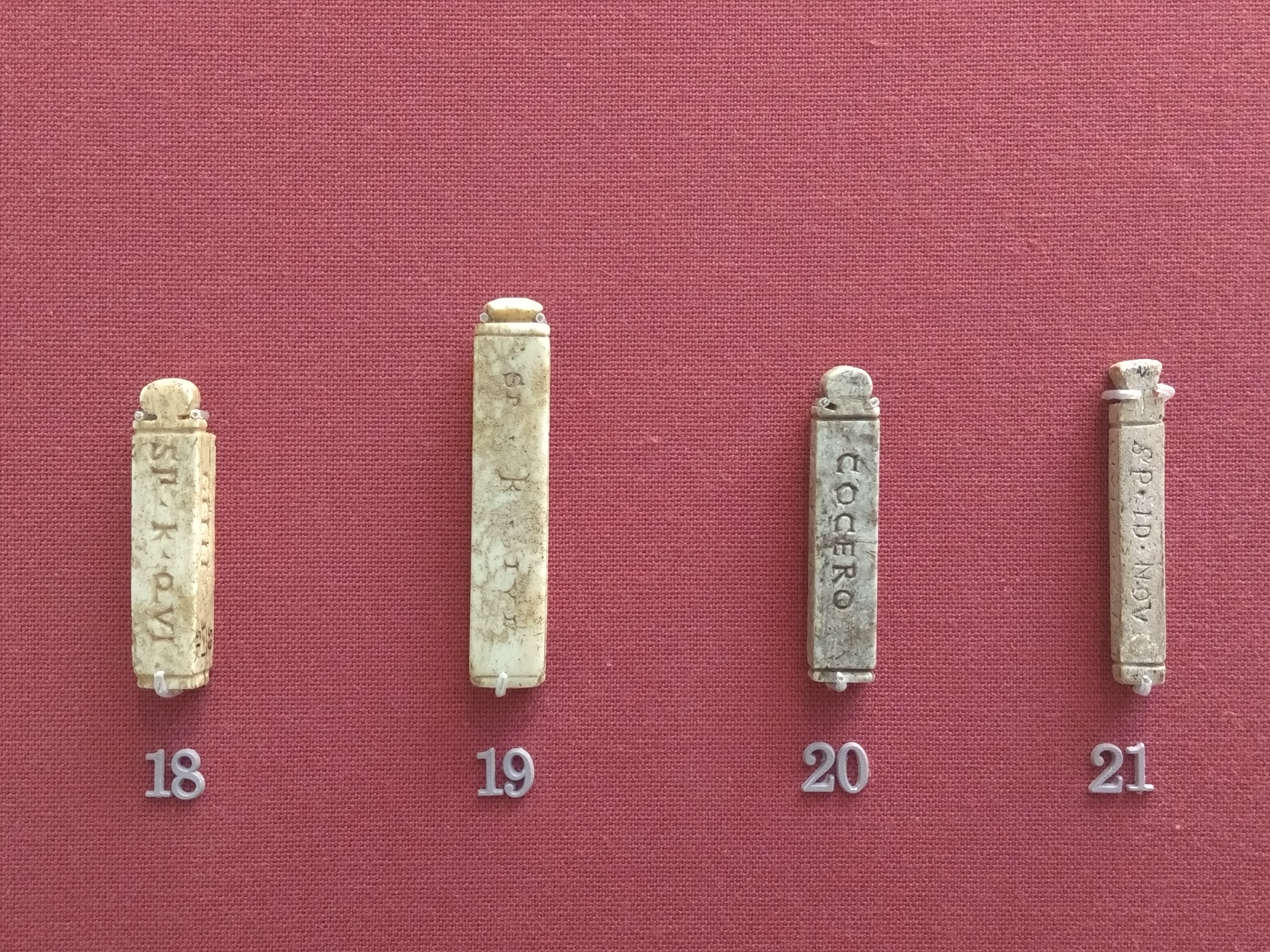
Ivory bankers' tallies used to seal bags of denarii that were checked for weight and purity of silver

The practices of ancient Roman finance, while originally rooted in Greek models, evolved in the second century BC with the expansion of Roman monetization. Roman elites engaged in private lending for various purposes, and various banking models arose to serve different lending needs.

== Private finance ==
=== Pooling capital ===
Before banks were established in Rome the Romans operated largely within the constraints of the property wealth of their own households. When household wealth was exhausted, the elites in Roman society often extended loans amongst themselves. The value of these loans to the lender was not always derived from interest payments, but rather from the social obligations that were an implication of being a lender. The formation of a societas allowed for coordination of resources among property-owners. Societates were groups who combined their resources to place a bid for a government contract, and then share in the resulting profit or loss.

The publicani (public contractors) were an early incarnation of societates, who bid for the right to collect taxes from the Roman provinces. Senators were not allowed to engage in trade, so it fell to the knights (equites) to bid on these contracts issued by the censors every five years. Banks were established in Rome, modelled upon their Greek counterparts, and introduced formalized financial intermediation. Livy is the first writer to acknowledge the rise of formal Roman banks in 310 BC.

Ancient Roman banks operated under private law, which did not have clear guidance on how to decide cases concerning financial matters. This forced Roman banks to operate entirely on their word and character. Bankers congregated around the arch of Janus to conduct their business and despite their informal location, were clearly professional in their dealings.

=== Private loans ===
Up until the dawn of the Roman Empire, it was common for loans to be negotiated as oral contracts. In the early Empire, lenders and borrowers began to adopt the usage of a chirographum (“handwritten record”) to record these contracts and use them for evidence of the agreed terms. One copy of the contract was presented on the exterior of the chirographum, while a second copy was kept sealed within two waxed tablets of the document, in the presence of a witness. Informal methods of maintaining records of loans made and received existed, as well as formal incarnations adopted by frequent lenders. These serial lenders used a kalendarium to document the loans that they issued to assist in tabulating interest accrued at the beginning of each month (Kalends).

Parties to contracts were supposed to be Roman citizens, but there is evidence of this boundary being broken. Loans to citizens were also originated from public or governmental positions. For example, the Temple of Apollo is believed to have engaged in secured loans with citizens’ homes being used as collateral. Loans were more rarely extended to citizens from the government, as in the case of Tiberius who allowed for three-year, interest-free loans to be issued to senators in order to avert a looming credit crisis.

=== Deferred payment ===
There is sufficient evidence of deferred payments and financing arrangements to be negotiated for large purchases. Deferred payments were used in the auction of wine or oil that was "on the tree", not yet harvested or produced, requiring payment from the winning bidder, long after the auction had ended. Roman peasants who needed money to pay their taxes used an inverted form of this process, by selling the right to a portion of their harvest in the future, in exchange for cash in the present. The sulpicii arose as professional bankers in the first century AD. Among other forms of financial intermediation, they offered financing for speculators in grain markets.

== Public finance ==
For centuries the monetary affairs of the Roman Republic had rested in the hands of the Senate. These elite liked to present themselves as steady and fiscally conservative, but as the 19th-century historian of Rome Wilhelm Ihne remarked:

Though individually the Romans were exceedingly economical and careful in the management of their private property, the state as such was extravagant and careless with the state revenue. It was found impossible to protect the public property from being plundered by private individuals, and the feeling of powerlessness resulted in reckless indifference. It was felt that revenues which could not be preserved intact and devoted to the common good were of no value to the state and might as well be abandoned.

The aerarium (state treasury) was supervised by members of the government rising in power and prestige, the quaestors, praetors, and eventually the prefects. With the dawn of the Roman Empire, a major change took place, as the emperors assumed the reins of financial control. Augustus adopted a system that was, on the surface, fair to the Senate. Just as the world was divided in provinces designated as imperial or senatorial, so was the treasury. All tribute brought in from senatorially controlled provinces was given to the aerarium, while that of the imperial territories went to the treasury of the emperor, the fiscus.

Initially, this process of distribution seemed to work, although the legal technicality did not disguise the supremacy of the emperor or his often used right to transfer funds back and forth regularly from the aerarium to the fiscus. The fiscus actually took shape after the reign of Augustus and Tiberius. It began as a private fund (fiscus meaning purse or basket) but grew to include all imperial monies, not only the private estates but also all public lands and finances under the imperial eye.

The property of the rulers grew to such an extent that changes had to be made starting sometime in the 3rd century, most certainly under Septimius Severus. Henceforth, the imperial treasury was divided. The fiscus was retained to handle actual government revenue, while a patrimonium was created to hold the private fortune, which was inherited by the Emperors successor. There is a considerable question as to the exact nature of this evaluation, involving possibly a res privata so common in the Late Empire.

Just as the Senate had its own finance officers, so did the emperors. The head of the fiscus in the first years was the rationalis, originally a freedman due to Augustus' desire to place the office in the hands of a servant free of the class demands of the traditional society. In succeeding years the corruption and reputation of the freedman forced new and more reliable administrators. From the time of Hadrian (r. 117–138), any rationalis hailed from the Equestrian Order (equites) and remained so through the chaos of the 3rd century and into the age of Diocletian.

With Diocletian came a series of massive reforms, and total control over the finances of the Empire fell to the now stronger central government. Tax reforms made possible a real budget in the modern sense for the first time. Previously it had issued the tax demands to the cities and allowed them to allocate the burden. From now on the imperial government driven by fiscal needs dictated the entire process down to the civic level.

Under Constantine the Great, this aggrandizement continued with the emergence of an appointed minister of finance, the comes sacrarum largitionum ("Count of the Sacred Largesses"). He maintained the general treasury and the intake of all revenue until Constantine divided the treasury into three, giving the prefect, count, and the manager of the res privata their own treasuries. The treasury of the prefect was called the arca. His powers were directed toward control of the new sacrum aerarium, the result of the combination of the aerarium and the fiscus.

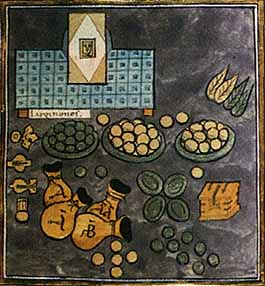
The insignia of the comes sacrarum largitionum in the Notitia Dignitatum: money bags and pieces of ore signifying his control over mines and mints, and the codicil of his appointment on a stand

The comes sacrarum largitionum was a figure of tremendous influence. He was responsible for all money taxes, examined banks, ran the mints and mines everywhere, weaving mills and dye works, paid the salaries and expenses of many departments of the state, the upkeep of imperial palaces and other public buildings, supplied the Courts with clothing and other items. To accomplish these many tasks, he was aided by a large central staff, a regional field force and small staffs in larger cities and towns.

Just below the comes sacrarum were the rationales, comptrollers, positioned in each diocese. They supervised the collection of all tribute, taxes, or fees. They were everywhere and omnipotent until Constantine demoted them after his reorganization of the palatine level ministries' competencies in the years 325–326 by restricting their activity to supervision of the collection of taxes collected in gold and silver performed by the governors under the general supervision of the vicars. The rationales lost the last of their provincial field force of procurators between 330 and 337.

Only the praetorian prefects were more powerful. His office, as vice-regent to the emperors, took precedence over all other civilian officials and military officers. They were chief finance officers of the Empire. They composed the global budget and set the tax rates across the board. Before Constantine's reforms they were directly responsible for the supply of the army, the annona militaris, which was a separate tax form the time of Diocletian in place of arbitrary requisitions.

The annona civilis, the general in kind taxes were turned over to the prefects alone. To their care was entrusted the supply of food stuffs to the capitals, the imperial armament factories, the maintenance of the state post. The magister officiorum ("Master of Offices"), who was a kind of Minister of the Interior and State Security and the comes rerum privatarum ("Count of the Private Fortune") could counter the political the comes sacrarum largitionum.

The magister officiorum made all the major decisions concerning intelligence matters was not a fiscal officer and could not interfere with the operation of the sacrae largitiones and the res privata. The comes sacrarum largitionum gradually lost power to the prefects as more and more in kind taxes of his department were converted to gold. By the 5th century their diocesan level staff were no longer of much importance, although they continued in their duties. However, the heads of the office continued to have power into the 430s in part because appellate jurisdiction in fiscal cases had been returned to them in 385.

The imperial estates and holdings were huge. Their res privata was directly under the management of the RP. The patromonium, or imperial inheritance were lands leased to individuals. Both were under the jurisdiction of the comes rerum privatarum. In the West the rents and tax income was shared with the sacrae largitionum but not in the East. In the East the palace administration took over gradually post-450 and the RP was finally dissolved by Justinian's successors.

== See also ==
- Agentes in rebus
- Comes
- Congiarium
- Donativum
- Rationibus
- Roman commerce
- Roman economy
