= Vir gloriosus =

Late Imperial Roman official rank

Vir gloriosus (lit. 'glorious man'; Greek: ἔνδοξος, endoxos) or gloriosissimus (lit. 'most glorious'; Greek: ἐνδοξότατος, endoxotatos) was the highest rank available to the senatorial aristocracy of the East Roman or Byzantine Empire in the 6th century. The title was introduced following the increasing proliferation, and hence debasement, of the earlier senatorial titles, such as vir illustris.

The title was restricted to the highest functionaries of the state, namely the magistri militum, the praetorian prefects, the quaestor sacri palatii and the magister officiorum, as well as an honorific to some important barbarian rulers, like Theodoric the Great, who were nominally Imperial subjects. The comites, although important officials in their own right, were conferred the title of magnificentissimus (lit. 'most magnificent'; Greek: μεγαλοπρεπέστατος, megaloprepestatos).

== Sources ==
- Kazhdan, Alexander, ed. (1991). Oxford Dictionary of Byzantium. Oxford University Press. ISBN 978-0-19-504652-6.
