= Roman commerce =

Major sector of the Roman economy

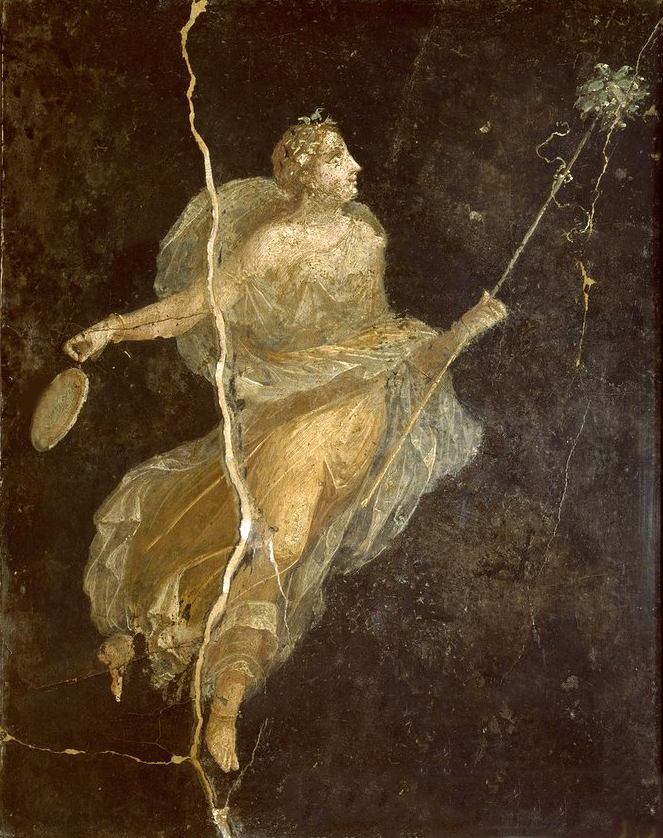
A Roman fresco from Pompeii, 1st century AD, depicting a Maenad in silk dress, Naples National Archaeological Museum; silks came from the Han dynasty of China along the Silk Road, a valuable trade commodity in the Roman empire, whereas Roman glasswares made their way to Han China via land and sea.

Roman commerce was a major sector of the Roman economy during the later generations of the Republic and throughout most of the imperial period. Fashions and trends in historiography and in popular culture have tended to neglect the economic basis of the empire in favor of the lingua franca of Latin and the exploits of the Roman legions. The language and the legions were supported by trade and were part of its backbone. Commercial trade contributed to the prosperity and integration of the Roman Empire.

Whereas in theory members of the Roman Senate and their sons were restricted when engaging in trade, the members of the equestrian order were involved in businesses despite their upper-class values, which laid the emphasis on military pursuits and leisure activities. Plebeians and freedmen held shop or manned stalls at markets, and vast numbers of slaves did most of the hard work. The slaves were themselves also the subject of commercial transactions. Probably because of their high proportion in society compared to that in Classical Greece, the reality of runaways, and the Servile Wars and minor uprisings, they gave a distinct flavor to Roman commerce.

The intricate, complex, and extensive accounting of Roman trade was conducted with counting boards and the Roman abacus. The abacus, which used Roman numerals, was ideally suited to the counting of Roman currency and tallying of Roman measures.

== Negotiatores, mercatores and pedlars ==
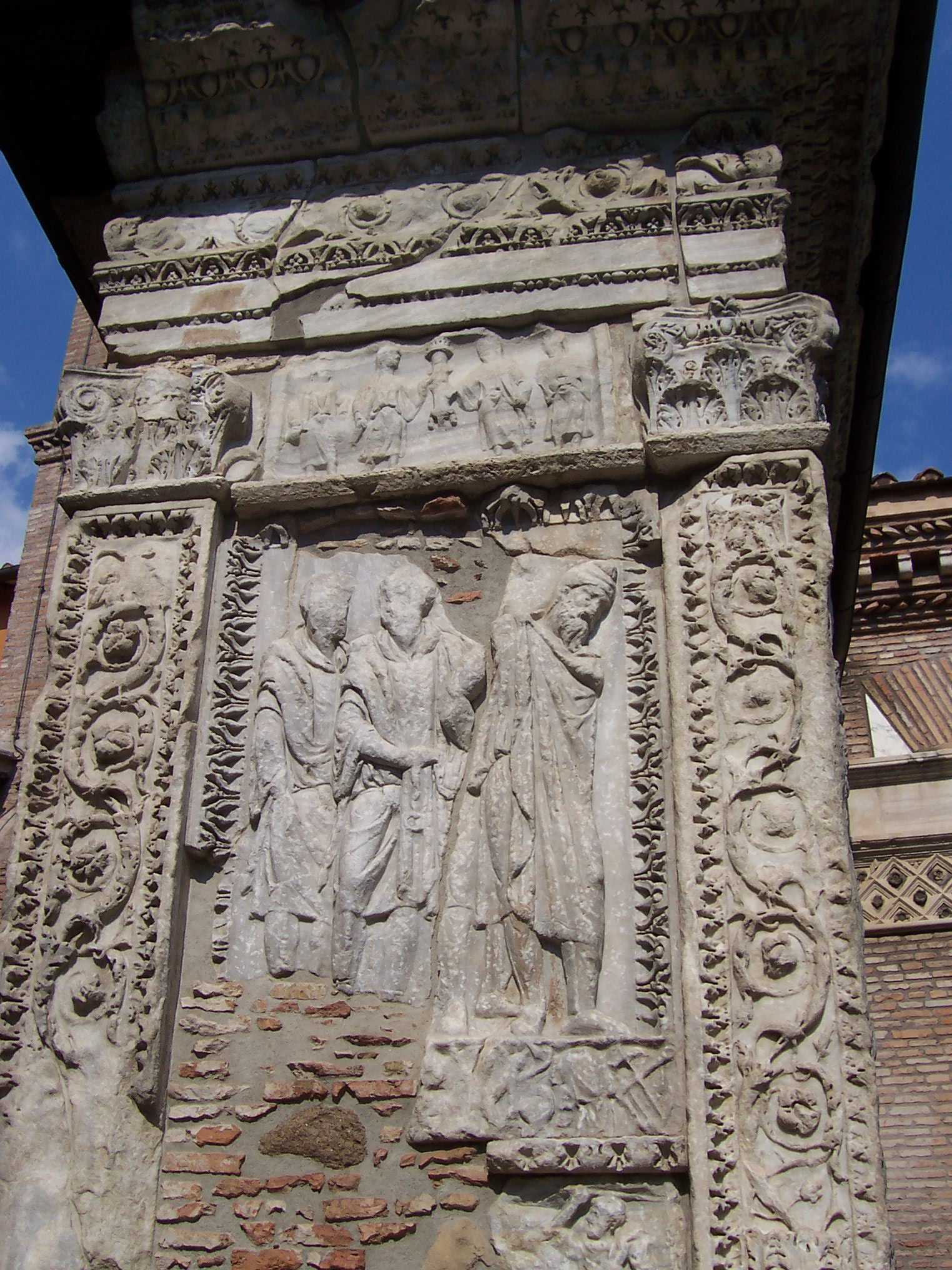
Arcus Argentariorum in Rome, a private offering of the argentarii and negotiantes of the Forum Boarium

The negotiatores were in part bankers because they lent money on interest. They also bought and sold staples in bulk or did commerce in wholesale quantities of goods. The argentarii acted as agents in public or private auctions, kept deposits of money for individuals, cashed cheques (prescriptiones) and served as moneychangers. In some instances the argentarii are considered a subset of the negotiatores and in others as a group apart. The argentarii sometimes did the same kind of work as the mensarii, who were public bankers appointed by the state. They kept strict books, called tabulae, which were treated as legal proof by the courts.

The Mercatores were usually Plebeians or freedmen. They were present in all the open-air markets or covered shops, manning stalls or hawking goods by the side of the road. They were also present near Roman military camps during campaigns. They sold food and clothing to the soldiers and paid cash for any booty coming from military activities.

There is some information on the economy of Roman Palestine from Jewish sources of around the 3rd century AD. Itinerant pedlars (rochel) took spices and perfumes to the rural population. This suggests that the economic benefits of the Empire did reach, at least, the upper levels of the peasantry.

== Commercial infrastructure ==
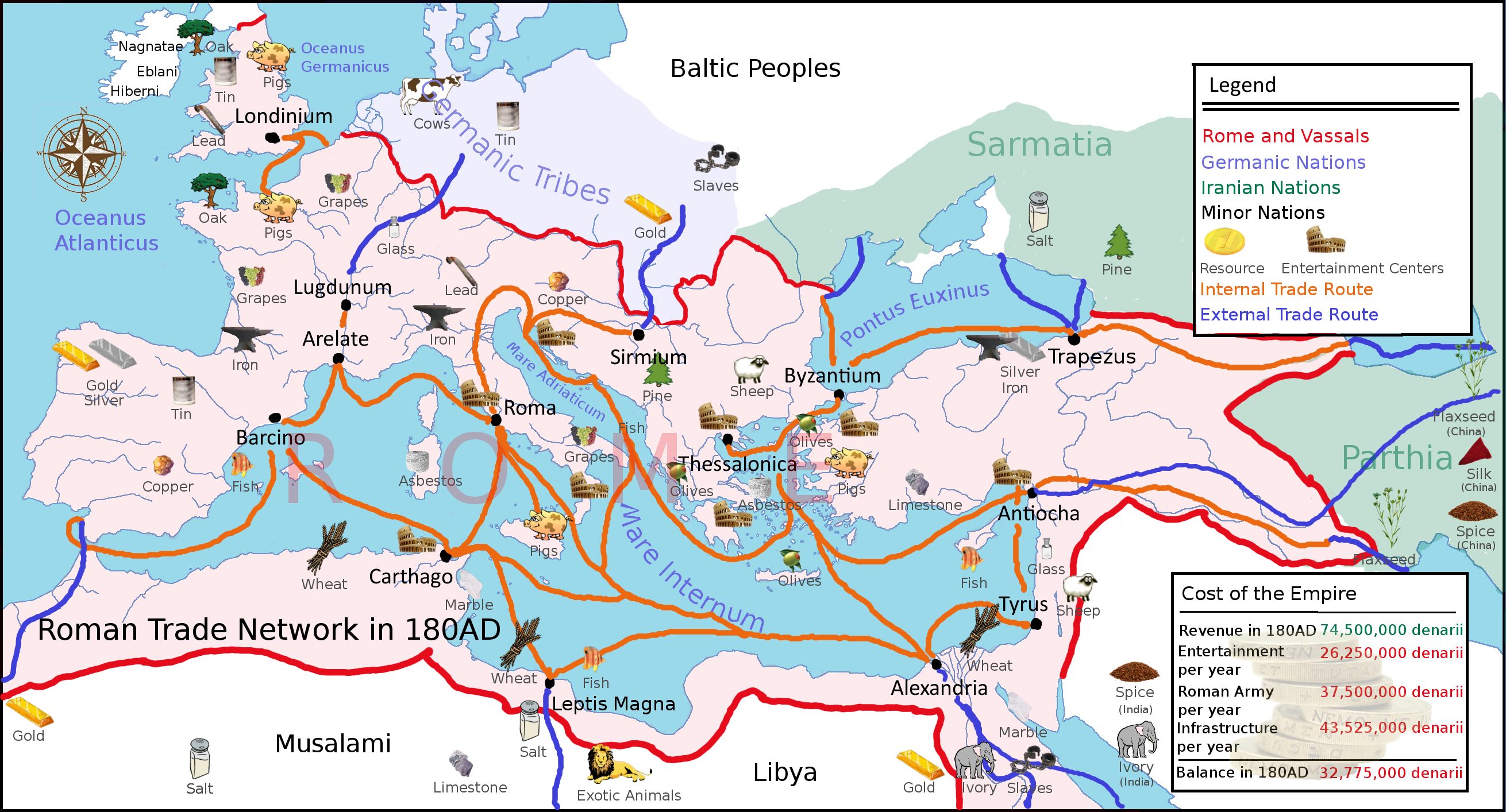
Principal Roman trade routes, internal and external in 180 AD

The Forum Cuppedinis in ancient Rome was a market which offered general goods. At least four other large markets specialized in specific goods such as cattle, wine, fish and herbs and vegetables, but the Roman Forum drew the bulk of the traffic. All new cities, like Timgad, were laid out according to an orthogonal grid plan which facilitated transportation and commerce. These cities were connected by good roads. Navigable rivers were extensively used and some canals were dug, but neither leave such clear archaeological traces as roads. Consequently, they tend to be underestimated. Maintaining peace was a major factor in the expansion of trade. All settlements—especially the smaller ones—could be located in economically rational positions. Before and after the Roman Empire, hilltop defensive positions were preferred for small settlements and piracy made coastal settlement particularly hazardous for all but the largest cities.

Recent archaeological and quantitative research has used coin-hoard evidence to examine the relationship between commercial infrastructure and monetary circulation in the Roman world. An analysis of georeferenced Republican coin hoards (155 BCE–2 CE) applied spatial interaction modelling to study how settlement hierarchies, transport routes, and urban infrastructure shaped patterns of circulation. The study found that coin finds were concentrated around major urban and transport nodes, including Rome, principal roads, and coastal port systems, suggesting that commercial infrastructure helped structure the spatial integration of the Roman economy.

By the 1st century, the provinces of the Roman Empire were trading huge volumes of commodities to one another via sea routes. There was an increasing tendency for specialization, particularly in manufacturing, agriculture and mining. Some provinces specialized in producing certain types of goods, such as grain in Egypt and North Africa and wine and olive oil in Italy, Hispania, and Greece.

Knowledge of the Roman economy is extremely patchy. The vast bulk of traded goods, being agricultural, normally leave no direct remains. Very exceptionally, as at Berenice, there is evidence of long-distance trade in black pepper, almonds, hazelnuts, stone pine cones, walnuts, coconuts, apricots and peaches besides the more expected figs, raisins and dates. The wine, olive oil and garum (fermented fish sauce) trades were exceptional in leaving amphorae behind. There is a single reference of the Syrian export of kipi stiff quince jam or marmalade to Rome.

=== Land routes ===
Even before the Roman Republic, the Roman Kingdom was engaged in regular commerce using the river Tiber. Before the Punic Wars completely changed the nature of commerce in the Mediterranean, the Republic had important commercial exchanges with Carthage. It entered into several commercial and political agreements with its rival city in addition to engaging in simple retail trading. The Roman Empire traded with the Chinese (via Parthian and other intermediaries) over the Silk Road.

=== Sea routes ===
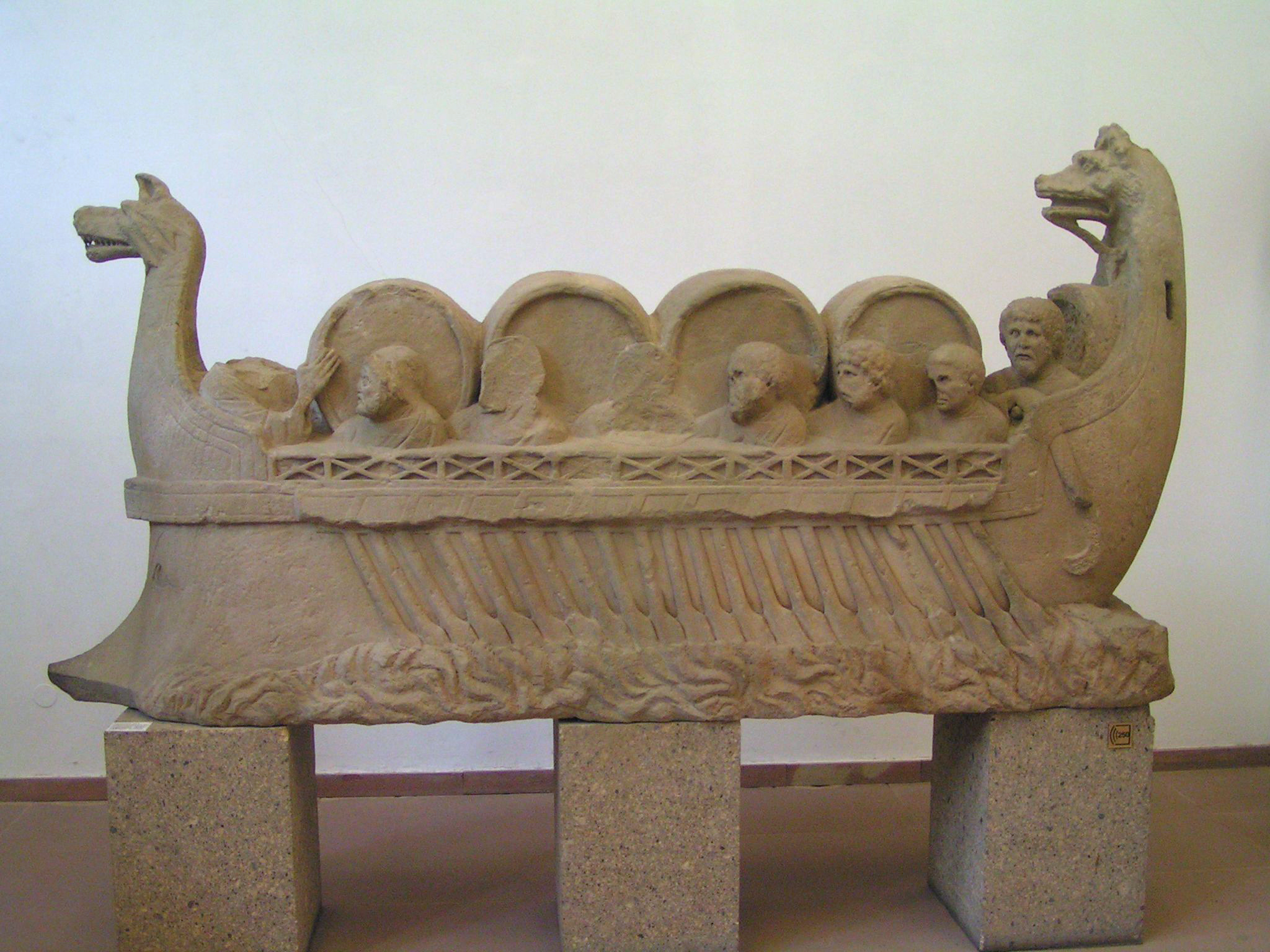
The Römischer Weinschiff, an ancient Roman river vessel carrying barrels, assumed to be wine, discovered in Neumagen-Dhron, Germany, now in the Rhenish State Museum in Trier

Maritime archeology and ancient manuscripts from classical antiquity show evidence of vast Roman commercial fleets. The most substantial remains from this commerce are the infrastructure remains of harbors, moles, warehouses and lighthouses at ports such as Civitavecchia, Ostia, Portus, Leptis Magna and Caesarea Maritima. At Rome itself, Monte Testaccio is a tribute to the scale of this commerce. As with most Roman technology, the Roman seagoing commercial ships had no significant advances over Greek ships of the previous centuries, though the lead sheeting of hulls for protection seems to have been more common. The Romans used round hulled sailing ships. Continuous Mediterranean "police" protection over several centuries was one of the main factors of success of Roman commerce, given that Roman roads were designed more for feet or hooves – with most land trade moving by pack mule – than for wheels, and could not support the economical transport of goods over long distances. The Roman ships used would have been easy prey for pirates had it not been for the fleets of liburna galleys and triremes of the Roman navy.

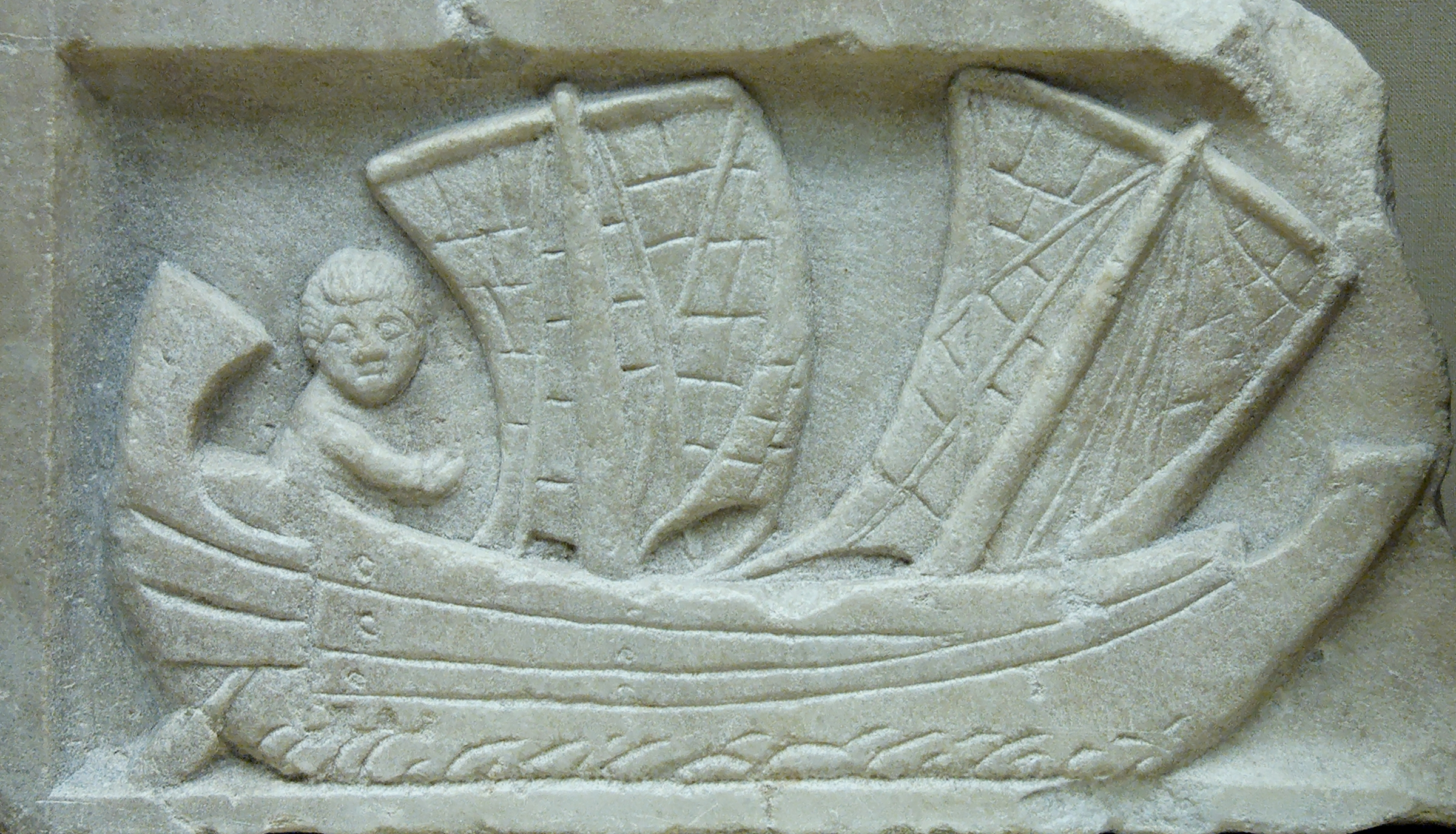
A small coaster

Bulky, low-value commodities, like grain and construction materials, were traded only by sea routes, since the cost of sea transportation was sixty times lower than land. Staple goods and commodities like cereals for making bread and papyrus scrolls for book production were imported from Ptolemaic Egypt to Italy in a continuous fashion.

The trade over the Indian Ocean blossomed in the 1st and 2nd century AD. The sailors made use of the monsoon to cross the ocean from the ports of Berenice, Leukos Limen and Myos Hormos on the Red Sea coast of Roman Egypt to the ports of Muziris and Nelkynda in the Malabar Coast. The main trading partners in southern India were the Tamil dynasties of the Pandyas, Cholas and Cheras. Many Roman artifacts have been found in India; for example, at the archaeological site of Arikamedu, in Puducherry. Meticulous descriptions of the ports and items of trade around the Indian Ocean can be found in the Greek work Periplus of the Erythraean Sea (see article on Indo-Roman trade).

=== Standard weights and measures ===
A standard amphora, the amphora capitolina, was kept in the temple of Jupiter on the Capitoline Hill in Rome, so that others could be compared to it. The Roman system of measurement was built on the Greek system with Egyptian influences. Much of it was based on weight. The Roman units were accurate and well documented. Distances were measured, and systematically inscribed on stone by agents of the government.

A fairly standard and fairly stable and abundant currency, at least up to circa 200 AD, did much to facilitate trade. (Egypt had its own currency in this period and some provincial cities also issued their own coins.)

== Contacts with India and China ==
Alexander the Great had conquered as far as India, and the Roman god Bacchus was also said to have journeyed there. The Far East, like sub-Saharan Africa, was a mysterious land to the Romans.

=== India ===
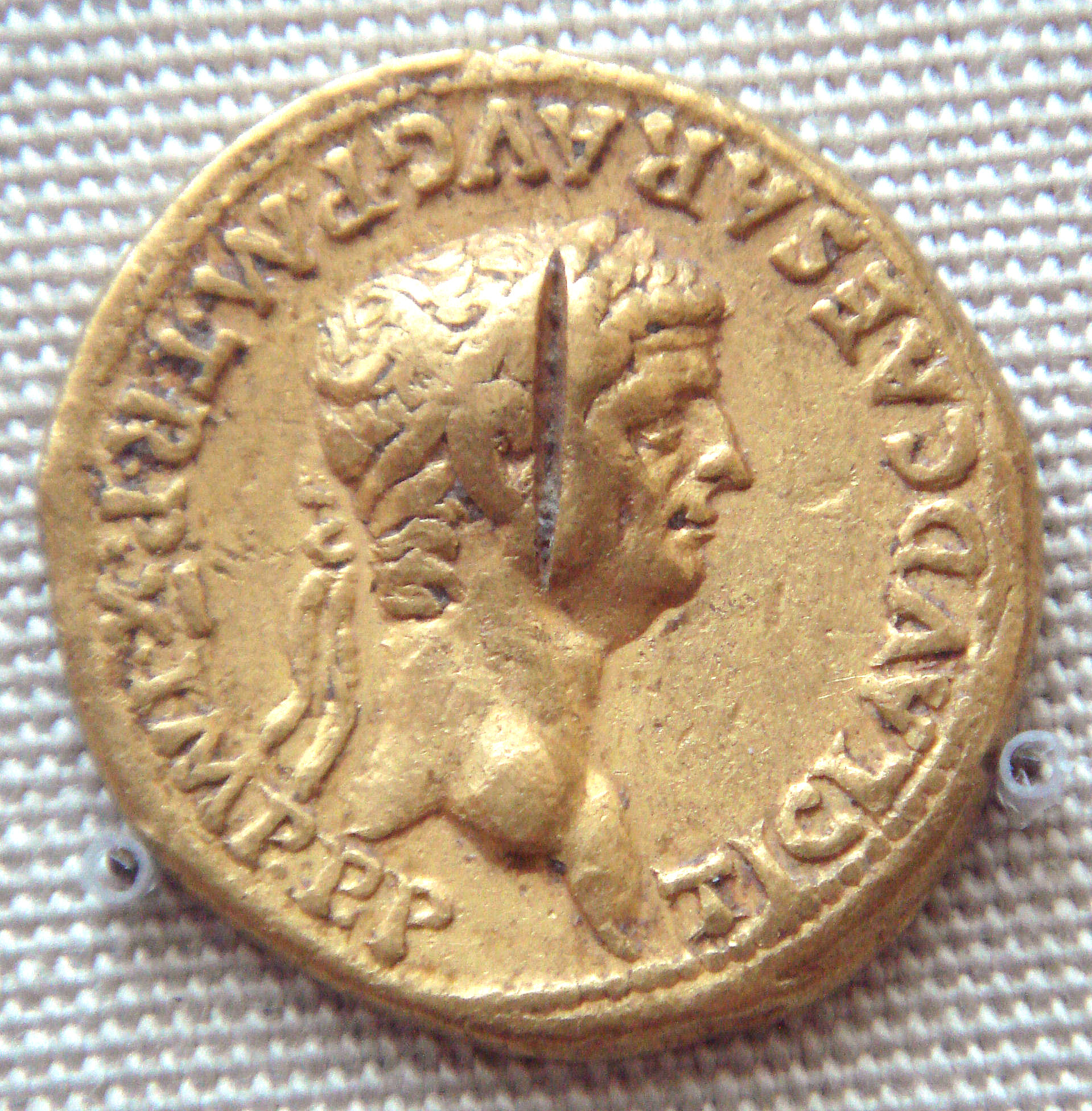
Gold coin of Claudius (50-51 CE) excavated in South India

There was an Indian in Augustus's retinue (Plut. Alex. 69.9), and he received embassies from India (Res Gestae, 31); one which met him in Spain in 25 BC, and one at Samos in 20 BC.

The trade over the Indian Ocean blossomed in the 1st and 2nd century AD. The sailors made use of the monsoon to cross the ocean from the ports of Berenice, Leulos Limen and Myos Hormos on the Red Sea coast of Roman Egypt to the ports of Muziris and Nelkynda on the Malabar coast. The main trading partners in southern India were the Tamil dynasties of the Pandyas, Cholas and Cheras. Meticulous descriptions of the ports and items of trade around the Indian Ocean can be found in the Greek Periplus of the Erythraean Sea. In Latin texts, the term Indians (Indi) designated all Asians, Indian and beyond.

The main articles imported from India were spices such as pepper, cardamom, cloves, cinnamon, sandal wood and gems such as pearls, rubies, diamonds, emeralds and ivory. In exchange the Romans traded silver and gold. Hoards of Roman coins have been found in southern India during the history of Roman-India trade. Roman objects have been found in India in the seaside port city of Arikamedu, which was one of the trade centers.

Pomponius Mela argued for the existence of Northeast Passage through the northward strait out of the Caspian Sea (which in Antiquity was usually thought to be open to Oceanus in the north).

=== China ===
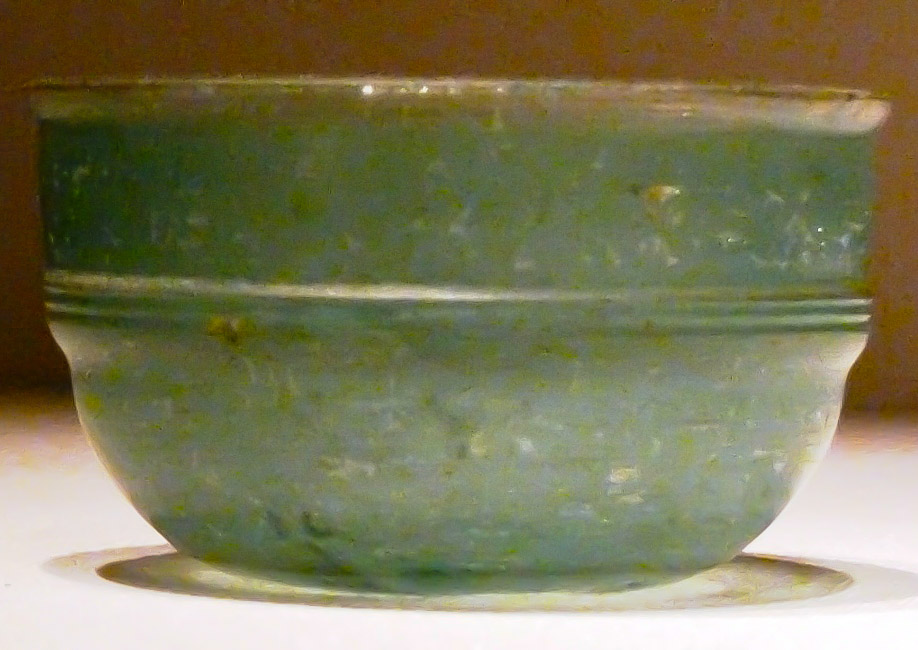
Green Roman glass cup unearthed from an Eastern Han Dynasty (25-220 AD) tomb, Guangxi, China; the first Roman glassware discovered in China, dated early 1st century BC, was excavated from a Western Han tomb in the southern port city of Guangzhou, most likely arriving via the Indian Ocean and South China Sea.

There is suggestive archaeological evidence that Roman traders were present in Southeast Asia, which was roughly mapped out by Ptolemy in his Geography where he labelled the land bordering the Magnus Sinus (i.e., the Gulf of Thailand and South China Sea) as the Sinae. Their port city of "Cattigara", lying beyond the Golden Chersonese (Malay Peninsula) where a Greek sailor named Alexander allegedly visited, was quite possibly the ancient settlement at Oc Eo, Vietnam, where Roman artefacts from the Antonine period such as medallions from the reigns of Antoninus Pius (r. 138–161) and Marcus Aurelius (r. 161–180) have been found. An event recorded in the Chinese Weilue and Book of Later Han for the year 166 seems directly connected to this activity, since these texts claim that an embassy from "Daqin" (i.e., the Roman Empire) sent by their ruler "An Dun" (Chinese: 安敦; i.e., either Antoninus Pius or Marcus Aurelius) landed in the southern province of Jiaozhi (i.e., northern Vietnam) and presented tributary gifts to the Chinese ruler Emperor Huan of Han. Rafe de Crespigny and Warwick Ball contend that these were most likely Roman merchants, not official diplomats sent by Marcus Aurelius (given the absence of this event in Roman sources).

Despite two other Roman embassies recorded in Chinese sources for the 3rd century and several more by the later Byzantine Empire (Chinese: 拂菻; Pinyin: Fú lǐn), only sixteen Roman coins from the reigns of Tiberius (r. 14–37 AD) to Aurelian (r. 270–275 AD) have been found in China at Xi'an that pre-date the greater amount of Eastern Roman (i.e., Byzantine) coins from the 4th century onwards. Yet this is also dwarfed by the amount of Roman coins found in India, which would suggest that this was the region where the Romans purchased most of their Chinese silk. For that matter, the spice trade remained more important to the Roman economy than the silk one.

From the 3rd century a Chinese text, the Weilüe, describes the products of the Roman Empire and the routes to it.

== Commerce and religion ==
Mercury, who was originally only the god of the mercatores and the grain trade eventually became the god of all who were involved in commercial activities. On the Mercuralia on May 14, a Roman merchant would do the proper rituals of devotion to Mercury and beseech the god to remove from him and from his belongings the guilt coming from all the cheating he had done to his customers and suppliers.

== The elite and a dual mentality on trade ==
While Livy makes reference to the Lex Claudia (218 BC) restricting senators and sons of senators from owning a ship with greater than 300 amphorae capacity (about seven tons), they were still undoubtedly partaking in trade as Cicero mentions this law when attacking Verres, although he makes no move to charge him.

Senators were still allowed to own and make use of ships under the size restriction, Cato when advising where to build a farm specifically mentions to have it built near an accessible river, road or port to allow transport of goods which is in direct conflict to Livy's assertion that all profit made through trade by a senator was dishonorable. Senators often utilized free and enslaved agents as a loophole to legal restrictions, thereby allowing themselves to diversify their sources of income.

That is not to say that the acquisition of wealth was not to be desired, Pliny notes that a Roman man should by honorable means acquire a large fortune and Polybius draws a comparison between the attitudes of Carthage and Rome towards profit from trade. Thus starts the confusion in the role of the elite in trade as Terence writes that there is nothing wrong with large scale trade; it is in fact completely honorable and legitimate to import large quantities of product from around the world especially if it happens to lead to a successful trader buying land and investing in Roman agriculture; what is dishonorable is trade on a small scale. Small trade is again shown as vulgar by Tacitus as he describes the involvement of Sempronius Gracchus in petty trade.

Cato himself was involved with trade, although he himself cautioned against it as it was a risky occupation, perhaps this was part of the reasoning to keep senators excluded from the trade business, as if they had a severe misfortune with trading they could fall below the financial threshold of being a senator, whereas comparatively land owning was a far safer investment. Plutarch describes Cato's involvement in trade in great detail, depicting how he would use a proxy (a freedman by the name of Quintio) to run his business through a group of fifty other men.

The restriction on senators trading was itself passed initially through the tribune of the plebeians, a class of people who the restrictions would not apply to. It is suspected that this reform could have been the equites and other wealthy merchants trying to muscle the senators out from the rapidly expanding trade business.

== Commercial classes ==
The majority of the people of the Roman Empire were living in rural areas, with a small part of the population engaged in commerce being much poorer than the elite. The industrial output was quite low, due to the fact that the poor majority could not pay for the products. Technological advance was hampered by this fact. Urbanization in the western part of the empire was also limited. Slaves accounting for most of the means of industrial output, rather than technology.

== See also ==
- Roman Britain: Trade
- Roman currency
- Roman finance
- Slavery in Ancient Rome
