= Congiarium =

Vessel in Ancient Rome

Of Ancient Roman containers, a congiarium, or congiary (Latin, from congius), was a vessel containing one congius, a measure of volume equal to six sextarii.

In the early times of the Roman Republic, the congius was the usual measure of oil or wine which was, on certain occasions, distributed among the people; and thus congiarium became a name for liberal donations to the people, in general, whether consisting of oil, wine, grain, or money, or other things, while donations made to the soldiers were called donativa, though they were sometimes also termed congiaria.

Congiarium was, moreover, occasionally used simply to designate a present or a pension given by a person of high rank, or a prince, to his friends; and Fabius Maximus called the presents which Augustus made to his friends, on account of their smallness, heminaria, instead of congiaria, because hemina was only the twelfth part of a congius.

Tiberius gave a congiarium of 72½ denarii (300 sesterces) to each citizen. Caligula gave the same amount of three hundred sesterces on two occasions. Nero, whose congiaria were the earliest known examples represented on coins, gave four hundred.

Despite Trajan's financial success, his practice of giving extravagant congiaria to the people of Rome received severe condemnation. His first congiarium, in 99, was probably no larger than that of Nerva (75 denarii per person), but his second and third distributions of money, after each Dacian War, amounted to 650 denarii per person.

Hadrian treated the Roman people in the same way as Trajan, and of him Fronto said:

I consider it good policy that the prince did not neglect the theatre or the circus and arena, as he well knew that there are two things which the Roman applaud especially—the distribution of grain, and games. The neglect of the important thing [grains] causes great harm, of the frivolous thing [entertainment] greater hatred—the crowd hungering more for games than for bread, because by the gift to the people [congiarium] only those who are authorized to receive the grain will be gratified, while by the games the whole population is pacified.

— Fronto, Princ. Hist., p. 249, ed. Barthold Georg Niebuhr.

== See also ==
- Aerarium
- Comes
- Fiscus
- Rationalis
- Rationibus
- Roman finance
