= Rationalis =

Roman Empire finance minister role

A rationalis was a high-ranking fiscal officer in the Roman Empire. Until replaced by the comes sacrarum largitionum by Emperor Constantine in the early 4th century, the rationalis summarum – comparable to a modern-day finance minister – was one of two state officials who had authority over the imperial treasury, the other one being the rationalis rei privatae (manager of imperial estates and city properties). Examples for tasks that were performed by a rationalis are "the collection of all normal taxes and duties, the control of currency and the administration of mines and mints".

Each province also had various classes of rationales, and Emperor Diocletian's administrative reforms had mirrored the dual structure on the diocesis–level, instituting the local positions rationalis summarum and magister rei privatae above the procuratores. The former continued to exist after the reforms, one example are the comes et rationalis summarum Aegypti. (Note: Eusebius mentions a martyr of early christianity by the name of Philoromus in his Historia Ecclesiastica who is supposed to have held the title rationalis ad diocesim Alexandriae, but Christensen suggests Eusebius' information may be unreliable and exaggerated.) In the 6th century, the post was increasingly rendered into its Greek equivalent, logothete, which later was given to the senior fiscal secretaries of the middle Byzantine Empire (7th–12th centuries).

== See also ==
- Aerarium
- Congiarium
- fiscus
- rationibus
- Roman finance
