= Comes rerum privatarum =

Official of the Roman empire

In the Roman Empire during late antiquity, the comes rerum privatarum (Greek: κόμης τῆς ἰδικῆς παρουσίας, kómēs tēs idikēs parousías), literally "count of the private fortune", was the official charged with administering the estates of the emperor. He did not administer public lands, although the distinction between the emperor's private property and state property was not always clear or consistently applied. The comes collected rents, handled sales of movable and immovable property, protected the estates from usurpation and accepted lands that came to the emperor by way of grant, bequest, confiscation or forfeiture. Vacant lands (bona vacantia) and heirless property (bona caduca) both escheated to the emperor.

The office was probably created around 318, at the same time as that of the comes sacrarum largitionum, although it is not explicitly mentioned until the period 342–45. The comes was one of the comites consistoriales. He held by virtue of his office the rank of vir illustris and was automatically a member of the senate of Rome or the senate of Constantinople. The title comes (literally "companion") indicates that he was a member of the emperor's entourage (comitatus). The two offices (rerum privatarum and sacrarum largitionum) were the highest in the imperial bureaucracy in the fourth through sixth centuries. The department of the rerum privatarum was slightly smaller. It had five sub-departments (scrinia) at court and also officers at the diocesan and provincial levels. In the capital, the scrinia were staffed by the palatini rerum privatarum—the term palatini being common for officials serving at court (palatium). These were sent out annually to oversee the work of the diocesan and provincial officials. According to the Codex Theodosianus, in 399 there were three hundred such officials under the comes rerum privatarum. The comes sometimes grouped estates together to form a domus divinae (literally "divine household") and placed an official separate from the diocesan or provincial one in charge of it.

By 414, the domus divinae of Cappadocia had been transferred from the competence of the comes rerum privatarum to that of the praepositus sacri cubiculi. In the western Empire, Emperor Glycerius (473–74) created a new official, the comes patrimonii, to administer the directly-held imperial estates, leaving the comes rerum privatarum only the rented-out properties and the judicial functions connected with forfeitures and grants. Before 509, probably in the 490s, Anastasius I copied Glycerius's reform in the eastern Empire. Gradually, the office lost its fiscal remit and acquired even broader judicial competence, finally dealing even with cases involving of grave robbery and marriage. Before the seventh century was over, the office had disappeared altogether, partially replaced by the sakellarios. During the reign of Justinian I (527–65), most of the domus divinae had been placed in the hands of curators independent of the comes rerum privatarum.

== See also ==
- Roman finance

== Sources ==
- Barnish, Sam; Lee, A. D.; Whitby, Michael (2000). "Government and Administration". In Cameron, Averil; Ward-Perkins, Bryan; Whitby, Michael (eds.). The Cambridge Ancient History, Volume XIV: Late Antiquity: Empire and Successors, A.D. 425–600. Cambridge: Cambridge University Press. pp. 164–206. ISBN 978-0-5213-2591-2.
- Kazhdan, Alexander (1991). "Comes Rerum Privatarum". In Kazhdan, Alexander (ed.). The Oxford Dictionary of Byzantium. Oxford and New York: Oxford University Press. pp. 485–486. ISBN 0-19-504652-8.
