= Consilium principis =

Council created by the first Roman Emperor

The consilium principis (advisers to the princeps) was a council created by the first Roman Emperor, Augustus, in the latter years of his reign to control legislation in the deliberative institution of the Senate. The princeps (from Latin, meaning "first man") was another title for the emperor.

== Overview ==
The consilium principis had a foundation in imperial Roman government until the time of Emperor Diocletian (284–305 AD). Augustus throughout his reign took the legislative control from the Senate and placed it under his auspices. However it was the creation of this new body that stood to make the Senate a second tier legislative body, as fundamentally the consilium principis controlled the bills put forward to the Senate. Therefore, the Senate, the most important administration of the Roman Republic, remained in name only. Scullard states, "But though in practice the senate increasingly developed into an active legislative assembly, the initiative and advice behind its activity may often have come from the emperor." Whilst the Senate grew in prestige with 3 censuses to reduce its membership in 28BC, 18BC and 11BC and similarly with the imposition of its membership with the requirement that senators be worth 1 million sesterces, Augustus increasingly had the foremost role in the Roman state. The consilium principis comprised Augustus, the consuls and 15 senators with lower ranking members rotating out of the body every six months, however, owing to Augustus' auctoritas and him being princeps the body fell under his auspices. Scullard reinforces this notion saying "In one important way he made the Senate more efficient and at the same time, more amenable to his own wishes: he established a senatorial standing committee."

It was in Augustus' 76th year (AD 13) that he became unable to, through his old age, properly manage the Senate and as a result required counselors, consisting of supporters and family members, to partake in controlling the legislation of the Senate. The passage in Dio Cassius illuminates the councils position in the government of Rome:

Dio 56.28.2 (AD 13) 'He also asked for twenty counselors on account of his age, which did not permit him to go to the senate-house any longer except on rare occasions; previously it seems he had associated himself with fifteen advisors for six months at a time. It was also voted that any measure should be valid, as being satisfactory to the whole senate, which should be resolved upon by him in deliberation with Tiberius and with these counsellors, as well as the consuls of the year and the consuls designate, together with his grandchildren (the adopted ones, I mean) and such others as might at any time call on for advice.'

The Consilium Principis grew in power over the course of imperial Rome and, by the third century AD, became the foremost element of imperial administration. The body, by the reign of Constantine the Great, became the sacrum consistorium and was recognized as an independent department of the imperial government.
