= Treasury =

Place or organization holding wealth

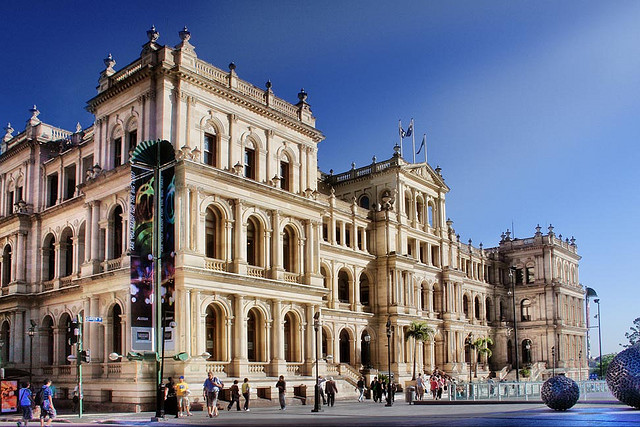
The Treasury Building in Brisbane

A treasury is either:

- a government department related to finance and taxation, a finance ministry; in a business context, corporate treasury
- a place or location where treasure, such as currency or precious items are kept. These can be state or royal property, church treasure or in private ownership.

The head of a treasury is typically known as a treasurer. This position may not necessarily have the final control over the actions of the treasury, particularly if they are not an elected representative.

The adjective for a treasury is normally "treasurial". The adjective "tresorial" can also be used, but this normally means pertaining to a treasurer.

== History ==
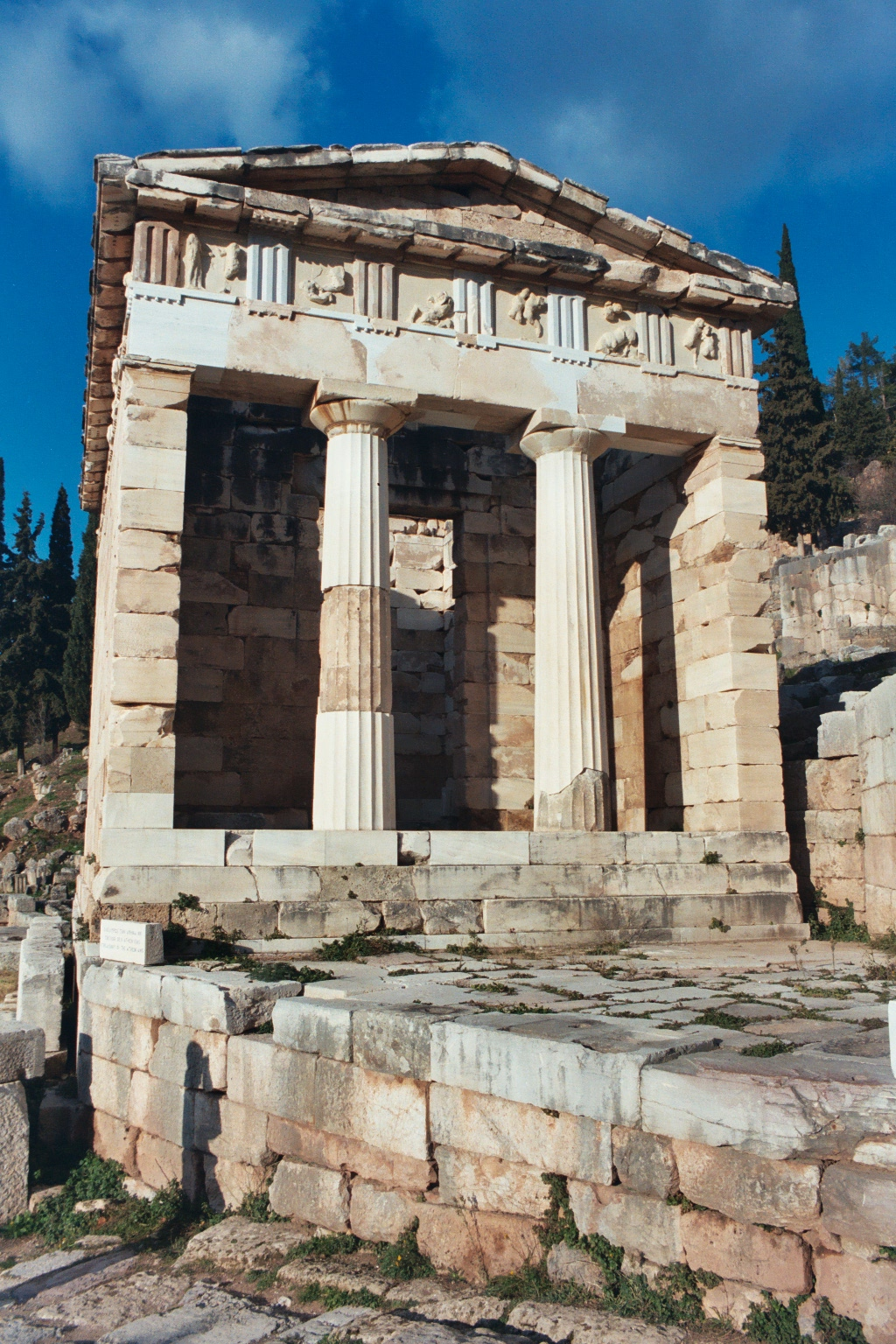
The Athenian Treasury at Delphi, built with the spoils of the Battle of Marathon

The earliest found artefacts made of silver and gold are from Lake Varna in Bulgaria dated 4250–4000 BC, the earliest of copper are dated 9000–7000 BC.

...And there was also silver weighing many thousands of talents and all the royal treasure amounting to a very great sum...

— Procopius of Caesarea

The Greek term thêsauros (treasury) was first used in Classical times to describe the votive buildings erected to house gifts to the gods, such as the Siphnian Treasury in Delphi or many similar buildings erected in Olympia, Greece by competing city-states to impress others during the ancient Olympic Games. In Ancient Greece treasuries were almost always physically incorporated within religious buildings such as temples, thus making state funds sacrosanct and adding moral constraints to the penal ones to those who would have access to these funds.

The sovereigns' treasury within the palace in ancient Jerusalem is considered to be similar in nature to the temple treasury. The temple treasury of the settlement had appointed officials and functioned akin to a bank.

... in fact, practically in every city there are banking places for the holy money ...

— Philo

In excavations of Persepolis, a text containing information pertaining to the activities of a temple treasury were discovered dated to the fifth century BC. The texts written in the Elamite language name the treasurer as ganzabara

The ancient Roman word aerarium signified the treasury of the Senate; fiscus indicated the imperial treasury used by the emperor.

== Treasuries as government departments ==
=== Treasury ===
In the United Kingdom, His Majesty's Treasury is overseen by the Chancellor of the Exchequer. The traditional honorary title of First Lord of the Treasury is held by the prime minister. His Majesty's Revenue and Customs administers the taxation system.

In the United States, the Treasurer reports to an executive-appointed Secretary of the Treasury. The IRS is the revenue agency of the US Department of the Treasury.

=== Ministry of finance ===
In many other countries, the treasury is called the "ministry of finance" and the head is known as the finance minister. Examples include Bangladesh, Belgium, Canada, Ghana, India, Italy, Japan, Malaysia, the Netherlands, New Zealand, Pakistan, Singapore, Spain, Zimbabwe.

=== Both ===
In some other countries, a "Treasury" will exist alongside a separate "Ministry of Finance", with divided functions.

The State Treasury (Polish: Skarb Państwa) represents the Polish state acting in the field of civil law relations in which it is treated as equal partner to private entities (as opposed to the sphere of public law relations in which the State, represented by public authorities, decides unilaterally on the legal situation of individuals). It can be represented by various officials or institutions depending on circumstances and has its own ministry, the Ministry of State Treasury. Historically, it was created in the Crown of the Kingdom of Poland in 1590, when the public treasury (or the Crown Treasury) was split from the Royal Treasury.

The government of Ukraine also includes the Ministry of Finance as well as the Ministry of State Treasury. It was the same in Italy before the creation of the united Ministry of Economy.

In the Australian federal government a treasurer and a finance minister co-exist. The Department of the Treasury is responsible for drafting the government budget, economic policy (except monetary policy), some market regulation and revenue policy (which is administered by the Australian Taxation Office). The Finance Minister, who manages the Department of Finance, is responsible for budget management, government expenditure and market deregulation.

== Treasuries as locations ==
A treasury is also a room or building in which precious or valuable objects are preserved, especially objets d’art in precious metals and jewels, of a ruler or other collector which are kept in a secure room and often found in the basement of a palace or castle.

=== State treasuries ===
In past times revenue collected by the monarch would be kept in a secure stronghold; the kings of England traditionally used the Tower of London, which also housed the Royal Mint. Latterly gold reserves are held in a country's central bank; the gold reserves of the United Kingdom are housed in a vault at the Bank of England.

The country with the largest gold reserve is the United States; the US claims to have 8133.5 tons of gold, held at Fort Knox (58%), West Point (20%), the US Mint in Denver (16%) and the residue (approximately 5%) at the Federal Reserve Bank of New York.

The second largest reserve, that of Germany, is held at the Deutsche Bundesbank in Frankfurt am Main, the Federal Reserve Bank in New York and the Bank of England in London.

The third, held by the IMF, is in a number of in designated deposits.

These treasuries are believed to satisfy a number of essential criteria, which include cost efficiency, security, and the ability to liquidate reserves at short notice.

=== Church treasuries ===
The Christian Church has a variety of treasures that have spiritual or religious value rather than financial worth; these are housed in treasuries at most cathedrals. These take the form of relics, icons, manuscripts, votive offerings and liturgical garments. Of particular note are the St Chad Gospels at Lichfield Cathedral, and the Codex Eyckensis at St Catherine's Church, Maaseik. The treasury at Aachen Cathedral has a number of valuable artifacts, such as the Cross of Lothair and the Treasury Gospels.

=== Private treasuries ===
Collections of personal treasures, where the objects assembled are there because of the interest of the collector, rather than any intrinsic value, have been seen since the times of the Ancient Greeks, and more particularly, the Romans. For example, various Roman emperors devoted considerable effort to bring Egyptian obelisks from the Middle East to Rome, or had copies made in Rome itself. In medieval times a number of monarchs had menageries of exotic beasts; Henry III (r.1216-1292) owned three leopards, a polar bear and an African elephant, while emperor Frederick II (r.1220-1250) owned giraffes, cheetahs, lynxes, leopards, exotic birds and an elephant, and had a variety of rare falcons. The private collection of curiosities in England has been ascribed to 16th century polymath Francis Bacon, and in Europe to the emperor Rudolph II. In Russia this was pioneered by tsar Peter the Great. Notable modern collections include the Waddesdon and the Wallace collections in Britain, and the Getty and Guggenheim collections in the US.

== See also ==
- Fiscus
- Treasury management
- US Department of the Treasury
- HM Treasury (United Kingdom)
