= Cohors amicorum =

Roman Latin term meaning "cohort of friends"

Cohors amicorum is a Latin term literally meaning "cohort of friends". The notion cohort is to be taken not in the strict, military sense (primarily the constitutive unit of a Roman legion; circa battalion), but indicated a fairly large number; accordingly, friend is to be taken in a loose sense, rather as in amicus curiae; compare the Hellenistic aulic title philos [basilikos].

== Roman history ==
- Originally, since the Roman Republic proper (i.e. before the Principate), the cohors amicorum was synonymous with the cohors praetoria, so called after the praetorium, the tent –in the field– or more permanent dwelling of a Roman commanding general, military headquarters but also site of his other actions, e. g. as a judge, possibly on an adjoining podium called tribunal. The military (including or annexing various logistic, domestic, financial and administrative) staff company functioned as suite and bodyguard of a high Roman official, such as a Roman governor, who brought a trusted staff of most kinds with him to his post, especially in command of one or more legions.
- In the Principate, high administrative offices tended to be separated from military command, transferred to imperial legates. But the various not strictly military functions still had to be acquitted, so there was a mainly civilian 'company' of clerks, advisors, retainers a. o., still referred to in such terms as cohors (amicorum), amici, possibly specified by the pivotal personality, e. g. amici principis around the Emperor. In fact, the administration was to be streamlined in a rather typical officium with ever more detailed rules on competences, career, etc.

The cohort remained at least as a social notion, if now very informal, and seems to have existed with other persons of high rank, such as imperial princes.

- Its members were termed cohortalis (plural cohortales); the diminutive cohortalinus became a generic term (like apparitor) for non-cadre clerks in a high dignitary's officium, mainly administrative staff.

== See also ==
- For an alternative, highly formalised evolution of and from the originally parallel notion comitatus (also 'company'), see comes.
- From this sense of cohors derives the Italian corte (a princely, etc.) court and hence corteggio, 'cortège', which again came to mean a train of attendants or retinue, a similarly elastic notion.
- The modern military also knows special units performing various services to a command and its headquarters, by such terms as staff company or staff battalion

== Sources and references ==
- Johann Oehler, Cohors amicorum, in: Pauly–Wissowa (German-language encyclopaedia on nearly everything relevant to Classical Antiquity)
- Etymonline.com, an online etymology dictionary.
