= Fiscus =

Imperial Roman treasury

Fiscus (from Latin 'basket') was the treasury of the Roman Empire. It was initially the personal wealth of the emperors, funded by taxation on the imperial provinces, assumption of estates and other privileges. By the third century it was understood as a state fund rather than a personal one, albeit under the emperor's control. It is the origin of the English terms "fiscal" and "confiscation".

== Origins ==
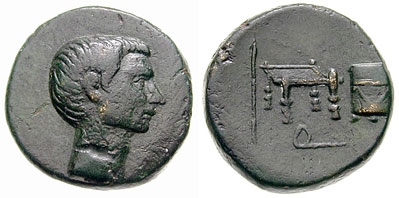
Coin (c. 38 BCE) showing a fiscus to the right of a hasta publica (auction pike) and sella quaestoria (auditor's bench)

Augustus divided Rome's territory between senatorial provinces, whose tributes ended up in the aerarium (the already existing state's chest), and imperial provinces, whose incomes ended up into the fiscus, the emperor's chest. Upon the latter chest fell the most burdensome costs, namely the ones for army and fleet, bureaucracy and grants to urban plebs (distribution of wheat or moneys).

The imperial provinces, under Augustus' reform, were the provinces non pacatae (i.e., the border provinces) which Augustus had advocated under his direct administration. Those provinces, that later started to be called provinciae Caesaris, were entrusted to equites and agents of the emperor with the title of procuratores Augusti.

Despite this separation, the emperor had the right to transfer moneys from the aerarium to the fiscus.

Several historians believe that there were only ten senatorial provinces, that is one third of the total number of the imperial ones. This fact would prove that the fiscus were much richer and relevant than the aerarium already from its birth.

== Administration ==
The head of the fiscus in the first years was the a rationibus, originally a freedman due to Augustus' desire to place the office in the hands of a servant free of the class demands of the traditional society. In succeeding years the corruption and reputation of the freedman forced new and more reliable administrators. From the time of Hadrian, any a rationibus hailed from the Equestrian Order (equites) and remained so through the 3rd century and into the age of Diocletian.

Under the Flavian dynasty, a new official, rather than the a rationibus, was in charge of the fiscus, called procurator fisci (or procurator a rationibus Augusti). He had some tasks like drawing up a state's financial statement and forecasting empire's incomes and outcomes. He also managed the assets of the emperor (patrimonium principii), the army's expenditures, the allocation of wheat, the restoration of aqueducts, temples and streets. At last he had the crucial role of establishing the annual quantity of metal to be minted.

== Fiscus' incomes ==
The incomes of the emperor's chest could derive from taxes or from other sources.

=== Incomes from taxes ===
- The first noteworthy tax is the provincial tax imposed to the imperial provinces. It is essentially a 10% of the entire amount of taxes due, imposed only on those able to generate profits (females, children and old people were not subjected). These incomes were especially used for national defense.
- There was also the vicesima hereditatium, a tax of 5% of the inheritances.
- Another important tax was the dogana, with a variable percentage going from 1.5% up to 5%.
- Luxury objects imported from the east, for instance spices, silk and precious stones were subject of a customs tax 25% of their value.
- The last one was on the turnover, but it isn't known in which measure.

=== Non-fiscal incomes ===
- Incomes received as inheritance by the emperor. This type was one of the most relevant income sources for the fiscus; it was a custom among the Romans to leave as inheritance something to the emperor.
- The lost portion of an inheritance (bona caduca), that is the part of the inheritance that couldn't be received by the heir. There were some reasons for which someone couldn't receive the whole inheritance or part of it. For example, the Lex Papia Poppaea Nuptialis (9 BC) established that some people couldn't inherit, namely: the caelibes (unmarried men between 25 and 60 years old and unmarried women between 20 and 50 years old) they lost the 100% of their capacity to inherit, the orbi (married people without sons) who lost the 50% of their capacity to inherit, the pater solitarius (i.e. who had sons from a previous marriage but didn't marry again) for them the lost capacity isn't known. There are also laws concerning the unworthiness of the heirs.
- The vacant inheritance (bona vacantia), that is the case in which the inheritance was without any heirs, neither legal nor designated. If the deceased was a citizen of one of the imperial provinces the fiscus became owner (but, in this case, it also inherited any eventual debts).
- The inheritance of the “implicit guarantor”. Is a very peculiar kind of guarantor who was relevant in case the deceased asked him (but with an unspecified formula) to transfer the inheritance once received. This disposition was meant to avoid the use of this figure, because it was usually used to avoid some other legislative dispositions.
- State's assets incomes: national mines’ incomes and leasing of public lands (tributum soli).
- Incomes from the sale of war's treasuries.
- Incomes from the discovery of treasuries, the half of the treasure found in the imperial provinces had to be delivered to the fiscus.
- Incomes from fines.
- The goods of the convicted (bona damnatorum), i.e. all the good of people sentenced to deprivation of life or freedom or citizenry right, had to be delivered to the fiscus.

== Nature of the fiscus ==
There are three different theories about the nature of the fiscus.

The first theory takes the fiscus as the private capital of the emperor.

The second theory states that the fiscus was a public capital entrusted to the emperor to maintain public order. It should have been used only for public welfare aims. Supporting this thesis there are the facts that some emperors, like Augustus, made its accounting public, that the emperor could leave as inheritance the fiscus only to his heir to the throne, and that Pertinax defined the fiscus as public.

According to the third theory the fiscus was owned neither by the emperor nor by the people, but it was essentially a legal person. The emperors could use it only for public interest reasons. As a legal person it could be creditor or debtor, plaintiff and defendant. In support of this thesis it's showed that there was a proper legal structure around it. Nerva established one specific magistrate (praetor) designated to judge over the legal cases between private individuals and fiscus. The legal agents of the fiscus were the rationalis (and the procurator fisci from the Flavian dynasty ages); nevertheless the judicial actions themselves were made by the advocatus fisci, role created by Hadrian. They were appointed to defend its reasons in trial. According to this evidence the emperor never appeared in trial nor was he judged.

== Reforms and developments ==
From its very introduction the fiscus started a continuous process of enforcement with respect to the aerarium, until the word aerarium ended up representing only the municipal chest of Rome.

With Diocletian came a series of massive reforms, and total control over the finances of the empire fell to the new stronger central government. With these reforms the distinction between aerarium and fiscus was definitely abolished, even though some historians believe this union was already realized under the empire of Septimius Severus.

In the late imperial period, probably under Constantine, the fiscus was renamed largitiones, and it was entrusted to the comes sacrarum largitionum (count of the sacred largess) a proper appointed minister of finance. He maintained the general treasury and the intake of all the revenues.

== Other fisci ==
Beside the fiscus but independently from it Vespasian created the fiscus Alexandrinus and the fiscus Asiaticus to receive Egyptian and Asian revenues, formerly directed to the aerarium.

He also created the fiscus Iudaicus, to which the Jewish population was subjected.

== See also ==
- Comes
- Congiarium
- Fiscus Iudaicus
- Rationibus
- Roman finance
