= Officium (ancient Rome) =

Latin word with various meanings

Officium (pl.: officia) is a Latin word with various meanings in ancient Rome, including "service", "(sense of) duty", "courtesy", "ceremony" and the like. It commonly also referred to the office of a magistrate and his sometimes numerous staff, each of whom was called an officialis (hence the modern official).

The Notitia Dignitatum gives us uniquely detailed information, stemming from the very imperial chanceries, on the composition of the officia of many of the leading court, provincial, military and certain other officials of the two Roman empires c. 400 AD. While the details vary somewhat according to rank, from West (Rome) to East (Byzantium) and/or in particular cases, in general the leading staff would be about as follows (the English descriptions and other modern "equivalents" are approximate):

- Princeps officii was the chief of staff, permanent secretary or chef de cabinet
- Cornicularius was a military title, for an administrative deputy of various generals etc.
- Adiutor (literally "helper") seems to have been the chief (general) assistant, or adjutant
- Commentariensis was the keeper of "commentaries", an official diary
- Ab actis was the keeper of records, the archivist
- Numerarius ("accountant") seems to have been the receiver of taxes
- Subadiuva ("under-helper") seems to have been a general assistant
- Cura epistolarum was the curator of correspondence
- Regerendarius may have been a registrar
- Exceptor seem to have been a secretary
- Singularius has been called a notary, but the word can also refer to a bodyguard

Below those "dignities", there were often several hundred subordinate staff, sometimes slaves or freedmen, performing day-to-day administrative duties, not deemed worthy of any more detailed mention. They are only referred to collectively, by various terms in the plural, such as cohortalini (apparently the diminutive of cohortalis, the term suggesting a large number; see cohors amicorum).

== See also ==
- Magister officiorum

== Sources and references ==
- Pauly-Wissowa (German-language encyclopedia on anything relating to Classical Antiquity)
- Notitia dignitatum
