= Banking in ancient Rome =

In ancient Rome there were a variety of officials tasked with banking. These were the argentarii, mensarii, coactores, and nummularii. The argentarii were money changers. The role of the mensarii was to help people through economic hardships, the coactores were hired to collect money and give it to their employer, and the nummularii minted and tested currency. They offered credit systems and loans. Between 260 and the fourth century AD, Roman bankers disappear from the historical record, likely because of economic difficulties caused by the debasement of the currency.

== History ==
The earliest banks in ancient Rome were located in temples, as in the Etruscan civilization. They would charge interest on loans, exchange money, and track their finances through written records. Due to the piety of the officials and employees of these temples, the upper class of ancient Rome trusted these places to protect and hold their wealth. Typically, their money was stored in multiple temples. This practice was designed to protect their wealth in case an individual temple was destroyed or attacked in some way.

Another banking group in ancient Rome were the trapezites. They were predecessors of the argentarii, and they provided banking services in counting houses near the Forum. Roman bankers disappear from the historical record between 260 AD and the fourth century. Likely because the continued debasement of the currency hurt the economy, creating difficulties for the banking profession. By the mid-fourth century AD, the argentarii and numularii are mentioned again in ancient sources. They had acquired different roles.

== Types ==
=== Argentarii ===
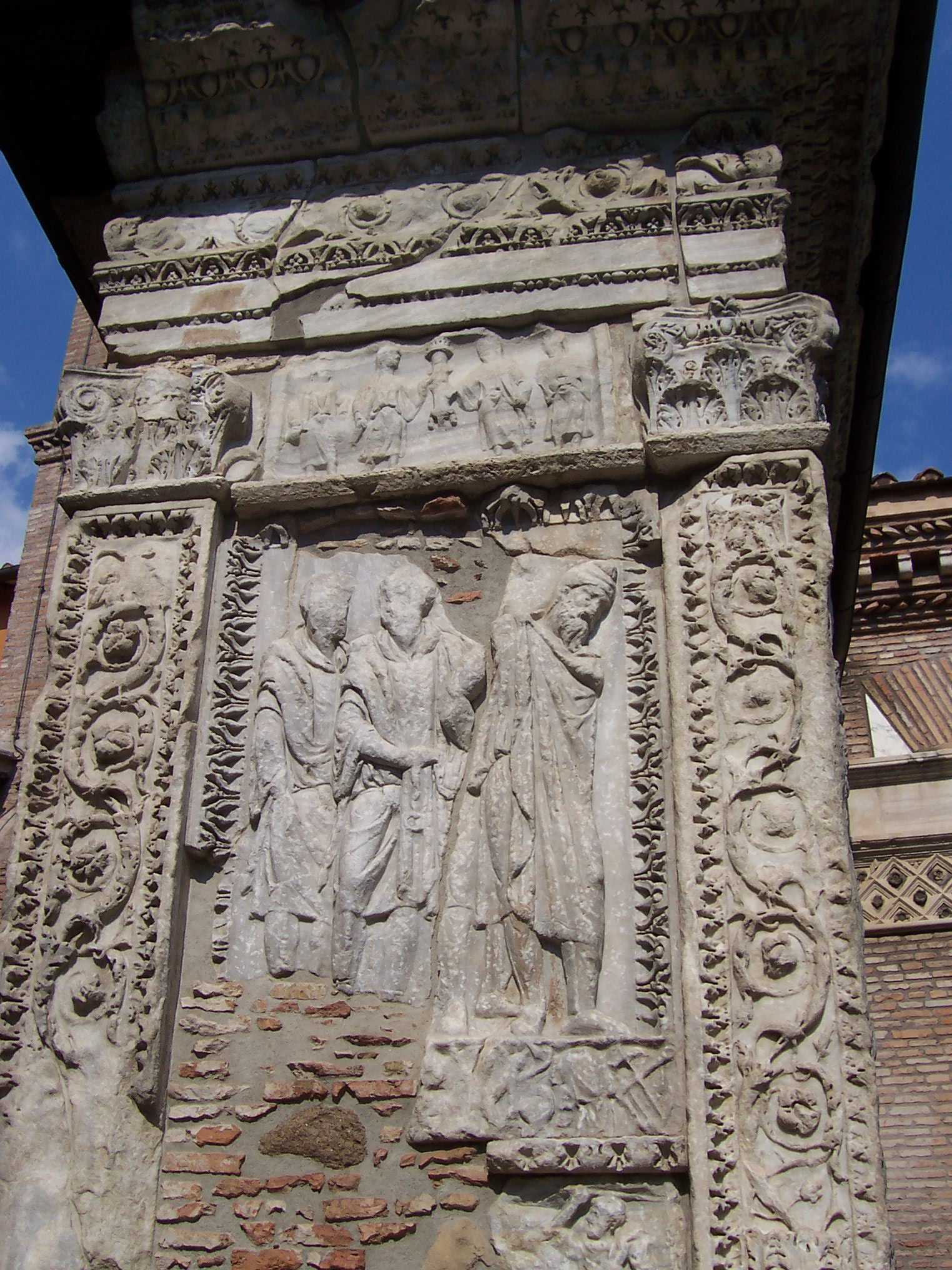
Arch of the Argentarii in Rome

The argentarii, also known as argenteae mensae exercitores, negotiatores stipis argentariae, and argenti distractores, were private money changers in ancient Rome supervised by the government. This group was organized into a guild with a limited number of members. They were commonly located at stalls, shops, tabernae, and in the forum. These locations were built by the censors and owned by the state.

The argentarii provided numerous services, such as providing loans, holding money, circulating money, exchanging currency, providing credit at auctions, and determining the quality and material of currency. They were also entrusted with paying off debts. Their powers would expand to include almost all forms of financial transactions. Despite this, their primary goal was to exchange foreign currency for Roman currency. Typically the clients of this group were not wealthy, as the upper class of ancient Rome had more secure methods of storing wealth.

Another group known as the expectores were tasked with keeping financial records, including those of the argentarii. The argentarii were likely founded around the 4th century BC. When they were established, they likely only functioned as a replacement for the previous Greek trapezitai and their abilities were likely limited to money-handling. By the 1st century BC they were capable of providing credit. They disappeared from the historical record for around 70 to 80 years after 250 AD, for unknown reasons.

=== Mensarii ===
The mensarii were state-appointed public bankers. Usually they were appointed during periods of poverty or war. Their goal was to prevent social unrest and help the plebeians overcome debt and economic hardships. This organization was established in 352 BCE to combat high levels of debt as a five-man commission known as the quinqueviri mensarii. They accomplished this by providing the population access to public services and loans as well as managing the circulation of currency.

This group evolved into the triumviri mensarii in 216 BCE. This was a commission of only three people, but performed the same duties as the previous organization. These two groups could perform similar functions to the argentarii, such as money holding and assaying currency.

=== Coactores ===
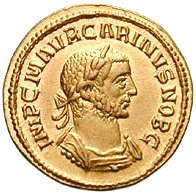
An ancient Roman coin produced by the Imperial mint

The coactores collected and gave money to their employers. They were used by the argentarii for this function since the 1st century BC. They disappeared from the historical record after the 2nd century AD. This organization was distinct from the argentarii.

There was another group in ancient Rome known as the coactores argentarii, who were responsible for depositing money and collecting debts at auctions. Neither of these groups provided credit to companies, nor did they grant loans to finance consumption, although they granted short-term commercial loans.

=== Nummularii ===
The nummularii were a group designed to mint and test new currency. To do this, they examined the metal which was used to make the coins using their senses and the patterns of the coins. They first appeared in the historical record in the 2nd century BC as money-changers. By the 2nd century AD they began to provide loans, deposit currency, and operate bank accounts.

They ran a bank and put new currency into circulation, and they removed foreign or old coins from circulation. Alongside this, they could hold money, sell goods, work at auctions, maintain records, exchange currency, and make payments on behalf of their clients. By the 3rd century, they were the last banking profession in ancient Rome, and they handled all banking affairs.

== Privileges and organization ==
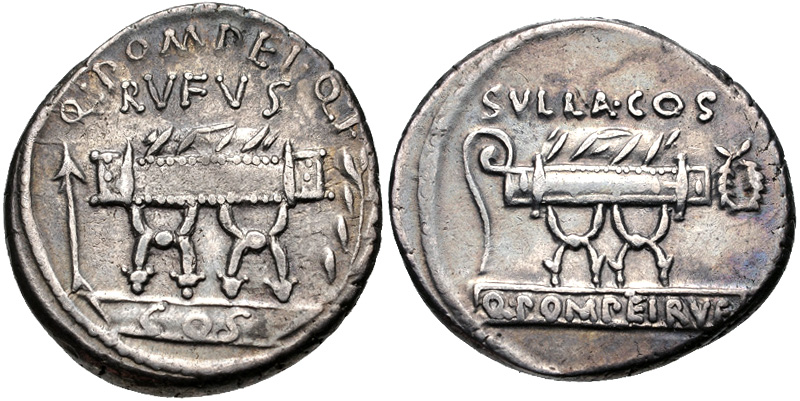
Ancient Roman denarius

Roman bankers provided a wide variety of services. They would serve as cashiers and money changers, they could sell goods at auctions, and they could determine the material and quality of currency or open money bases. If this base was irregular or open then the banker was permitted to reinvest or reuse the client's money. Their activities were concluded and recorded with written agreements.

In early Roman history most contracts were conducted orally, with witnesses used to confirm the legitimacy of the agreement. Later notaries were used to keep public written records of contracts. Roman bankers belonged to the plebeian or freedmen classes rather than the aristocracy. They sometimes became very wealthy. Typically they organized themselves into groups of two or three members. Many children of these bankers achieved equestrian rank.

Roman bankers were allowed to open bank accounts. These accounts were entered in a register. If a Roman was involved in a lawsuit, they were required to create these accounts. This was because these accounts were considered reliable proof in lawsuit cases. Bankers participated in the receptum argentarii, an agreement that involved three people: the banker, the client, and the third party. The banker would pay the money the client owned to the third party.

Stipulation was common in ancient Rome: the debtor was questioned by the creditor in the presence of witnesses, about their willingness to pay back the debt. Written contracts were used to document the transfer of the creditor's loan to the debtor. These contracts were usually simple, due to the illiteracy of the Roman population. Since Roman banks lacked any incentive to ensure that their client's deposits would remain safe during a bank run, they usually kept less in reserves than the full amount of their clients deposits. They were not required to insure their customers' deposits. There was very little regulation of Roman bankers, with most banks and bankers relying on trust. This meant that the clients lacked any protection or safety net in the event of a bank run or a financial crisis.

=== Credit ===
The nummularii offered a rudimentary credit system and they provided moneylending services. The coactores and the argentarii also gave credit to buyers at auctions. Credit services may also have been provided by entrepreneurs known as the faeneratores. Aristocratic financers were another source of credit. They used their own wealth to fund their loans to other members of the upper class or to foreign cities and nobles. Following auctions the coactores and the argentarii would impose on the buyers a time-limit for their payment, and they would pay the vendors the money which was owed to them.

Although these financial services were necessary for starting a business, almost all Romans would have engaged in credit. Most credit arrangements lasted a month, with an interest rate of 1%, per month. The Romans believed that anyone involved in trade should use credit. People who provided credit might also have sold their right to collect the debt to another party. In ancient Rome, credit transactions relied on trust. It was common for people to lose trust in their creditors, often resulting in a significant negative impact on the economy and the credit industry.

=== Loans ===
Loan defaults carried severe penalties, as their borrowers could be enslaved, mutilated, or sued. Most ancient Roman loans were linked to consumption. These loans allowed merchants to restock their goods more quickly and it allowed them to purchase more goods. They were often essential, as it was almost impossible for many people to live in ancient Rome without debt. Usually Roman loans were given to young nobles, and they generally had high interest rates. Another common option was to give loans to close family or friends as a method of averting risk.

It is possible that ancient Roman loans lacked a security deposit. However, ancient loans required some form of security. Usually, loans were made and credits were extended on risky terms, because the available capital typically exceeded the amount needed by borrowers. The senatorial elite were heavily involved in private lending, as both creditors and borrowers, and made loans from their personal fortunes on the basis of social connections.

There were a variety of types of ancient Roman loans. One kind, known as a mutuum, was made without interest. Under this kind of loan, the property rights passed to the banker. They were returned when the debt was paid off. Loans with interest were known as fenus or usura. Another kind of loan was the fenus nauticum or pecunia traiecticia. It was contracted between two individuals with the aid of an intermediary. It was common for the banks to play the role of the intermediary.

== See also ==
- Roman finance
