= Vir illustris =

Highest ranks within the senates of Ancient Rome and Constantinople

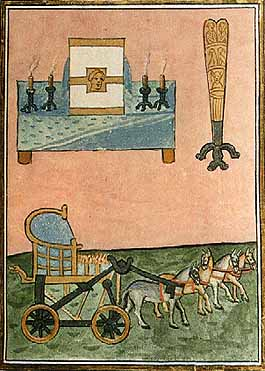
Insignia viri illustris praefecti praetorio per Illyricum, insignia from the Notitia Dignitatum

The title vir illustris (lit. 'illustrious man') is used as a formal indication of standing in late antiquity to describe the highest ranks within the senates of Rome and Constantinople. All senators had the title vir clarissimus (lit. 'very famous man'); but from the mid fourth century onwards, vir illustris and vir spectabilis (lit. 'admirable man', a lower rank than illustris) were used to distinguish holders of high office.

== History ==
=== Origins ===
The custom of Roman senators of late antiquity appending the title of vir clarissimus to their names developed gradually over the first two centuries. During the fourth century, the senatorial order greatly increased in number, so that the title became more common and new titles were devised to distinguish senators of a higher dignity, namely vir spectabilis and vir illustris. The first instance of vir illustris occurred in AD 354 with its use by the praefectus praetorio. For some decades it was used inconsistently, but then more regularly, perhaps in connection with a formal codification of honours by Emperor Valentinian I in AD 372.

=== Offices ===
The offices that had a right to the title varied with time. The Notitia Dignitatum of the early AD fifth century attached it to the offices of the:

- Praefectus praetorio ('praetorian prefect').
- Praefectus urbi ('urban prefect').
- Magister militum ('master of the soldiers').
- Praepositus sacri cubiculi ('officer of the sacred chamber').
- Magister officiorum ('master of offices').
- Quaestor sacri palatii ('quaestor of the sacred palace').
- Comes sacrarum largitionum ('count of the sacred largess').
- Comes rerum privatarum ('count of the [imperial] private property').
- Comes domesticorum equitum sive peditum ('count of the household cavalry or infantry'). Beyond these, the title is also frequently given to consuls, occasionally to lower offices. In these cases the title may show a broadening of the criteria or may be simply an honorary grant to an individual.

=== Later developments ===
The Illustres soon were regarded as the active membership of the Senate; and by the middle of the AD fifth century, Spectabiles and Clarissimi were no longer expected to participate in the Senate. By the reign of Emperor Justinian I, all senators were considered Illustres. At the same time the title of "illustris" had been similarly devalued below that of "clarissimus" in the AD fourth century, and high officials were indicated with the titles of "vir gloriosus" or "gloriosissimus" and "vir magnificus".

== Written forms ==
In ancient inscriptions and manuscripts, the spelling "inlustris" is more frequent. Because the illustres were a subset of the clarissimi, the title is often written as "vir clarissimus et illustris", especially in official documents. The shorter title was commonly abbreviated "v. i." (pl.: "vv. ii."), "v. inl.", or "vir inl." and the longer title as "v. c. et inl."

In Merovingian and Carolingian times, the spellings vir inluster and viri inlustres were common.
