= Comes sacrarum largitionum =

Fiscal official of the Roman and Byzantine Empires

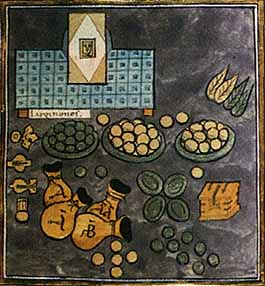
The insignia of the comes s. largitionum in the Notitia Dignitatum: money bags and pieces of ore signifying his control over mines and mints, and the codicil of his appointment on a stand

The comes sacrarum largitionum ("Count of the Sacred Largesses"; in Greek: κόμης τῶν θείων θησαυρῶν, kómes tōn theíon thesaurōn) was one of the senior fiscal officials of the late Roman Empire and the early Byzantine Empire.

Although it is first attested in 342/345, its creation must date to ca. 318, under Emperor Constantine the Great (r. 306–337). The comes was the successor of the Principate-era rationalis, and supervised those financial sectors that were left outside the purview of the praetorian prefects: the taxation of senators, the chrysargyron tax, customs duties, mines, mints and state-run mills and textile factories. Initially, the comes also controlled the emperor's private domains, but these passed under the control of the comes rerum privatarum by the end of the 4th century. He also exercised some judicial functions related to taxation in his administrative courts in particular in matters of fiscal debt.

The office of the comes gradually declined in importance after the late 5th century, especially after Emperor Anastasius I (r. 491–518) abolished the hated chrysargyron. He remained however one of the main fiscal ministers, controlling an array of bureaux (scrinia) and with an extensive staff detached to the provinces. The last comes known is mentioned under the Emperor Phocas (r. 602–610). He was succeeded by the sakellarios and the logothetes tou genikou, who remained the chief fiscal ministers in the middle Byzantine period (7th–11th centuries).

== See also ==
- Roman finance

== Sources ==
- Bury, John B. (1911). The Imperial Administrative System of the Ninth Century. With a Revised Text of the Kletorologion of Philotheos. Oxford University Publishing. pp. 78ff.
- Cutler, Anthony; Kazhdan, Alexander (1991). "Comes sacrarum largitionum". In Kazhdan, Alexander (ed.). The Oxford Dictionary of Byzantium. Oxford and New York: Oxford University Press. p. 486. ISBN 0-19-504652-8.
