= Aerarium =

Public treasury in ancient Rome

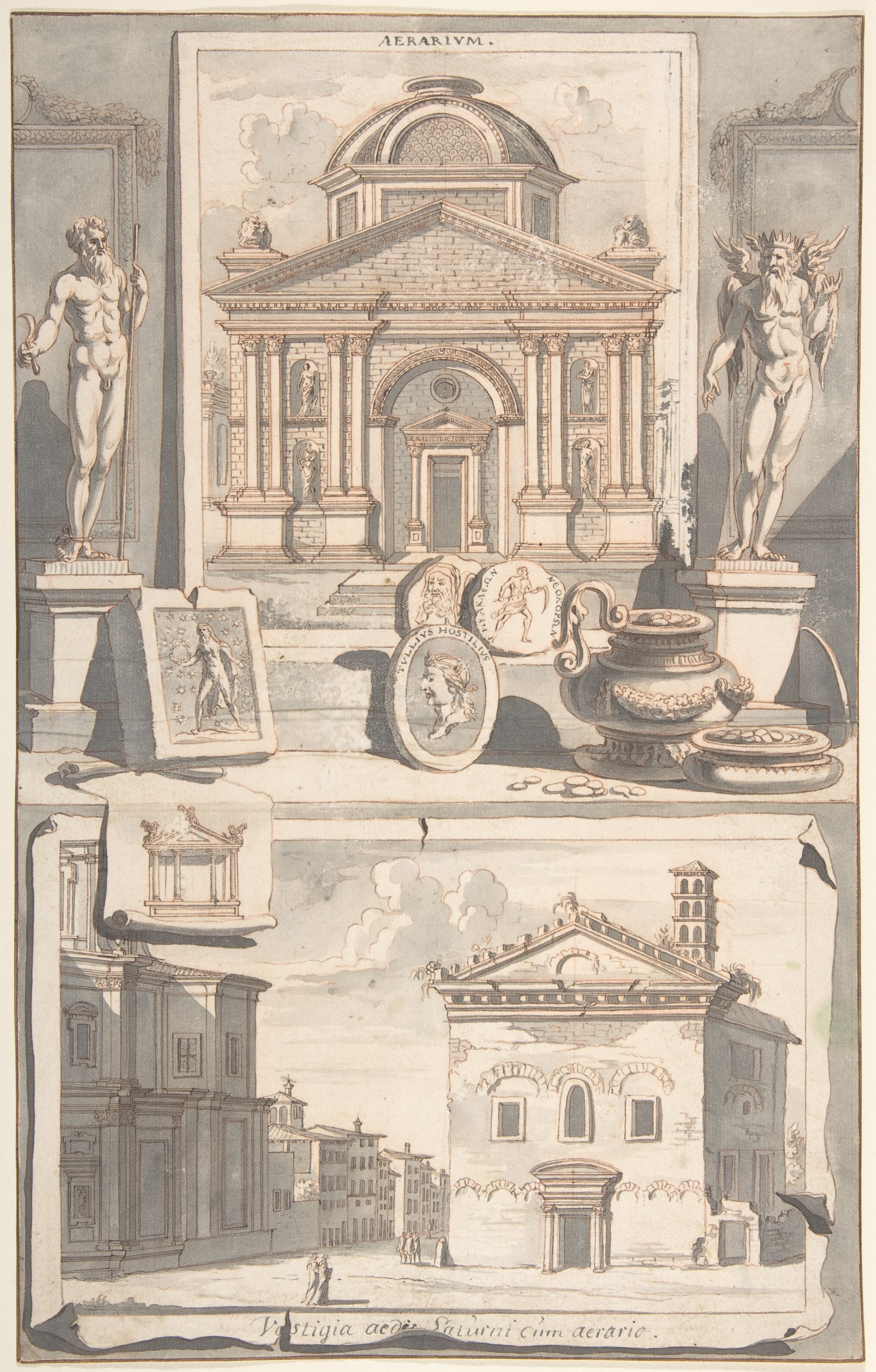
The Aerarium Saturni (top) and its ruins (bottom); drawing by Jan Goeree, before 1704

Aerarium, from aes ("bronze, money") + -ārium ("place for"), was the name given in Ancient Rome to the public treasury, and in a secondary sense to the public finances.

== Aerarium populi Romani ==
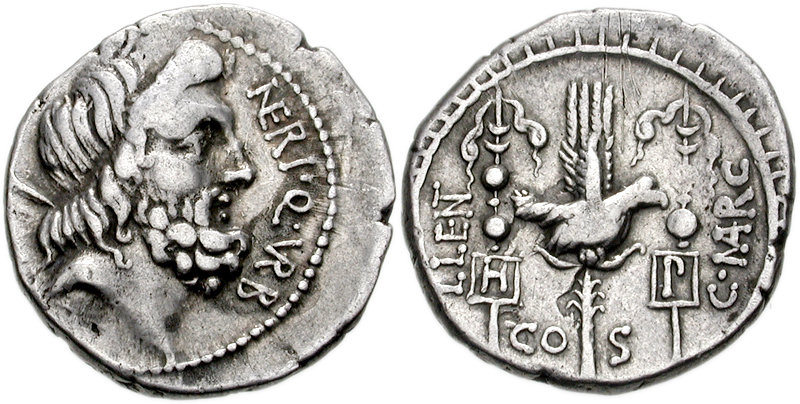
Denarius minted by Gnaeus Nerius, who was urban quaestor in 49 BC. The obverse depicts Saturn, in whose temple the aerarium and the standards of the legions were kept. The reverse shows an aquila between two standards, inscribed H for Hastati and P for Principes, and the names of the consuls.

The main aerarium, that of the Roman people, was the aerarium Saturni located below the Temple of Saturn at the foot of the Capitoline hill. The Roman state stored here financial and non-financial state documents – including Roman laws and senatus consulta – along with the public treasury. Laws did not become valid until they were deposited there. It also held the standards of the Roman legions; during the Roman Republic, the urban quaestors managed it under the supervision and control of the Senate. By the classical republican period, the Senate had exclusive authority to disburse funds from it.

Caesar replaced quaestorian administration with the administration of two aediles. In 28 BC, Augustus transferred the aerarium to two praefecti aerarii, chosen annually by the Senate from ex-praetors. In AD 23, these were replaced by two praetors (praetores aerarii or ad aerarium), selected by lot during their term of office. Claudius in 44 restored the quaestors, but had them nominated by the emperor for three years. In 56, Nero substituted two ex-praetors selected under the same conditions.

By the time of the late republic, the provincial governors had their own provincial treasuries, called a fiscus (initially referring to a "money bag"). Over time, the governors' exchequers merged with that of the emperor into an imperial fiscus. However, after a time, as the power of the emperors further increased, this distinction between senatorially-administered and provincial treasuries became irrelevant. Revenues from the Senatorial provinces increasingly became transferred from the aerarium to the fiscus through the early Principate. By the reign of Honorius and the Theodosian code, any vestigial distinctions had fallen away.

The extent to which records were centralised in the aerarium may be exaggerated. The various reforms done at previous times may imply negligent management, falsification, or loss of records. Even in the Republican period, Cicero lamented the extent to which the public records were managed and in later periods, the extent to which the public records were really used for reference is controversial: scholars, eg Mommsen, have argued that the sources of law in the later empire were not based on state records but rather those of private individuals, law schools, and provincial administrators.

== Aerarium sanctius ==
In addition to the common treasury, supported by the general taxes and charged with the ordinary expenditure, there was a special reserve fund, also in the Temple of Saturn, the aerarium sanctum (or sanctius). This fund probably originally consisted of the spoils of war. Afterwards it was maintained chiefly by a five per cent tax on the value of all manumitted slaves. This fund was not to be touched except in cases of extreme necessity. This continued until 49 BC when Julius Caesar, after seizing the city of Rome during the civil war looted this special fund.

== Aerarium militare ==
Besides creating the fiscus, Augustus also established in AD 6 a military treasury (aerarium militare) as a fund for veterans' retirement benefits. It was first endowed by 170 million sesterces of the emperor's own funds, supported by new taxes, a five per cent inheritance tax and a one per cent sales tax on auctions. Its administration was in the hands of three praefecti aerarii militaris. At first these were appointed by lot, but afterwards by the emperor, from ex-praetors, for three years.

== Tribuni aerarii ==
The tribuni aerarii ("tribunes of the treasury") have been the subject of much discussion. They are supposed by some to be identical with the curatores tribuum, and to have been the officials who, under the Servian organization, levied the war-tax (tributum) in the tribes and the poll-tax on the aerarii. They also acted as paymasters of the equites and of the soldiers on service in each tribe. By the lex Aurelia (70 BC) the list of judices was composed, in addition to senators and equites, of tribuni aerarii. Whether these were the successors of the above, or a new order closely connected with the equites, or even the same as the latter, is uncertain.

According to Theodor Mommsen, they were persons who possessed the equestrian census, but no public horse. They were removed from the list of judices by Julius Caesar, but replaced by Augustus. According to Madvig, the original tribuni aerarii were not officials at all, but private individuals of considerable means, quite distinct from the curatores tribuum, who undertook certain financial work connected with their own tribes. Then, as in the case of the equites, the term was subsequently extended to include all those who possessed the property qualification that would have entitled them to serve as tribuni aerarii.

== Publicum ==
Prior to the decemvirate in 451 BC, there was a separate institution known as the publicum.

On a number of occasions it is recorded that various patricians incurred the anger of the plebs by paying the spoils from war into the publicum rather than the aerarium, for example Quintus Fabius Vibulanus in 485 BC following a victory over the Volsci and Aequi. From this it has been argued that the publicum was a fund administered by the patricians, but this has been disputed by others.
