= Consularis =

Ancient Roman title, given to those who had served as consuls

Consularis is a Latin adjective indicating something pertaining to the position or rank of consul. In Ancient Rome it was also used as a noun (plural consulares) to designate those senators who had held the office of consul or attained consular rank as a special honour. In Late Antiquity, the title became also a gubernatorial rank for provincial governors.

== Ex-Consuls ==
In the Roman Republic, the term vir consularis (rendered in Greek as ὑπατικός, hypatikos) or consularis designated any senator who had served as consul. The distinction was accompanied by specific privileges and honours, and was normally a necessary qualification for a number of magistracies: the posts of dictator and his deputy, the magister equitum (although some cases seem to refute that), the post of censor as well as the governance of certain provinces as proconsuls. The distinction was attached to their wives as well (consularis femina, in Greek ὑπατική or ὑπάτισσα). Under the Principate, the status of consularis could be gained, without holding the consulship, by the gift of the emperor, either through admission to the senate (adlectio inter consulares) or (more rarely) through the award of the consular insignia (ornamenta/insignia consularia).

Under the Principate, a number of senior magistracies were created for consulares:

- The position of praefectus urbi, governor of Rome and its environs.
- Under Hadrian (r. 117–138), Italy was divided into four judicial jurisdictions, each with a consularis at its head. This institution was abolished soon after Hadrian's death, however.
- Under Alexander Severus (r. 222–235), a council of fourteen consulares, the consulares sacrae urbis, was created to assist the praefectus urbi, with each one representing one of the fourteen regions of Rome.
- The consulares operum publicorum, alvei Tiberis et cloacarum, public officials (curatores) responsible for public works, the regulation of the Tiber and the maintenance of Rome's sanitation system.

== Provincial governors ==
Already during the Republic, certain provinces were reserved for ex-consuls. This tradition carried into the Principate following the grant of an enormous provincial command to Augustus in 27 BC effectively dividing the empire between so-called Imperial and Senatorial provinces. Of the latter, two were specifically reserved for consulares, the proconsular provinces of Asia and Africa proconsularis. Consulares could also hold office in Imperial provinces as the Emperor's legates (legatus Augusti pro praetore), alongside legates who held the rank of praetor and officials from the equestrian order styled procuratores.

As the formal title of legatus Augusti did not otherwise distinguish rank, those of consular standing occasionally attached the form consularis to their title, a practice which became commonplace in the 3rd century. As a result, the latter, simpler title began to replace the formal title, and to acquire a generic meaning of "provincial governor". This evolution was formalized in the reforms of Diocletian (r. 284–305) and Constantine the Great (r. 306–337). Aside from its traditional meaning, designating holders of consular rank, the term consularis now came to designate a class of provincial governors. Its holders outranked the correctores and praesides, but were still at the very bottom of the senatorial hierarchy, with the senatorial rank of vir clarissimus, while a holder of consular rank was styled vir illustris. In a handful of cases, serving consulares were raised to proconsular rank, while Valentinian I (r. 364–375) and Valens (r. 364–378) gave the consulares of Numidia the exceptional right to be preceded by six instead of five fasces-bearing lictores.

According to the Notitia Dignitatum (circa 400), the following provinces were administered by a consularis:

in fifteen provinces in the Eastern Roman Empire

- five in the Diocese of the East: Palaestina Prima, Phoenice, Syria Prima, Cilicia Prima and Cyprus
- three in the Diocese of Asia: Pamphylia, Hellespontus and Lydia
- two in the Diocese of Pontus: Galatia and Bithynia
- two in the Diocese of Thrace: Europa and Thracia
- three in the Diocese of Illyricum: Creta (Crete), Macedonia and Dacia Mediterranea
- the Diocese of Egypt—sui generis as the imperial crown domain—is explicitly said to have none

in twenty-one provinces in the Western Roman Empire

- one in the Diocese of Pannonia: Pannonia Secunda
- eight in the two Italian dioceses: Venetia et Histria, Aemilia, Liguria, Flaminia et Picenum Annonarium, Tuscia et Umbria, Picenum Suburbicarium, Campania and Sicilia
- two in the Diocese of Africa: Byzacena and Numidia
- three in the Diocese of Spain: Baetica, Lusitania, Gallaecia
- six in the Diocese of Gaul: Viennensis, Lugdunensis Prima, Germania Prima, Germania Secunda, Belgica Prima and Belgica Secunda
- two in the Diocese of Britain: Maxima Caesariensis and Valentia

The Notitia gives the following staff (officium) for a consularis of the West: princeps officii (detached from the praetorian prefecture), a cornicularius, two tabularii, an adiutor, a commentariensis, an ab actis, a subadiuva, and various exceptores and cohortalini, i.e. menial staff. For the East, the officium was slightly different: princeps officii, cornicularius, commentariensis, adiutor, numerarius, ab actis, a libellis, and the usual exceptores and cohortalini.

The Synecdemus, written some time shortly before 535, lists the following provinces under consulares: Europa, Thracia, Macedonia Prima, Creta, Epirus Nova, Dacia Mediterranea, Hellespontus, Phrygia Pacatiana and Phrygia Salutaris, Lydia, Pisidia, Lycaonia, Pamphylia, Lycia, Caria, Pontica Prima (Bithynia), Galatia, Cappadocia Prima, Helenopontus, Cilicia Prima, Cyprus, Syria Prima, Phoenice, Palaestina Prima, Arabia, and one whose name is illegible.

Following the reconquest of North Africa, in 534, Tripolitania was given a consularis, while Numidia was downgraded to a mere praeses. However, in 535 Emperor Justinian I (r. 527–565) carried out a wide-ranging administrative reorganization. The provinces of Palaestina Secunda, Syria Secunda, Theodorias, Osrhoene, Armenia Secunda, Armenia Magna, Cappadocia Secunda, Rhodope, Haemimontus and Augustamnica (this is possibly an error) were placed under consulares, while Epirus Nova, Dacia Mediterranea, Phrygia Pacatiana, Galatia, Syria Prima and Arabia were placed under governors of other ranks.
