= List of Late Roman provinces =

This article presents a list of Roman provinces in the Late Roman Empire, as found in the Notitia Dignitatum.

== Praetorian prefecture of Gauls ==
In Latin, Gallia was also sometimes used as a general term for all Celtic peoples and their territories, such as all Brythons, including Germanic and Iberian provinces that also had a population with a Celtic culture. The plural, Galliarum in Latin, indicates that all of these are meant, not just Caesar's Gaul (several modern countries).

=== Diocese of Gallia ===
Gallia covered about half of the Gallic provinces of the early empire:

- in what is now northern and central France, roughly the part north of the Loire (called after the capital Lugdunum, modern Lyon)
  - Belgica II
  - Lugdunensis I
  - Lugdunensis II
  - Lugdunensis III
  - Lugdunensis IV Senonia
- in Belgium, Luxembourg, part of present-day Netherlands (below the Rhine), on the left bank (west) of the Rhine
  - Germania II
  - Belgica II
- in what are now parts of France and Germany on the western bank of the Rhine
  - Belgica I
  - Belgica II
  - Germania I
  - Germania II
- in what are now parts of France and Switzerland:
  - Alpes Poeninae et Graiae
  - Maxima Sequanorum

=== Diocesis Viennensis ===
The diocese of Vienna was named after the city of Vienna (now Vienne), and almost entirely in present-day France, roughly south of the Loire. It was originally part of Caesar's newly conquered province of Transalpine Gaul, but a separate diocese from the start.

- Viennensis
- Alpes Maritimae
- Aquitanica I
- Aquitanica II
- Novempopulana
- Narbonensis I
- Narbonensis II

In the fifth century, Viennensis was replaced by a diocese of Septem Provinciae ('7 Provinces') with similar boundaries.

=== Diocese of Hispania ===
Hispania was the name of the whole Iberian Peninsula. It covered Hispania and the westernmost province of Roman Africa:

- Baetica
- Hispania Balearica (the Mediterranean islands)
- Carthaginiensis
- Tarraconensis
- Gallaecia
- Lusitania
- Mauretania Tingitana or Hispania Nova, in North Africa

=== Diocese of Britannia ===
- Maxima Caesariensis
- Valentia
- Britannia Prima
- Britannia Secunda
- Flavia Caesariensis

== Praetorian prefecture of Italy and Africa (western) ==
Originally there was a single diocese of Italia, but it was eventually split into a northern section and a southern section. The division of Italy into regions had already been established by Aurelian.

=== Diocese of Italia suburbicaria ===
Suburbicaria indicates proximity to Rome, the Urbs (capital city). It included the islands, which were previously considered outside Italy.

- Campania
- Tuscania et Umbria
- Picenum Suburbicarium
- Apulia et Calabria
- Bruttia et Lucania
- Samnium
- Valeria
- Corsica
- Sicilia
- Sardinia

=== Diocese of Italia annonaria ===
Annonaria refers to a reliance on the area for the provisioning of Rome. It encompassed northern Italy and Raetia.

- Venetia et Histria
- Aemilia
- Liguria
- Flaminia et Picenum Annonarium
- Alpes Cottiae
- Raetia Prima
- Raetia Secunda

=== Diocese of Africa ===
Africa included the central part of Roman North Africa:

- Africa or Zeugitana
- Byzacena
- Mauretania Caesariensis
- Mauretania Sitifensis
- Numidia
- Tripolitania

== Praetorian Prefecture of Illyricum ==
The Prefecture of Illyricum was named after the former province of Illyricum. It originally included two dioceses, the Diocese of Pannonia and the Diocese of Moesia. Constantine I later split the Diocese of Moesia into two dioceses: the Diocese of Macedonia and the Diocese of Dacia.

=== Diocese of Pannonia ===
Pannonia was one of the two dioceses in the eastern quarters of the Tetrarchy not belonging to the cultural Greek half of the empire (the other was Dacia); It was transferred to the western empire when Theodosius I fixed the final split of the two empires in 395.

- Dalmatia
- Noricum Mediterraneum
- Noricum Ripense
- Pannonia Prima
- Pannonia Secunda
- Savia
- Valeria Ripensis

=== Diocese of Dacia ===
The Dacians had lived in the Transylvania area, annexed to the Empire by Trajan. However, during the invasions of the third century Dacia was largely abandoned. Some inhabitants evacuated from the abandoned province settled on the south side of the Danube. They renamed their new homeland Dacia to diminish the impact that abandoning the original Dacia had on the Empire's prestige. The diocese was transferred to the western empire in 384 by Theodosius I, probably in partial compensation to the empress Justina for his recognition of the usurpation of Magnus Maximus in Britannia, Gaul and Hispania.

- Dacia Mediterranea
- Dacia Ripensis
- Moesia Prima
- Dardania
- Praevalitana

=== Diocese of Macedonia ===
The Diocese of Macedonia was transferred to the western empire in 384 by Theodosius I, probably in partial compensation to the empress Justina for his recognition of the usurpation of Magnus Maximus in Britannia, Gaul and Hispania.

- Macedonia Prima
- Macedonia Salutaris (or Macedonia Secunda)
- Thessalia
- Epirus vetus
- Epirus nova
- Achaea
- Creta

== Praetorian Prefecture of Oriens ==
As the rich home territory of the eastern emperor, the Oriens ("East") prefecture would persist as the core of the Byzantine Empire long after the fall of Rome. Its praetorian prefect would be the last to survive, but his office was transformed into an essentially internal minister, stripped of its original military function.

=== Diocese of Thrace ===
Thrace was the easternmost corner of the Balkans (the only part outside the Illyricum prefecture) and the European hinterland of Constantinople.

- Europa
- Thracia
- Haemimontus
- Rhodope
- Moesia II
- Scythia

=== Diocese of Asia ===
Asia (or Asia Minor) in Antiquity stood for Anatolia. This diocese (the name means 'the Asian ones') centred on the earlier Roman province of Asia, and only covered the rich western part of the peninsula, mainly near the Aegean Sea.

- Asia
- Hellespontus (i.e. near the Sea of Marmara, so closest to Greece)
- Pamphylia
- Caria
- Lydia
- Lycia
- Lycaonia
- Pisidia
- Phrygia I Pacatiana · Phrygia II Salutaris
- the adjoining Aegean islands in the province Insulae

=== Diocese of Pontus ===
Pontus is the Latinized form of Greek Pontos, the name of a Hellenistic kingdom, which in turn is derived from the Euxine Pontus, the Greco-Roman name of the Black Sea.

It mainly contains parts of Asia minor near those coasts (as well as the mountainous centre), but also includes the north of very variable border with Rome's enemy Parthia/Persia.

- Bithynia
- Galatia I · Galatia II Salutaris
- Paphlagonia
- Honorias
- Cappadocia I · Cappadocia II
- Helenopontus
- Pontus Polemoniacus
- Armenia I · II, III · IV added at the time of Justinian

=== Diocese of Oriens ===
The Eastern diocese shared its geographic name with the prefecture it belonged to, even after it lost its richest part, Egypt, becoming a separate diocese; but militarily crucial on the Persian (Sassanid) border and unruly desert tribes.

It comprised mainly the modern Arabic Mashriq (Syria, Lebanon, Iraq, Israel, the Palestinian Territories and Jordan) except for the desert hinterland:

- Arabia
- Palaestina I
- Palaestina II
- Palaestina Salutaris
- Syria I
- Syria II
- Phoenice I · Phoenice II Libanensis
- Euphratensis
- Osroene
- Mesopotamia

Further it contained the southeastern coast of Asia Minor and the close island of Cyprus

- Cilicia I · Cilicia II
- Isauria
- Cyprus

=== Diocese of Aegyptus ===
This diocese, comprising northeastern Africa—mainly Egypt, the rich granary and traditional personal domain of the emperors—was the only diocese that was not under a vicarius, but whose head retained the unique title of Praefectus Augustalis. It was created by a split of the Diocese of Oriens.

All but one, the civilian governors were of the modest rank of Praeses provinciae.

- Aegyptus (in a narrow sense) came to designate Lower Egypt around Alexandria. Originally it was named Aegyptus Iovia (from Jupiter, for the Augustus Diocletian). Later it was divided into two provinces.
- Augustamnica was the remainder of Lower Egypt, together with the eastern part of the Nile delta (13 'cities') – the only Egyptian province under a Corrector, a lower ranking governor. Originally it was named Aegyptus Herculia (for Diocletian's junior, the Caesar; with ancient Memphis). Later it was divided in two provinces
- Thebais was Upper Egypt. Nubia south of Philae had been abandoned to tribal people. Later it was divided into two provinces, Superior and Inferior.
- Arcadia (also Arcadia Ægypti; not to be confused with Arcadia in Greece)

Apart from modern Egypt, Aegyptus also comprised the former province of Cyrenaica, being the east of modern Libya (an ancient name for the whole African continent as well). Cyrenaica was split into two provinces, each under a praeses:

- Libya Superior
- Libya Inferior

== See also ==
- Laterculus Veronensis
