= Roman diocese =

Administrative unit of the Roman Empire

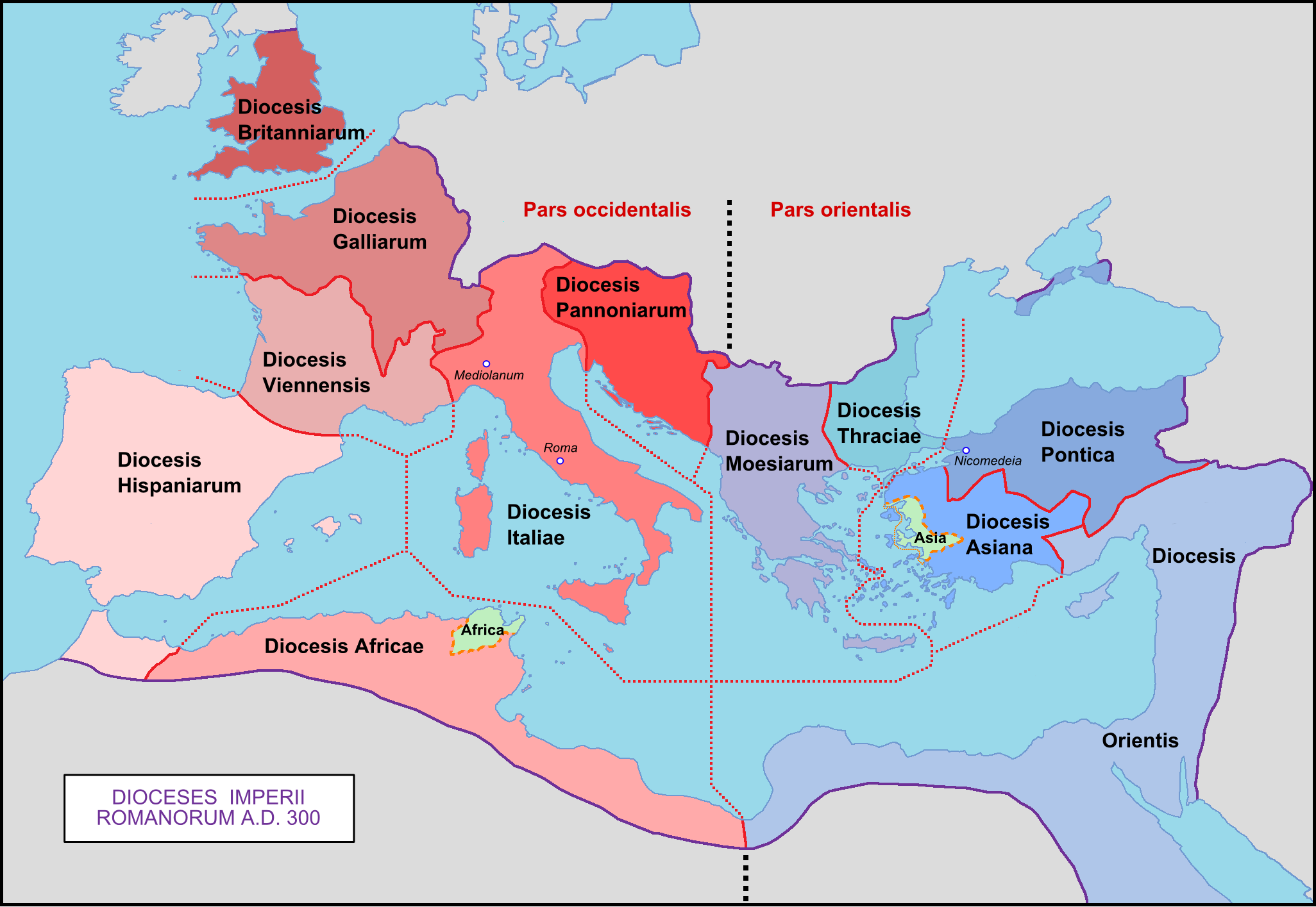
The division of the empire into Praetorian prefectures and dioceses after the first reorganisation under the Tetrarchy

In the Late Roman Empire, usually dated AD 284 to 641, the regional governance district known as the Roman or civil diocese was made up of a grouping of provinces each headed by a vicarius, the vicars being the representatives of praetorian prefects (who governed directly the dioceses they were resident in). There were initially twelve dioceses, rising to fourteen by the end of the 4th century.

The term diocese comes from the Latin dioecēsis, which derives from the Ancient Greek dioíkēsis (διοίκησις) meaning 'administration', 'management', 'assize district', or 'group of provinces'.

== Historical development ==
=== Tetrarchy (286–305) ===
Two major reforms to the administrative divisions of the empire were undertaken during the Tetrarchy.

The first of these was the multiplication of the number of provinces, which had remained largely unchanged since the time of Augustus, from 48 at the beginning of Diocletian's reign to around a hundred by the time of his abdication. The multiplication of the provinces was probably undertaken for military, financial, and economic reasons. It brought the governor closer to the cities which were responsible for the collection of taxes. It also limited the power of the governors and the autonomy of the cities. At the same time, the status of the provinces was regularized. Egypt lost its unique status and was divided into three provinces, while Italia was 'provincialized' – the numbered regiones established by Augustus received names and were governed by correctores. The distinction between senatorial and imperial provinces was abolished and henceforth all governors were appointed by the Emperor.

In order to compensate for the weakening of the provinces and to maintain the link between the Imperial centre and the individual provinces, the dioceses were created as a new territorial subdivision above the level of the province. The empire was divided into twelve dioceses. The largest of these, the Diocese of the East, encompassed sixteen provinces. Each diocese was governed by an agens vices praefectorum praetorio (Acting Representatives of the Praetorian Prefects) or simply Vicar (vicarius), under the Praetorian prefect, although some provinces were governed directly by the Praetorian Prefect. These vicars had previously been ad hoc representatives of the prefects, but they were now made into permanent, regularised positions. The vicar controlled the provincial governors (variously titled as consulares, correctores, praesides) and heard appeals of cases decided at the provincial level (parties could decide whether to appeal to the vicar or the praetorian prefect). The provinces governed by proconsuls (Africa and Asia) remained outside the vicars' jurisdiction,. as did the cities of Rome and Constantinople, which were governed by a Praefectus urbi instead. The vicars had no military powers. Troops stationed in the dioceses fell under the command of a comes rei militaris, who was directly under the control of the magister militum and was in charge of the duces who had the military command of individual provinces.

Many modern scholars date the introduction of the dioceses to AD 296–297. A passage of Lactantius, who was hostile to Diocletian because of his persecution of the Christians, seems to indicate the existence of vicarii praefectorum in the time of Diocletian:

And so that everything would be filled with terror, the provinces were also sliced to bits; many governors and more offices brooded over individual regions and almost every city, as well as many rationales, magistri, and vicarii praefectorum, all of whose civil acts were exceedingly rare, but whose condemnations and proscriptions were common, whose exactions of innumerable taxes were not so much frequent as constant, and the damage from these taxes was unbearable.

— Lactantius, De Mortibus Persecutorum 7.4

Thus Lactantius refers to the vicarii praefectorum as being active already in Diocletian's time. Other sources from Diocletian's reign mention one Aurelius Agricolanus who was an agens vices praefectorum praetorio active in Hispania and condemned a centurion named Marcellus to be executed for his Christianity, as well as an Aemilianus Rusticianus, who is considered by some scholars to have been the first vicar of the Diocese of the East that we know of. Lactantius also mentions one Sossianus Hierocles as an ex vicario active in the East in this period. Septimius Valentio is also attested as agens vices praefectorum praetorio of Rome between 293 and 296. However, these sources do not prove that these vicarii or agentes vices were already in charge of dioceses with a well-defined and stable territory. Septimius Valentio in particular was definitely the commander of the Praetorian Guard during a period when the Praetorian Prefect was absent from the city, but was not in charge of Italia Suburbicaria. According to Zuckerman, the establishment of the dioceses should instead be dated to around AD 313/14, after the annexation of Armenia into the Roman empire and the meeting of Constantine and Licinius in Mediolanum. The matter remains controversial.

=== Constantinian reforms (326–337) ===
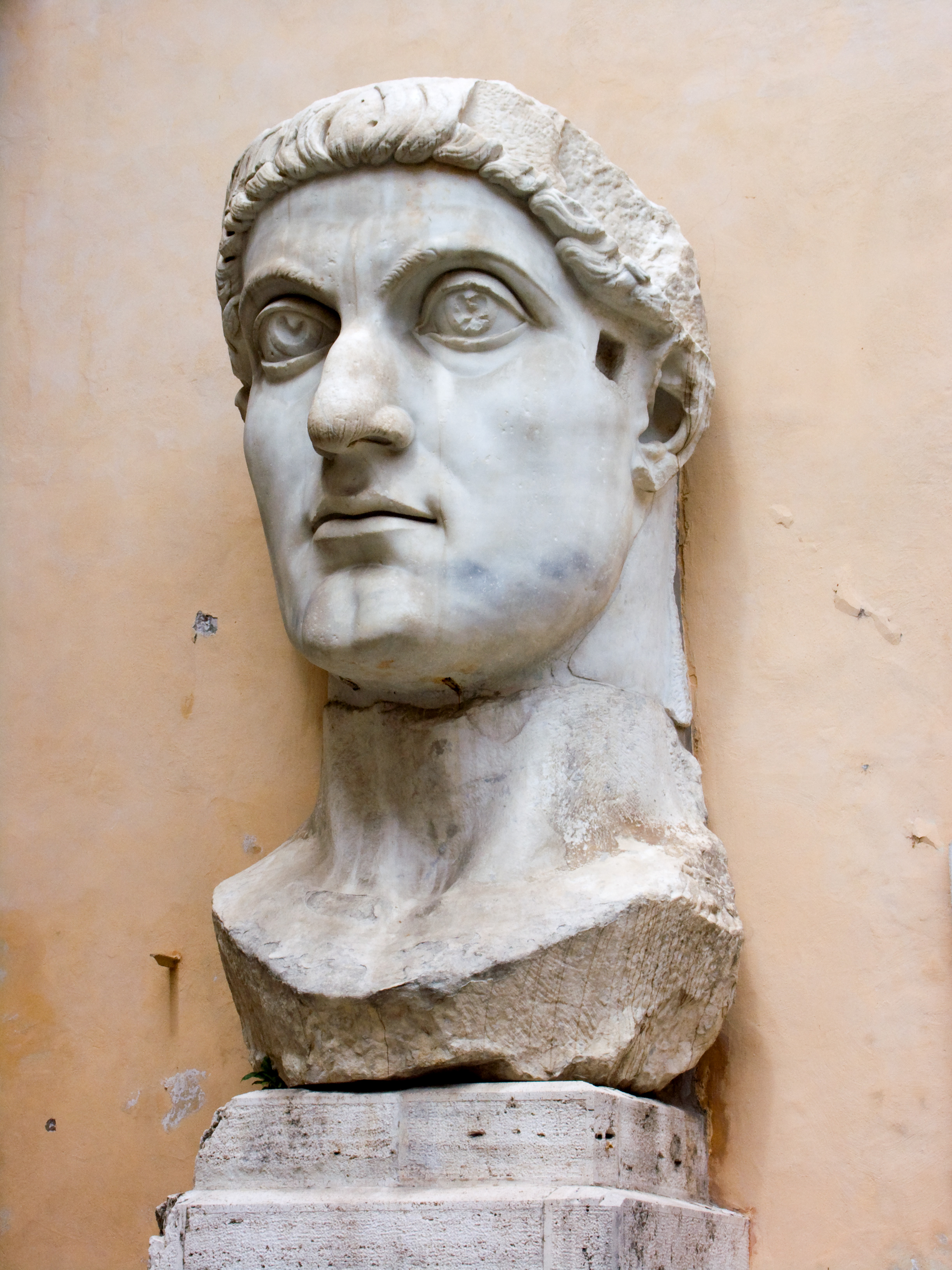
Emperor Constantine.

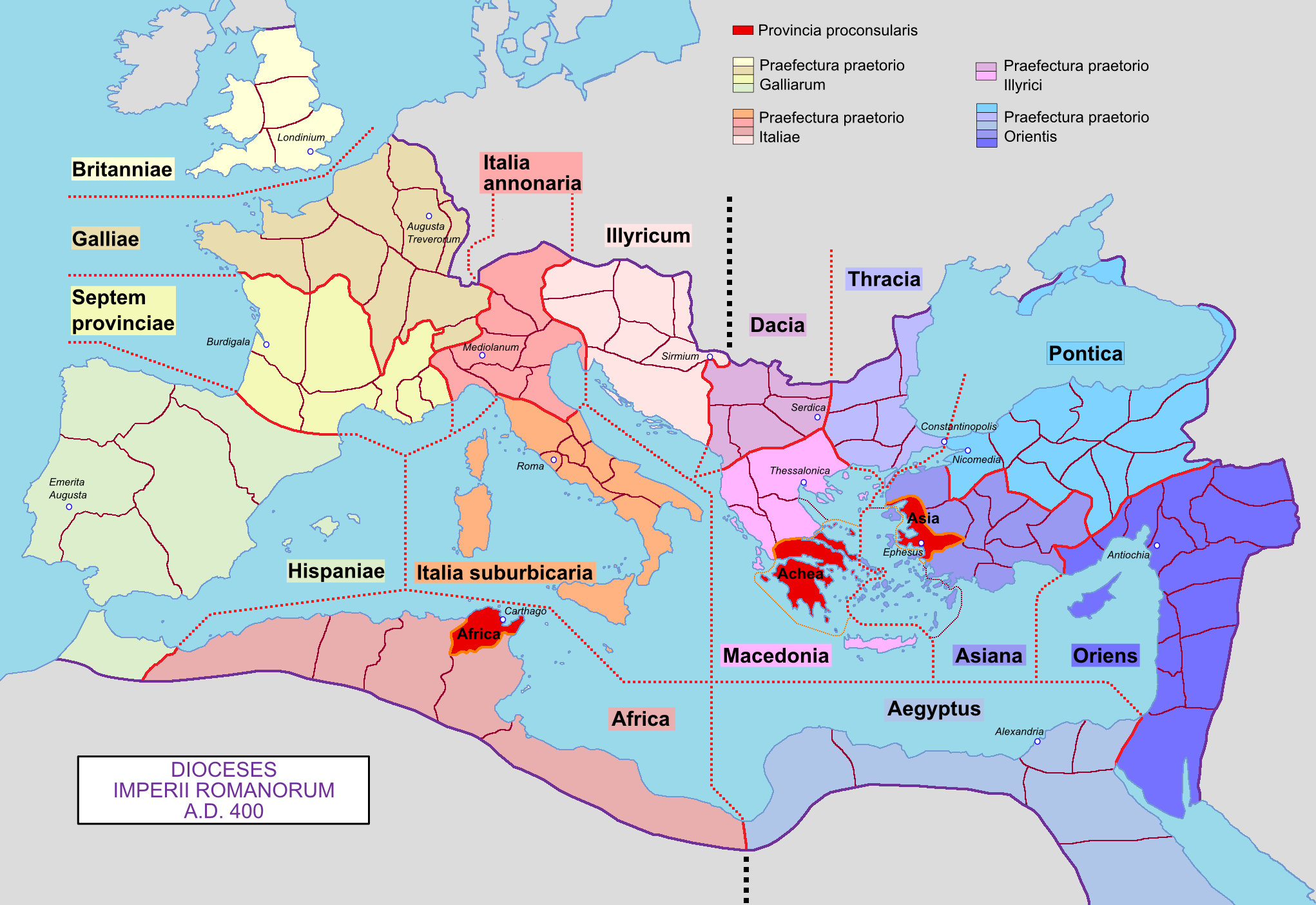
The administrative division of the empire into prefectures and dioceses. The map shows the western section of Illyricum as part of Italia, which only occurred in AD 395.

From 310, Constantine I was one of the Augusti of the Empire and from 324 he was the sole ruler of the whole state. During his reign, he carried out many crucial reforms creating the administrative and military organization of the empire which would last until the fall of the Western Roman Empire.

==== Regionalisation of the Praetorian Prefectures ====
The principal territorial reform undertaken by Constantine, as part of a process of trial-and-error, was the 'regionalisation' of the Praetorian prefecture. Hitherto, one or two Praetorian prefects had served as chief minister for the whole empire, with military, judicial, and fiscal responsibilities.

The political centralisation under Constantine, which culminated in the reunification of the whole empire under his rule, resulted in an "administrative decentralisation." A single emperor could not control everything, so between 326 and 337, Constantine progressively transformed the 'ministerial' Praetorian Prefect into a 'regional' Prefect, in charge of a specific territory which contained several dioceses and was called a 'Praetorian Prefecture' (praefectura praetorio).

These Praetorian Prefects had authority over the Vicars and Provincial Governors. Paul Petit argues that the dioceses "themselves prefigured to some degree" the regional praetorian prefectures. Thus, the creation of the praetorian prefectures reduced the utility of the dioceses. The direct link between the prefects and the governors bypassed the Vicars and caused their power to decline; they increasingly became agents carrying out the will of the Praetorian Prefects. However, despite their decreased importance, the vicars played an important role in the court hierarchy: Constantine raised them to the rank of clarissimi (between the consulares and the proconsulares).

==== Creation of the comites ====
The other reason for the weakening of the vicars was the regular dispatch of comites, who outranked the vicars and probably had the role of inspecting their conduct.

==== Territorial adjustments ====
It was probably Constantine in 312 who transformed the agens vices prefectorum praetorio of Rome, which had been the commander of the troops stationed in the City when the Praetorian Prefect was absent since the Severan period, into the civil vicar of Italia Suburbicaria, as part of his demilitarisation of the city after his victory over Maxentius. Thus, under Constantine, the diocese of Italia was split into the two vicariates of Italia Suburbicaria in the south and Italia Annonaria in the north, under the administration of the vicarius urbis Romae and the vicarius Italiae respectively. Italia Suburbicaria and Italia Annonaria were not de jure dioceses, but vicariates within a single Italian diocese, as the Laterculus Veronensis and the Notitia Dignitatum show. Constantine I also divided the diocese of Moesia into the dioceses of Dacia and Macedonia in 327.

Under Emperor Valens (364–378), the Diocese of Egypt was split out of the Diocese of the East. The Notitia Dignitatum indicates that at some point, the Diocese of Gaul was suppressed and incorporated into the diocese of the Septem Provinciae.

According to the Notitia Dignitatum, the dioceses of Dacia and Illyricum did not have vicars, but were governed by the Praetorian Prefect of Illyricum directly. Before its suppression, the Diocese of Gaul also seems to have been directly administered by the Praetorian Prefect of Gaul. In fact, according to Jones, the diocese in which each Praetorian Prefect was based was generally under their direct control, except for the Diocese of Thrace, which was administered by a vicarius Thraciarum even though the Praetorian Prefect of the East had his seat in the diocese. The title of vicar was used in all provinces except for the Diocese of the East, which was governed by a comes Orientis and Egypt, which continued to be governed by a Prefect but was in effect a vicar.

=== Subsequent evolution ===
The successors of Theodosius I made few changes to the administrative subdivisions of the Empire. A few provinces were further subdivided. For example, the provinces of Epirus, Galatia, Palestina, and Thebais were split in two. At the beginning of the 6th century, the province of Aegyptus was also split in two. A separate Vicariate of the Long Walls was created in Thrace by Anastasius I (491–518).

==== Fall of the Western Roman empire ====
Around the end of the 5th century, the majority of the dioceses of the Western Roman Empire ceased to exist, following the establishment of the Barbarian kingdoms. There is no evidence that the Franks and Burgundians maintained the Roman provincial system; the Visigoths and Vandals did maintain the provinces (governed by rectores or iudices), but not the dioceses or prefectures. In Italia, Odoacer and then the Ostrogothic kings, particularly Theoderic, basically retained the Roman provincial system, including the Praetorian Prefecture of Italia and the two vicariates of Italia Annonaria and Italia Suburbicaria, as well as the various provinces that they contained. When Theoderic conquered Provence in 508, he also re-established a Diocese of the Gauls, which was promoted to the rank of Prefecture with a capital at Arelate two years later. This Praetorian Prefecture was abolished in 536, during the reign of Vitiges, after the cession of Provence to the Franks. The rationale behind Odoacer and Theoderic's maintenance of the Roman provincial system was that they were officially viceroys of the Roman emperor in Constantinople, for whom Italia nominally continued to form part of the Roman empire. The civilian offices, including the vicars, praesides, and Praetorian Prefects, continued to be filled with Roman citizens, while Barbarians without citizenship were barred from holding them. According to Cassiodorus, however, the authority of the vicarius urbis Romae was diminished: in the 4th century, he no longer controlled the ten provinces of Italia Suburbicaria, but only the land within forty miles of the City of Rome.

==== Justinian's reforms ====
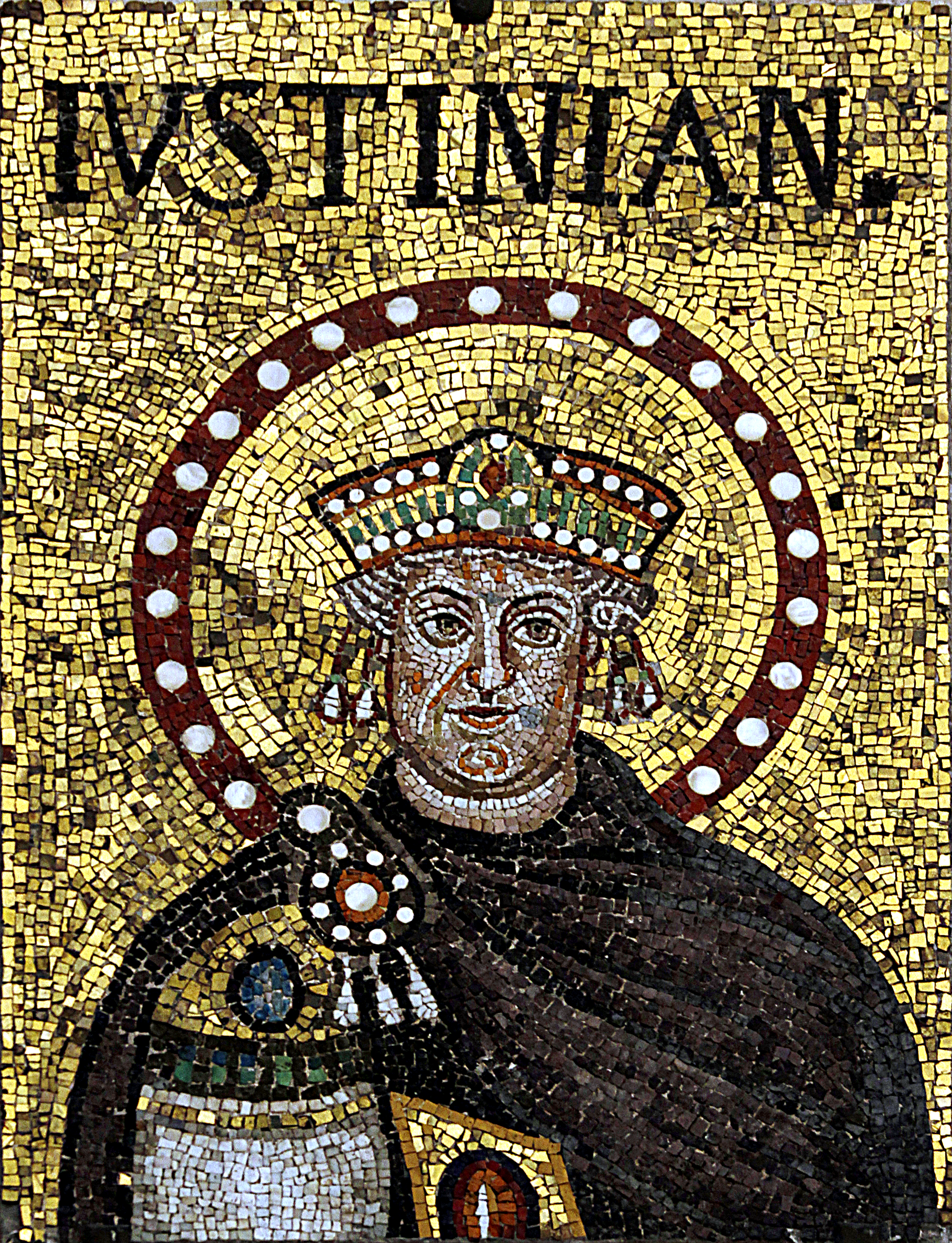
Mosaic from the Basilica of Sant'Apollinare Nuovo, depicting Justinian

In 535–536, Justinian decided to abolish the dioceses of the East, Asia, and Pontus; their vicars were demoted to simple provincial governors. For example, the comes Orientis (count of the East) became the title of the governor of Syria I, while the vicars of Asia and Pontus became governors of Phrygia Pacatiana and Galatia I respectively, with the title of Comes Iustinianus and civilian and military powers. In May 535, Justinian abolished the vicariates of Thrace and the Long Walls, in order to improve the defence of the Long Walls by ending the continuous conflicts between the two vicars. He entrusted the administration of the diocese of Thrace to a praetor Iustinianus with civilian and military powers. A year later, in order to improve the efficiency of provisioning troops garrisoned in Thrace, a new prefecture was introduced, the Prefecture of the Islands, which was governed by a quaestor exercitus (Quaestor of the army) based in Odessus (present-day Varna). This prefecture contained the provinces of Moesia II, Scythia Minor, Insulae (the Cyclades), Caria, and Cyprus. In 539, Justinian also abolished the diocese of Egypt, splitting it into five independent circumscriptions (groups of provinces) governed by duces with civilian and military authority, who were direct subordinates of the Praetorian prefect of the East. The Prefect of Egypt, formerly in charge of the whole diocese, was renamed the dux augustalis, and left with control over only the provinces of Aegyptus I and Aegyptus II. Essentially, the modifications to the provincial system carried out by Justinian were motivated by the desire to end the conflict between civilian and military officials, and thus moved away from Diocletian's principle of completely separating civilian and military power. In this, according to J. B. Bury, Justinian anticipated the introduction of the themes in the 7th century. Moreover, by abolishing the dioceses, Justinian attempted to simplify the bureaucracy and simultaneously decrease the state's expenses, noting that the vicars had become superfluous, since their courts of appeal were used ever less frequently and the provincial governors could be directly controlled by the Praetorian Prefect, by means of the so-called tractatores.

Some of Justinian's decisions were subsequently revisited. In fact, thirteen years after the reforms of 535, in 548, Justinian decided to re-establish the diocese of Pontus due to serious internal problems. The vicar of Pontus was also given military powers, in order to effectively oppose the brigands that infested the region. In the same period, five provinces of the former diocese of Asia which had become infested with brigands (Lycaonia, Pisidia, Lydia, and the two Phrygiae), were placed under the jurisdiction of a biocolytes (preventor of violence), in order to maintain order in the region. The jurisdiction of this official was reduced to just Lycaonia and Lydia in 553, since the other three provinces had been pacified. Novel 157 of AD 542, concerning Osroene and Mesopotamia is addressed to the Comes Orientis, suggesting that the northern part of the former diocese of the East remained under the authority of the Comes Orientis in this period. Furthermore, it seems from the fact that a Vicar of Thrace is again attested in 576, it also seems that the diocese of Thrace was revived at some point – perhaps under Justinian.

When Africa and Italia were reconquered, Justinian established Praetorian prefecture of Africa, while the Praetorian Prefecture of Italia returned to Imperial hands after the Gothic War. The whole territory of the Empire in Africa, which had been the Diocese of Africa in the 4th and 5th centuries, was thus promoted to the rank of Prefecture which proves vicars were mini-prefects but different in that they were executive officers whereas prefects could make policy decisions. It was not divided into dioceses. It is unlikely that the Praetorian Prefecture of Italia was subdivided into two vicariates again in the Byzantine period. The authority of the two Italian vicars was definitely much reduced compared to the 5th century.

The successors of Justinian continued his policy of concentrating civilian and military power in the hands of a single individual. Maurice (582–602) transformed the old Prefectures of Italia and Africa into Exarchates governed by an Exarch, who held both civilian and military authority. The vicars and other civilian officials seem to have lost most of their importance to the exarchs and their subordinates, but did not disappear until the middle of the 7th century AD. After 557, there is no record of vicarii in Italia, but two agentes vices of the Praetorian Prefect of Italia with their seats in Genova and Rome are mentioned in Pope Gregory I's letters. (Note: As noted above, agentes vices praefectorum praetorio was a synonym of vicarii. The vicar based at Milan might have fled to Genova following the Lombard conquest.) These Italian agentes vices are no longer attested after the first half of the seventh century.

==== Disappearance ====
In the seventh century, as a result of the establishment of the first themes (military districts governed by a strategos with military and civilian authority) and the invasions of the Arabs and Slavs, the Praetorian Prefectures of the East and of Illyricum disappeared. The last certain attestation of a Praetorian Prefect of the East is in 629, while Illyricum survived to the end of the 7th century, but without any effective power since the majority of the Balkans, aside from Thessaloniki, had fallen under the Slavs. Thus the Prefect of Illyricum was renamed the Praetorian Prefect of Thessaloniki. In the same period, the dioceses of Dacia and Macedonia finally disappeared as a result of the loss of almost all their territory. However, the Taktikon Uspenskij which was written at the beginning of the 9th century, mentions a Praetorian Prefect of Constantinople and Proconsuls (anthypatoi) of the themes, which suggests that the Praetorian Prefecture of the East continued to exist even though it had lost most of its earlier powers and had only a few judicial functions. If the dioceses lost their fiscal functions during the 6th and 7th centuries, it may be that they were replaced by new groupings of provinces under the judicial administration of a Proconsul (anthypatos). The provinces continued to exist under the themes until the second half of the 9th century.

== Organisation ==
=== Vicars ===
The vicarius was a high official appointed by the Emperor and accountable only to him. The position was held by equites who were given the rank of perfectissimus (before the egregii and after the eminentissimi). Thus, in rank, the vicars were inferior to the governors of the senatorial provinces (the consulares), although they had to exercise political authority over them. René Rémond suggests that this paradox was resolved by promoting vicars whose dioceses contained provinces with senatorial governors to the rank of clarissimus, but there is no evidence for this. Constantine the Great raised them to the senatorial rank of clarissimus in 324–325.

Initially, the powers of the vicars were considerable: they controlled and monitored the governors (aside from the proconsuls who governed Asia and Africa), administered the collection of taxes, intervened in military affairs in order to fortify the borders, and judged appeals. They were not under the control of the Praetorian Prefect, but only to the Emperor himself. Appeals of their legal decisions went straight to the emperor. In as much as they were responsible for the integrity of the global diocesan budgets drawn up by the prefectures, they were in 328–329 AD given oversight powers and appeal authority over the Treasury and Crown Estate officials but could not meddle in their routine business. The offices of the three regional ministries were located in the same towns or cities: this facilitated the work of the diocesan staffs which was to audit and process the huge amounts of fiscal and judicial work from the provincial level before being sent to the prefectures. He was tasked with regulating and controlling governors; exacting compliance from any officials he had partial or whole authority over in cooperation with the regional officials of the respective jurisdictions; processing huge amounts of judicial and fiscal information before being sent up prefecture. The additional authority truly made vicars mini-prefects. The position went into decline from the first decades of the 5th century as the emperors switched back to the two tier prefect-governor arrangement rather than the 3 level with the diocese as regional level as fiscal officials for central headquarters became stationed in the provinces and the change over to the great bulk of tax collection in gold simplified the amount of paperwork and transport needs.

The vicars had no real military role and had no troops under their command, which was a significant novelty compared to the Augustan provincial system. The intent was to separate military and civilian power, thereby preventing rebellions and civil wars, and making the military subject to civilian command. They, the prefects and the governors, were in control of the logistical support system of the military: provisioning, maintenance, installation planning and construction funding.

== See also ==
- Classical antiquity
- Late Antiquity
- List of Late Roman provinces
- Local government (ancient Roman)
