= Roman governor =

Position

A Roman governor was an official either elected or appointed to be the chief administrator of Roman law throughout one or more of the many provinces constituting the Roman Empire.

The generic term in Roman legal language was rector provinciae, regardless of the specific titles, which also reflects the province's intrinsic and strategic status, and corresponding differences in authority.

By the time of the early Empire, two types of provinces existed—senatorial and imperial—and several types of governor would emerge. Only proconsuls and propraetors fell under the classification of promagistrate.

== Duties of the governor ==
The governor was the province's chief judge. He had the sole right to impose capital punishment, and capital cases were normally tried before him. To appeal a governor's decision necessitated travelling to Rome and presenting one's case before either the praetor urbanus, or even the Emperor himself, an expensive, and thus rare, process. An appeal was unlikely to succeed anyway, as a governor wouldn't generally take the chance of convicting someone contrary to the Emperor's wishes. The governor was also supposed to travel across his province to administer justice in the major towns where his attention was required.

Finally, and most importantly, he commanded the military forces within the province. In the more important provinces, this could consist of legions, but elsewhere, there were only auxiliaries. As a part of his standing orders, the governor had the authority to use his legions to stamp out organized criminal gangs or rebels in the area without need for the Emperor's or Senate's approval.

Every governor had at his disposal a diversity of advisors and staff, who were known as his comites (Latin for "companions"); the number of these depended on the governor's social standing and rank. These comites would serve as the governor's executive council, with each supervising a different aspect of the province, and assisting the governor in decision making. In the provinces with a significant legionary presence, the governor's second-in-command was usually a quaestor, a man elected in Rome and sent to the province to serve a mainly financial role, but who could command the military with the governor's approval. In other provinces governors themselves appointed non-magistrate prefects or procurators to govern a small part of the province and act as their second-in-command.

== Republican governors ==
During the era of the Roman Republic, the council was in charge of appointing governors to Rome's provinces. This was done by appointing promagistrates to serve, either by random casting of lots or by senatus consultum (advice of the Senate); however, these appointments were not formally binding on a legal basis and could be nullified by Roman assemblies.

Initially, a governor or general's title – pro praetore or pro consule - was determined by the last held previous urban magistracy: that is, former praetors were prorogued in place of a praetor (pro praetore) and former consuls were pro consule. This system, however, started to break down after private citizens were given commands in Spain pro consule during the Second Punic War. By the late republic, praetors were almost always prorogued pro consule. However, the provinces that ex-praetors were assigned – regardless of formal title – were usually the more tranquil ones, where chances of revolt or invasion were small. Provinces where imminent military campaigning was expected were instead assigned to recent consuls.

These promagistrates held equality with other magistrates with the same level of imperium and were attended by the same number of lictors. Generally speaking, they had autocratic power within their provinces. A provincial governor almost possessed unlimited authority and often extorted vast amounts of money from the provincial population—but, though he retained immunity from prosecution as long as he held his imperium, once he left office he became vulnerable to prosecution for his actions during his term.

== Imperial governors ==
=== Imperial provinces ===
After Augustus established the Principate, the Emperor himself was the direct governor of Rome's most important provinces (called imperial provinces) and even in the provinces he did not directly govern, was senior to other provincial governors through holding imperium maius, or supreme imperium. In imperial provinces, the Emperor would appoint legates to govern in his name. The Emperor had sole say in the appointing of these legates, who were lower in rank than other provincial governors, as officially they were only representatives of the province's true governor, the Emperor.

The Principate did not totally do away with the system of selecting proconsuls and propraetors. In provinces with one legion, a legate bearing praetorian imperium, thus being a propraetor, not only governed the province in the Emperor's name but also controlled the legion himself. However, in provinces with more than one legion, each legion was commanded by its own legate with praetorian imperium, while the province as a whole was commanded by a legate with consular imperium, who had general command over the entire army stationed there, as well as administering the province as a proconsul.

Appointment to these governorships was completely at the whim of the Emperor and could last anywhere from one to five years.

=== Senatorial provinces ===
While the Emperor had sole authority in provinces with legions, senatorial provinces were provinces where the Senate had the right to appoint governors. These provinces were away from the Empire's borders and free from the likelihood of rebellion, and so had few, if any, legions stationed in them (thus lessening the chance the Senate might try to seize power from the Emperor).

These provinces were under the authority of proconsular or propraetorian senators invariably styled 'proconsul', with little need for intervention by the Emperor (although the Emperor had the power to appoint these governors if he wished). Most senatorial provinces, since they were not under the direct authority of the Emperor, did not grant the governor legions to command. There was one exception to this rule, the province of Africa, where there was always at least a single legion to protect the province from Berber tribes.

Augustus decreed that at least ten provinces would be held by the authority of the Roman people through the agency of the Senate. Though all ten were "proconsular", only two of these provinces (Asia and Africa), were actually governed by senators with proconsular imperium, the remaining eight being governed by propraetors. The two proconsular governors served for one year, while the eight praetors served typically for up to three years. Each of these men had six lictors who served as bodyguards and also as a symbol of authority and a mark of their position.

=== Equestrian procurator ===
The Emperor also had under his control a number of smaller, but potentially difficult provinces that did not need an entire legion. These provinces were put under the control of governors of equestrian status. New conquests generally fell into this equestrian category, but most were later changed in status to reflect the changing conditions of Rome's growing empire. Thus, on conquest, a province would become a procuratorial province until it was decided that it should become either an imperial or senatorial province and thus governed by either a propraetor or proconsul. Like the other imperial provinces, the equestrian governors could serve any length of time up to five years, or even longer.

Much like the senatorial province of Africa, the equestrian province of Roman Egypt was an exception to the general rule of legions only being stationed in imperial provinces. Egypt was not a normal province; it was considered the personal possession of the Emperor, and its governor, the praefectus Aegypti, was considered the hold the highest ranking equestrian post during the early Empire. Later, the post would fall second to that of the praetorian command, but its position remained highly prestigious.

Though the practice of appointing equestrians to help manage provinces officially began with Augustus, governors from years before had appointed procurators to help them govern. However, it was not until the reign of Claudius that these procurators received the powers of a governor. Procurators were civilian officials, unlike prefects. Procurators were not magistrates, so did not possess imperium, and merely exercised the Emperor's, or governor's, authority with his approval.

== Late imperial governors ==
The provincial governors were the most important officials in the Roman administration for it was they who were responsible for tax collection, justice in the first instance, and public order in the first instance. They received, from the prefectures, the tax demands three times a year, which they circulated to the municipalities.

Under the Dominate, the Emperor Diocletian began in AD 293 reforms of the provincial administration that were completed under the Emperor Constantine the Great in 318. Diocletian set up twelve dioceses (later several were split), originally two to four for each of the four co-emperors under the short-lived Tetrarchy (two senior Augusti, each above a Caesar), each governed by a vicarius ('vicar') who acted on behalf of the praetorian prefect. Each diocese comprised several Roman provinces (known in Greek as eparchies), each under the authority of a provincial governor, whose title varied from province to province (the range of titles includes republican relics such as proconsul, as well as novelties such as corrector provinciae, moderator provinciae, praeses provinciae and praesidens). Although the vicar's authority was supreme within his diocese, he was under the authority of praetorian prefect whose power he partook of the emperor himself.

Constantine completely removed the governors' military commands, a process begun under Diocletian. In those provinces where soldiers were stationed, the dux (Latin for leader) commanded border military units. Some duces commanded units in several provinces: they were watched by the diocesan vicars. Field units were commanded by a comes ('companion', whence count) and later by supreme military commanders, the magistri militum.

Constantine, again following Diocletian's lead, organized the Roman Empire into three Praetorian prefectures late in his reign. These were based on the territories controlled by the four co-emperors of the Tetrarchy, two of whom, the senior Augusti, had been served by a praetorian prefect as something like a chief of staff. The three prefectures thus created were the prefecture of Gaul, the prefecture of Italy (later divided by Constans in 347 or perhaps in 342–47), and the prefecture of the East, each being administered by an imperially-appointed praetorian prefect. The prefect of each prefecture was the highest civilian officer, being subordinate only to the emperor(s). The prefect was the superior of the vicars and governors. He was the chief appellate judge, head of the administration of the prefecture, chief finance officer, and chief tax collector (though the collection was actually done at municipal and village levels).

- A list of the provinces within the dioceses and the dioceses within the prefectures can be found on the Roman provinces page.

== See also ==
- Lists of ancient Roman governors
- Promagistrate
- Legatus Augusti pro praetore

== Bibliography ==
- Drogula, Fred (2015). Commanders & command in the Roman republic and early empire. Chapel Hill: University of North Carolina Press. ISBN 978-1-4696-2314-6. OCLC 905949529.
