= Praetorian prefecture =

Administrative division of the late Roman Empire

The praetorian prefecture (Latin: praefectura praetorio; in Greek variously named ἐπαρχότης τῶν πραιτωρίων or ὑπαρχία τῶν πραιτωρίων) was the largest administrative division of the late Roman Empire, above the mid-level dioceses and the low-level provinces. Praetorian prefectures originated in the reign of Constantine I (r. 306–337), reaching their more or less final form in the last third of the 4th century and surviving until the 7th century, when the reforms of Heraclius diminished the prefecture's power, and the Muslim conquests forced the Eastern Roman Empire to adopt the new theme system. Elements of the prefecture's administrative apparatus, however, are documented to have survived in the Byzantine Empire until the first half of the 9th century.

== History ==
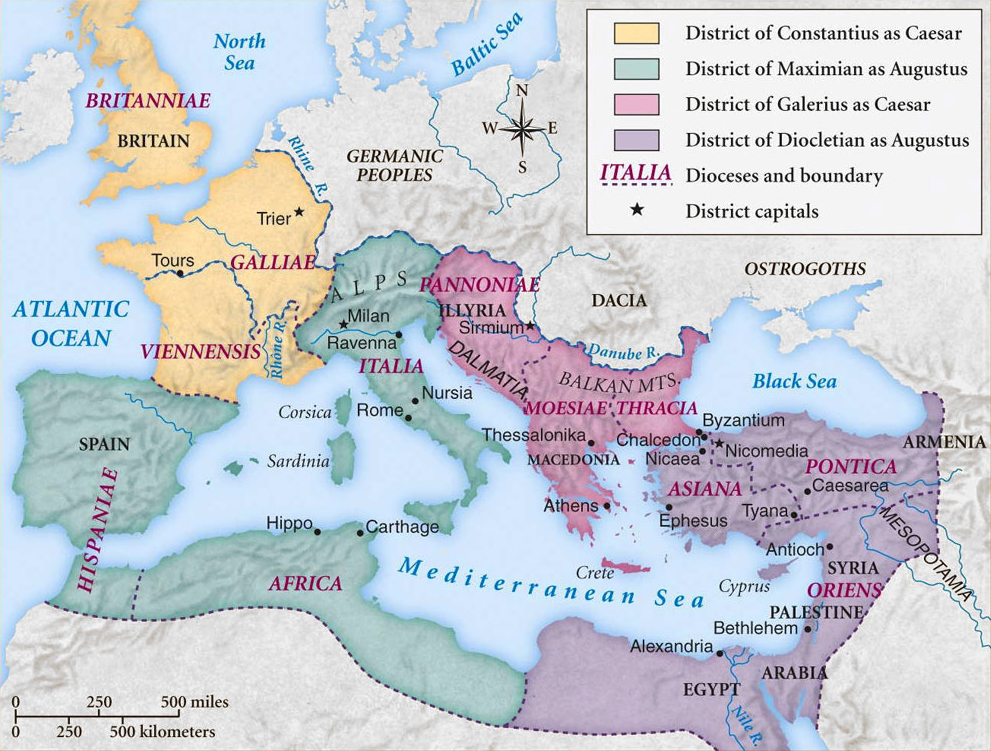
Map of the Roman Empire under the Tetrarchy, showing the dioceses and the four tetrarchs' zones of control.

The office of the praetorian prefect had a long history dating back to the origins of the Roman Empire: initially, its two holders were the commanders of the Praetorian Guard, but gradually, they became the emperor's chief aides, and amassed considerable administrative and judicial responsibilities. The exact process of transformation to the chief civilian administrator of a specific territorial circumscription is still unclear. A common misconception, based on Zosimus, is that Constantine I established the praetorian prefectures as definite territorial administrations as early as 318, or in 324, after his victory over Licinius.

During the Tetrarchy, when the number of holders of the imperial office multiplied (two senior emperors, the Augusti, and two junior colleagues, the Caesares), there is evidence for the existence of only two prefects at each time, presumably assigned to each of the Augusti. At that stage, the prefect's power was still immense. In the words of A.H.M. Jones, he was "a kind of grand vizier, the emperor's second in command, wielding a wide authority in almost every sphere of government, military and judicial, financial and general administration. He was the emperor’s chief of staff, adjutant-general, and quartermaster-general...". Following Diocletian's abdication in 305, civil war erupted among the various co-emperors, during which time each of the contenders appointed his own prefect, a pattern carried on during the period where the Empire was shared between Licinius and Constantine I. In 317 a third prefect was added in Gaul for Constantine's son Crispus. After his execution in 326 this prefect was retained. Thus, from 317 onwards, there were never less than three, and for years 347–361, 374–379 and 388–391, four, with the addition of a Praetorian prefecture of Illyricum, although in the last two years it comprised only the dioceses of Dacia and Macedonia which would be the permanent territory from then on after restoration in 395.

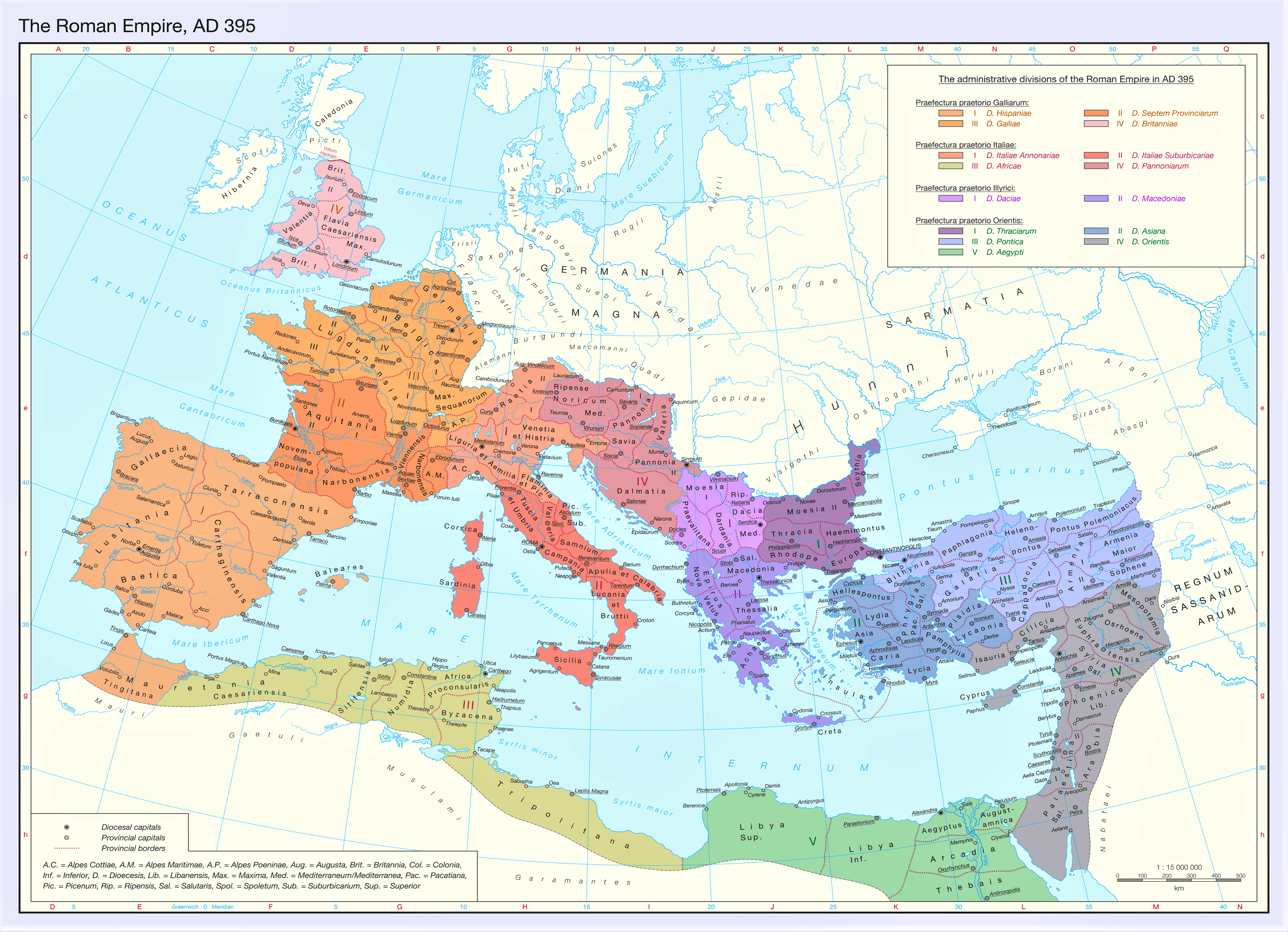
The administrative divisions of the Roman Empire in 395 AD

Following Constantine's victory over Licinius and the unification of the Empire under his rule, the office was transformed. The prefect's military duties were removed by the creation of the purely military offices of the magister peditum and magister equitum ("Master of the Foot/Horse"), and the establishment of the magister officiorum as the powerful head of the palatine bureaucracy and the civil service at large provided a counterbalance to the prefect's power. These reforms were the result of both the lack of officials suitable for the prefect's wide-ranging tasks, and of the desire to reduce the potential challenge to the emperor's authority posed by the over-mighty prefect. The office of the prefect was consequently converted into a purely civilian administrative one, albeit retaining the highest position in the imperial hierarchy, immediately below the emperor himself. Another important departure from tetrarchic practice was the increase in the number of holders: no less than five prefects are attested for ca. 332. This development is likely related to Constantine's giving his four sons specific territories to administer, envisioning a partition of imperial authority among them following his death. In this, the origins of the later territorial prefectures may be detected.

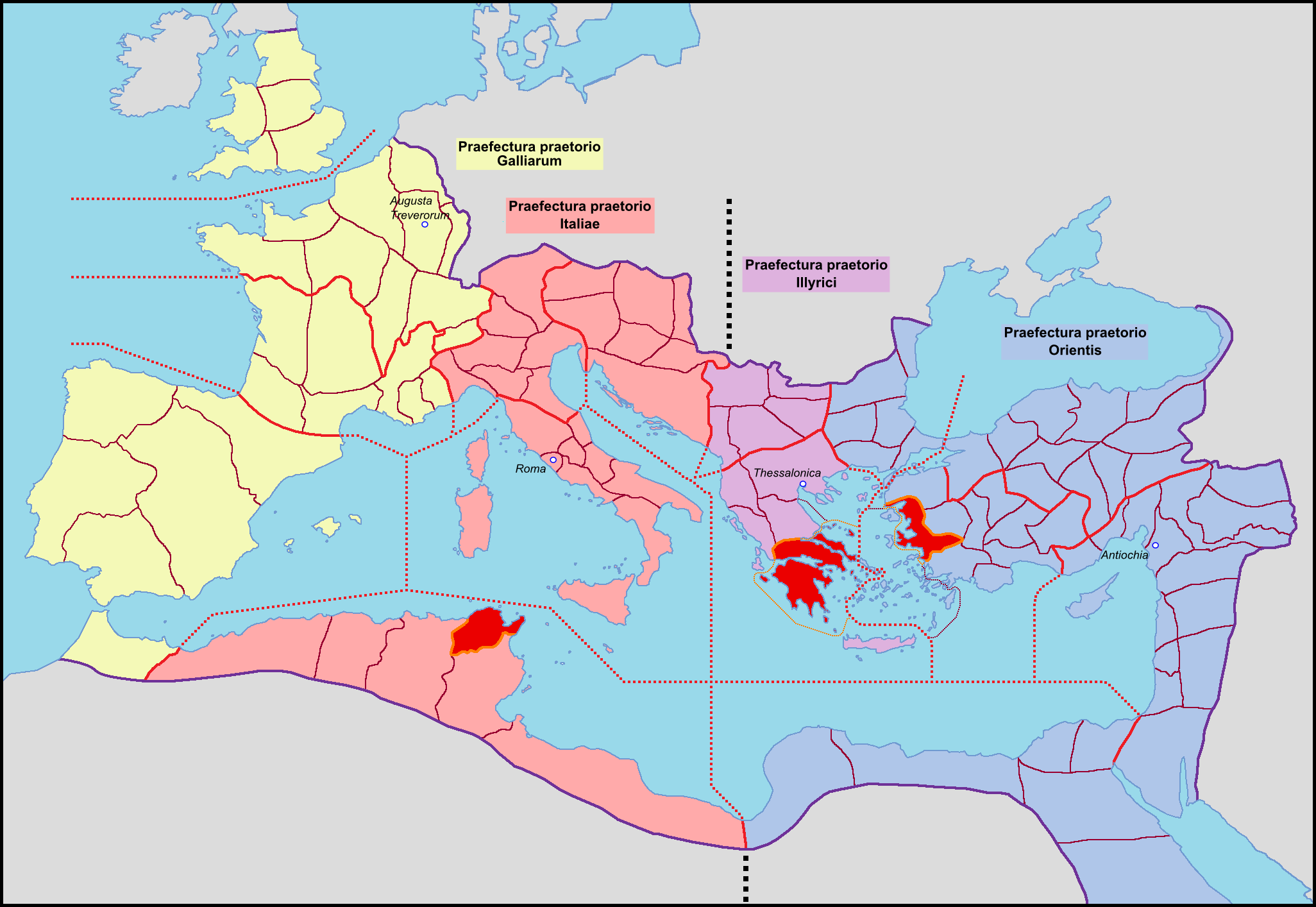
The four prefectures of the Roman Empire, as they appear in the Notitia Dignitatum, ca. 400 AD.

After Constantine's death in 337, his three surviving sons partitioned the Empire between them. As each new Augustus had his own praetorian prefect, this division created the first of what would gradually become the permanent praetorian prefectures: the western prefecture of Gaul (dioceses of Gaul, Viennensis, Hispania and Britain), the central prefecture of Italy, Illyricum and Africa (dioceses of Italy, Africa, Pannonia, Dacia and Macedonia) and the prefecture of the East (dioceses of Thrace, Asia, Pontus, Oriens). Egypt was part of the diocese of Oriens until 370 or 381. With the creation of the separate prefecture of Illyricum (dioceses of Pannonia, Dacia and Macedonia) in 347 until 361, and despite the occasional abolition of the latter, the picture that appears in the early 5th-century Notitia dignitatum ("list of dignities") was complete. The only major change was the removal of the diocese of Pannonia (renamed "Diocese of Illyricum") from the prefecture of Illyricum and its incorporation into the prefecture of Italy in 379. The diocese of Italy was in practice divided into two: of Italy in the north, and suburbicarian ("under the City") Italy in the south including Sicily, Corsica and Sardinia. There were no vicars appointed to the dioceses of Gaul and Dacia, because the praetorian prefects of Gaul and Illyricum were resident. When the prefect of Italy was in Milan, a vicar for Illyricum was appointed to reside in Sirmium; when the prefect resided in Sirmium, the post was lapsed, and a vicar was appointed to reside in Milan in place of the prefect.

In the course of the 5th century, the Western Empire was overrun by the invasions of Germanic tribes. However, the prefecture of Italy was retained by the new Ostrogothic Kingdom, which was still de jure part of the Empire, and Ostrogothic king Theodoric the Great even re-established the prefecture of Gaul in the small portion of Gaul he conquered in the 510s. After the reconquest of Northern Africa by the Eastern Empire during the Vandalic War of 533–534, the new provinces were grouped by emperor Justinian I into a new praetorian prefecture of Africa, which would later be transformed into the Exarchate of Africa. The praetorian prefecture of Italy was also re-established after the end of the Gothic War, before it too evolved into an exarchate. In the East, the prefectures would continue to function until the mid-7th century, when the loss of most eastern provinces to the Muslim conquest and of the Balkans to Slavic tribes led to the creation of the Theme system. In the meantime, however, reforms under Heraclius had stripped the prefect from a number of his subordinate financial bureaux, which were set up as independent departments under logothetes. The last time the prefect of the East is directly attested comes from a law of 629. According to some scholars, however, traces of the system survived into the early 9th century: Ernst Stein demonstrated that some aspects of the Illyrian prefecture survived in the administration of Thessalonica, while John Haldon, based on sigillographic evidence and references in the Byzantine Taktika, has documented the survival of the earlier civilian provincial administration within the theme system, with the prefect in Constantinople possibly in a supervisory capability, until the 840s.

== Authority and powers of the prefect ==
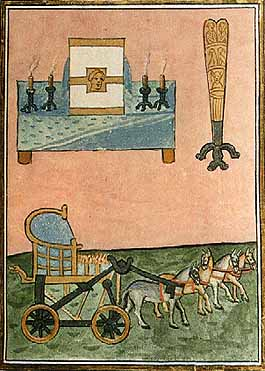
The insignia of the praetorian prefect of Illyricum, as depicted in the Notitia Dignitatum: the ivory inkwell and pen case (theca), the codicil of appointment to the office on a blue cloth-covered table, and the state carriage.

Originally, the praetorian prefects were drawn from the equestrian class. Constantine's reforms entailed the reservation of this office for members of the senatorial class, and its prestige and authority were raised to the highest level, so that contemporary writers refer to it as the "supreme office". In the divided Empire, the two senior prefects were those of the East and of Italy, residing in the courts of the two emperors and acting effectively as their first ministers, while the prefects of Illyricum and Gaul held a more junior position.

The prefects held wide-ranging control over most aspects of the administrative machinery of their provinces, and only the magister officiorum rivalled them in power. The prefects fulfilled the roles of supreme administrative and juridical official, already present from the time of Septimius Severus, and that of chief financial official, responsible for the state budget. In their capacity as judges, they had the right to pass judgment instead of the emperor (vice sacra), and, unlike lower governors, their decision could not be appealed.

Their departments were divided in two major categories: the schola excerptorum, which supervised administrative and judicial affairs, and the scriniarii, overseeing the financial sector.

== Sources ==
- Notitia dignitatum
- Bury, John Bagnell (1923). History of the Later Roman Empire, Volume I, Chapter II. Macmillan & Co., Ltd.
- Haldon, John F. (1997). Byzantium in the Seventh Century: The Transformation of a Culture. Cambridge University Press. ISBN 978-0-521-31917-1.
- Jones, A.H.M. (1964). The Later Roman Empire, 284-602: A Social, Economic, and Administrative Survey.
- Kazhdan, Alexander, ed. (1991). Oxford Dictionary of Byzantium. Oxford University Press. ISBN 978-0-19-504652-6.
- Kelly, Christopher (2006). "Bureaucracy and Government". In Lenski, Noel (ed.). The Cambridge Companion to the Age of Constantine. Cambridge University Press. ISBN 978-0-521-52157-4.
- Morrisson, Cécile, ed. (2007). Le Monde byzantin, tome 1: L'Empire romain d'Orient, 330-641 (in Greek). Athens: Polis Editions. ISBN 978-960-435-134-3.
