= Roman Italy =

Italy during the Ancient Rome era

Coordinates: 42.0000°N 12.5000°E

Italy Italia (Latin)
- 753 BC–AD 476
- Roman Empire at its greatest extent (c. 117 AD), with Italy in red and provinces in pink
- Capital: Rome: full-fledged until Diocletianic times, from then on mostly only de jure. Mediolanum and Ravenna: Imperial residences; de facto capital in the Late Empire (of the whole Empire or only the Western part)
- Common languages: Latin
- Religion: Roman polytheism, followed by Nicene- Chalcedonian Christianity
- Government: Mixed constitution
- Legislature: Senate and People of Rome
- Historical era: Ancient history
  - Established: 753 BC
  - Disestablished: AD 476

Population
  - AD 1: 4 to 10 million (estimates vary, c. 1 million in Rome)
Preceded by	Succeeded by
Prehistoric Italy	Kingdom of Italy under Odoacer

Roman Italy is the period of ancient Italian history going from the founding and rise of Rome to the decline and fall of the Western Roman Empire; the Latin name of the Italian Peninsula in this period was Italia (continued to be used in the Italian language). According to Roman mythology, Italy was the ancestral home of Aeneas, being the homeland of the Trojans progenitor, Dardanus; Aeneas, instructed by Jupiter, moved to Italy after the fall of Troy, and his descendants, Romulus and Remus, were the founders of Rome. Aside from the legendary accounts, Rome was an Italic city-state that changed its form of government from Kingdom (ruled, between 753 BC and 509 BC, by seven kings) to Republic, and then grew within the context of a peninsula dominated by the Gauls, Ligures, Veneti, Camunni and Histri in the North; the Etruscans, Latins, Falisci, Picentes, Umbri and Sabines in the Centre; and the Iapygian tribes (such as the Messapians), the Oscan tribes (such as the Samnites) and Greek colonies (such as Sybaris) in the South.

The consolidation of Italy into a single entity occurred during the Roman expansion in the peninsula, when Rome formed a permanent association with most of other the local tribes and cities; and Italy's inhabitants included Roman citizens, communities with Latin Rights, and socii. The strength of the Italian confederacy was a crucial factor in the rise of Rome, starting with the Punic and Macedonian wars between the 3rd and 2nd century BC. As Roman provinces were being established throughout the Mediterranean, Italy maintained a special status with political, religious and financial privileges. In Italy, Roman magistrates exercised the imperium domi (police power), as an alternative to the imperium militiae (military power) exercised in the provinces.

The period between the end of the 2nd century BC and the 1st century BC was turbulent, beginning with the Servile Wars, continuing with the opposition of aristocratic élite to populist reformers and leading to a Social War in the middle of Italy. However, Roman citizenship was recognized to the rest of the Italians by the end of the conflict and then extended to Cisalpine Gaul when Julius Caesar became Roman dictator. In the context of the transition from Republic to Principate, Italy swore allegiance to Augustus and was then organized in eleven regions from the Alps to the Ionian Sea with more than two centuries of stability afterward. Several emperors made notable accomplishments in this period: Claudius incorporated Britain into the Roman Empire, Vespasian subjugated the Great Revolt of Judea and reformed the financial system, Trajan conquered Dacia and defeated Parthia, and Marcus Aurelius epitomized the ideal of the philosopher king.

With the development of provincial governments and the proliferation of citizenship, Italy gradually lost its position as the empire's heartland, though it retained the ideological value as Roman homeland. The Crisis of the Third Century hit Italy particularly hard, but the Roman Empire managed to survive and reconquer breakaway regions. In 286 AD, the Emperor Diocletian moved the imperial residence associated with the western territories (the later Western Roman Empire) from Rome to Mediolanum. In 293 AD, Diocletian subdivided Italy into provinces and ended its special juridical privileges, which led to the loss of Italy's precedence over provinces. Meanwhile, the islands of Corsica, Sardinia, Sicily and Malta were added to Italy by Diocletian. The city of Rome declined as the center of power as new capitals were established outside Italy, such as Nicomedia, Sirmium, and later Constantinople. However, Italy remained the centre of the Western Roman Empire in late antiquity. Italian cities such as Mediolanum, Ravenna and Rome continued to serve as capitals for the West. The Bishop of Rome had gained importance gradually from the reign of Constantine the Great, and was given religious primacy with the Edict of Thessalonica under Theodosius I. Italy was invaded several times by the wandering Germanic peoples and fell under the control of Odoacer, when Romulus Augustus was deposed in 476 AD. Afterwards, Italy was ruled by the Ostrogoths and then briefly reconquered by the Byzantine Empire. The Lombard invasion in 568 AD would begin the fragmentation of Italy which lasted until its unification in 1861.

== Characteristics ==
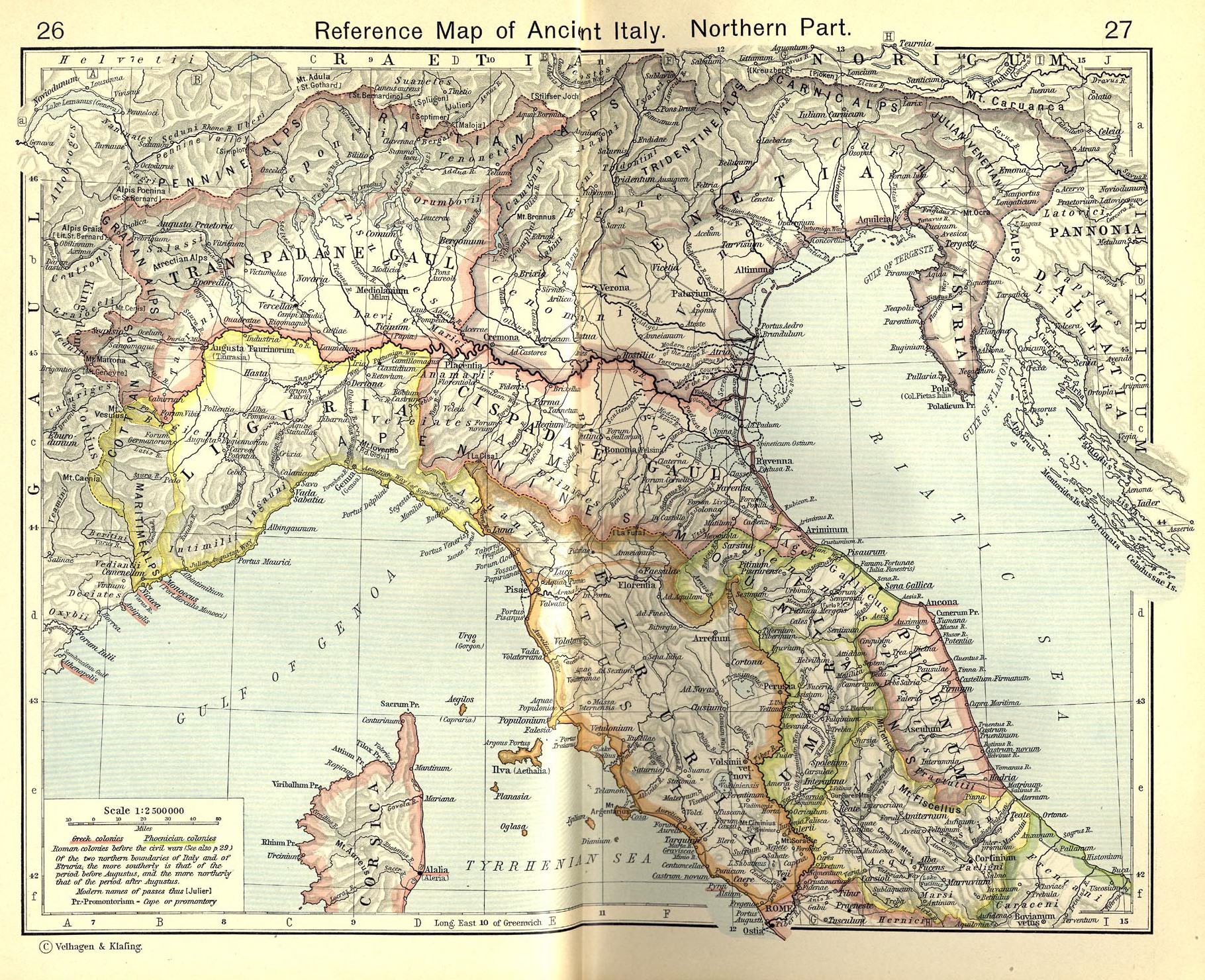

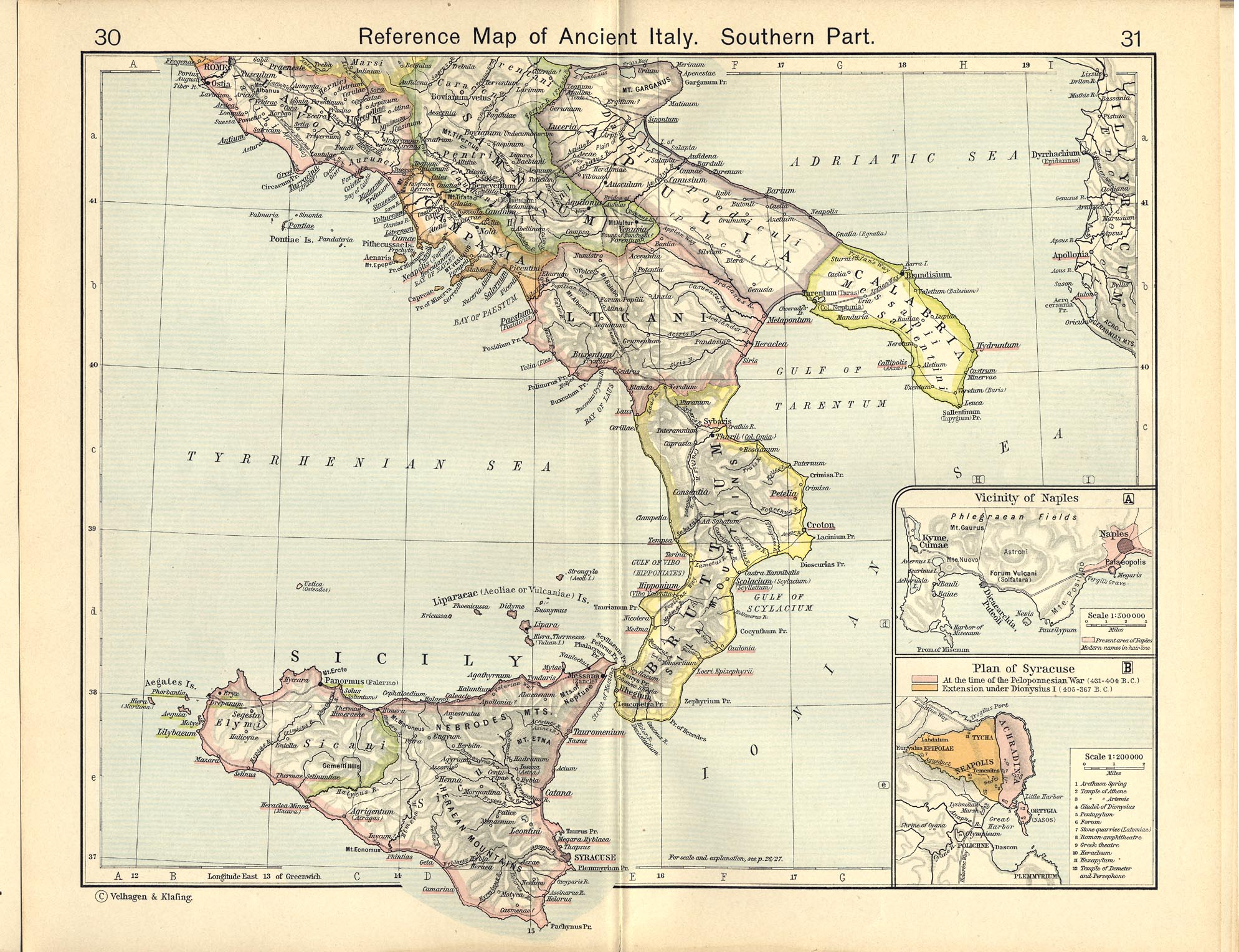
Northern and southern section of Italia under Augustus and successors

Following the end of the Social War in 87 BC, Rome had allowed its fellow Italian allies full rights in Roman society and granted Roman citizenship to all fellow Italic peoples. After having been for centuries the heart of the Roman Empire, from the 3rd century the government and the cultural center began to move eastward: first the Edict of Caracalla in 212 AD, extended Roman citizenship to all free men within the Imperial boundaries. Christianity then began to establish itself as the dominant religion from Constantine's reign (306–337), raising the power of Eastern metropolises, later grouped into Pentarchy.

Although not founded as a capital city in 330, Constantinople grew in importance. It finally gained the rank of eastern capital when given an praefectus urbi in 359 and the senators who were clari became senators of the lowest rank as clarissimi. As a result, Italy began to decline in favour of the provinces, which resulted in the division of the Empire into two administrative units in 395: the Western Roman Empire, with its capital at Mediolanum (now Milan), and the Eastern Roman Empire, with its capital at Constantinople (now Istanbul). In 402, the Imperial residence was moved to Ravenna from Milan, confirming the decline of the city of Rome (which was sacked in 410 for the first time in almost eight centuries).

== History ==
The name Italia covered an area whose borders evolved over time. According to Strabo's Geographica, before the expansion of the Roman Republic, the name was used by Greeks to indicate the land between the strait of Messina and the line connecting the gulf of Salerno and gulf of Taranto (corresponding roughly to the current region of Calabria); later the term was extended by Romans to include the Italian Peninsula up to the Rubicon, a river located between Northern and Central Italy.

In 49 BC, with the Lex Roscia, Julius Caesar gave Roman citizenship to the people of the Cisalpine Gaul; while in 42 BC the hitherto existing province was abolished, thus extending Italy to the north up to the southern foot of the Alps. Under Augustus, the peoples of today's Aosta Valley and of the western and northern Alps were subjugated (so the western border of Roman Italy was moved to the Varus river), and the Italian eastern border was brought to the Arsia in Istria. Lastly, in the late 3rd century, Italy came to also include the islands of Sicily, Corsica and Sardinia, as well as Raetia and part of Pannonia. The city of Emona (modern Ljubljana, Slovenia) was the easternmost town of Italy.

=== Augustan organization ===
At the beginning of the Roman Imperial era, Italy was a collection of territories with different political statuses. Some cities, called municipia, had some independence from Rome, while others, the coloniae, were founded by the Romans themselves. Around 7 BC, Augustus divided Italy into eleven regiones, as reported by Pliny the Elder in his Naturalis Historia:

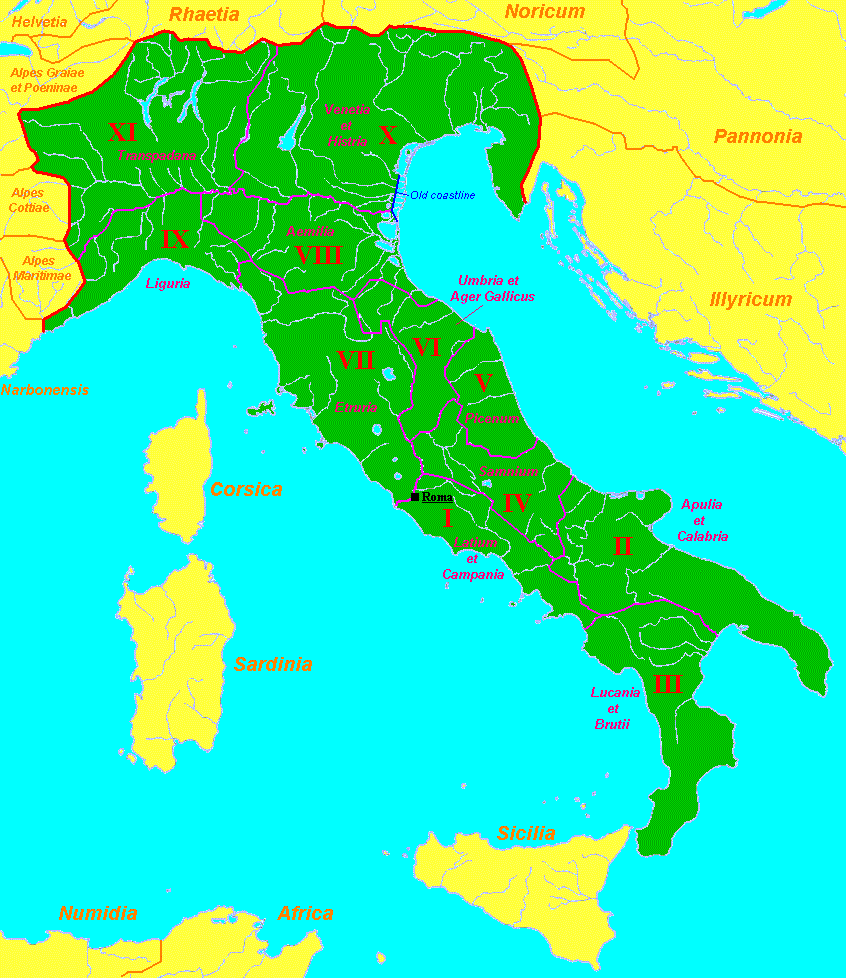
Roman Italia (in green) as organized by Augustus

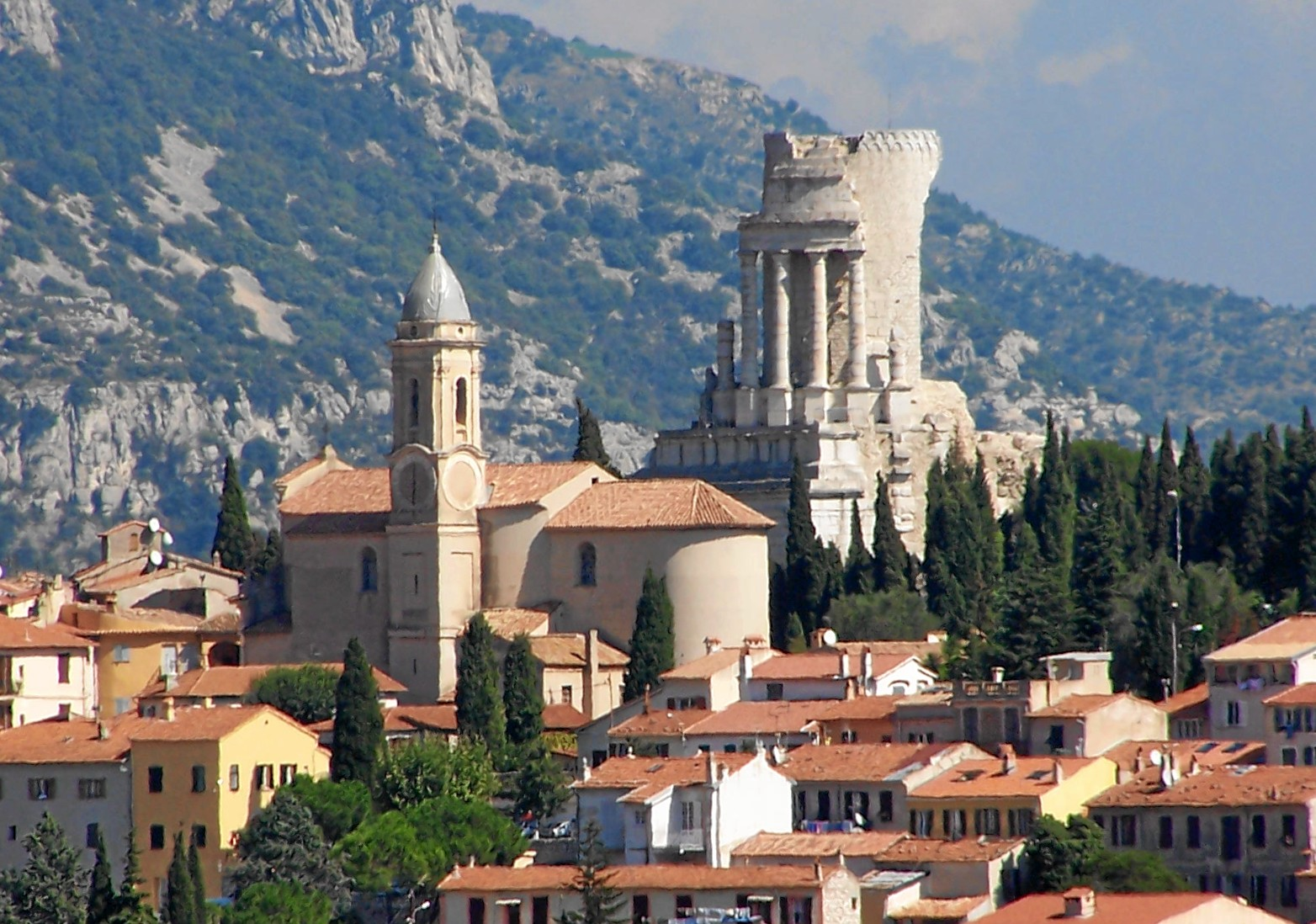
The Tropaeum Alpium, The Victory Monument of the Alps, La Turbie, France, marked the Augustan border between Italy and Gaul.

- Regio I Latium et Campania
- Regio II Apulia et Calabria
- Regio III Lucania et Bruttium
- Regio IV Samnium
- Regio V Picenum
- Regio VI Umbria et Ager Gallicus
- Regio VII Etruria
- Regio VIII Aemilia
- Regio IX Liguria
- Regio X Venetia et Histria
- Regio XI Transpadana

Italy was privileged by Augustus and his heirs, with the construction, among other public structures, of a dense network of Roman roads. The Italian economy flourished: agriculture, handicraft and industry had noticeable growth, allowing the export of goods to the provinces. The Italian population may have grown as well: three censuses were ordered by Augustus, in his role as Roman censor, in order to record the number of Roman citizens throughout the empire. The surviving totals were 4,063,000 in 28 BC, 4,233,000 in 8 BC, and 4,937,000 in AD 14, but it is still debated whether these counted all citizens, all adult male citizens, or citizens sui iuris. Estimates for the population of mainland Italy, including Cisalpine Gaul, at the beginning of the 1st century range from 6,000,000 according to Karl Julius Beloch in 1886, to 14,000,000 according to Elio Lo Cascio in 2009.

=== Diocletianic and Constantinian reorganizations ===
During the Crisis of the Third Century, the Roman Empire was on the verge of disintegration under the combined pressures of invasions, military anarchy, civil wars, and hyperinflation. In 284, Emperor Diocletian restored political stability. He carried out thorough administrative reforms to maintain order. He created the so-called Tetrarchy whereby the empire was ruled by two senior emperors called Augusti and two junior vice-emperors called Caesars. He decreased the size of the Roman provinces by doubling their number to reduce the power of the provincial governors. He grouped the provinces into several dioceses (Latin: diocesis) and put them under the supervision of the Imperial vicarius (vice, deputy), who was the head of the diocese. During the Crisis of the Third Century the importance of Rome declined because the city was far from the troubled frontiers. Diocletian and his colleagues usually resided in four Imperial seats. The Augusti, Diocletian and Maximian, who were responsible for the East and West respectively, established themselves at Nicomedia, in north-western Anatolia (closer to the Persian frontier in the east) and Milan, in northern Italy (closer to the European frontiers) respectively. The seats of the Caesars were Augusta Treverorum (on the River Rhine frontier) for Constantius Chlorus and Sirmium (on the River Danube frontier) for Galerius, who also resided at Thessalonica.

Under Diocletian Italy became the Dioecesis Italiciana. It included Raetia. It was subdivided into the following provinces:

- Liguria (today's Liguria and western Piedmont)
- Transpadana (eastern Piedmont and Lombardy(except Provincia di Brescia))
- Rhaetia (eastern Switzerland, western and central Austria, part of southern Germany, and part of northeastern Italy)
- Venetia et Histria (today's Provincia di Brescia in Lombardy, Veneto, Friuli-Venezia Giulia and Trentino-Alto Adige and Istria county)
- Aemilia (Emilia-Romagna)
- Tuscia (Etruria) et Umbria (Tuscany and Umbria)
- Flaminia (Picenum and the former Ager Gallicus, in today's Marche)
- Latium et Campania (the coastal parts of Lazio and Campania)
- Samnium (Abruzzo, Molise and Irpinia)
- Apulia et Calabria (today's Apulia)
- Lucania et Bruttium (Basilicata and Calabria)
- Sicilia (Sicily and Malta)
- Corsica et Sardinia

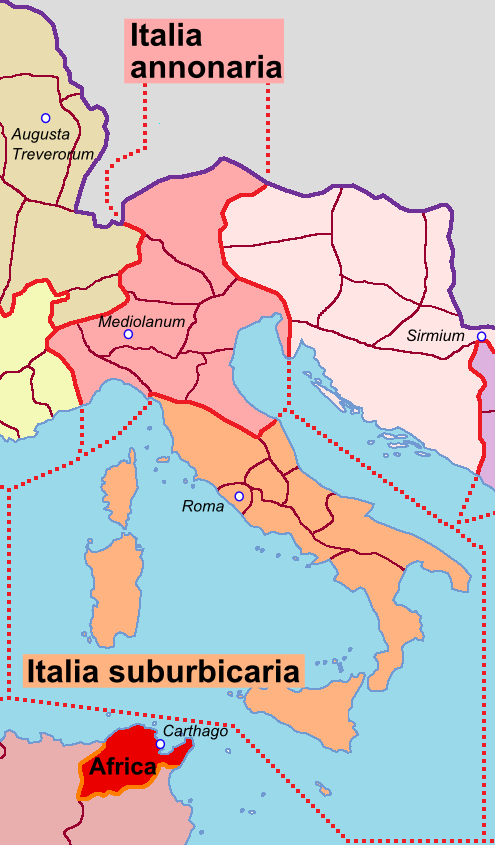
Italia annonaria and Italia suburbicaria dioceses

Constantine subdivided the Empire into four praetorian prefectures. The Diocesis Italiciana became the Praetorian prefecture of Italy (praefectura praetoria Italiae), and was subdivided into two dioceses. It still included Raetia. The two dioceses and their provinces were:

Diocesis Italia annonaria (Italy of the annona - its inhabitants had the obligation to provide the court, the administration and the troops, first allocated in Milan and then in Ravenna, supplies, wine and timber)

- Alpes Cottiae (modern Liguria and western part of Piedmont)
- Liguria (western Lombardy and eastern part of Piedmont)
- Venetia et Histria (Istria [which is now part of Croatia, Slovenia and Italy], Friuli-Venezia Giulia, Trentino-Alto Adige, Veneto and eastern and central Lombardy)
- Raetia I (eastern Switzerland and western Austria)
- Rhaetia II (central Austria, part of southern Germany, and part of northeastern Italy)
- Aemilia (the Emilia part of Emilia-Romagna)
- Flaminia et Picenum Annonarium (Romagna and northern Marche)

Diocesis Italia suburbicaria (Italy "under the government of the urbs", i.e. Rome)

- Tuscia (Etruria) et Umbria (Tuscany, Umbria and the northern part of coastal Lazio)
- Picenum suburbicarium (Piceno, in southern Marche)
- Valeria Sabina (the modern province of Rieti, other areas of Lazio and areas of Umbria and Abruzzo)
- Campania (central and southern coastal Lazio and coastal Campania except for the modern province of Salerno)
- Samnium (Abruzzo, Molise and the mountain areas of modern Campania; i.e., the modern provinces of Benevento and Avellino and part of the province of Caserta)
- Apulia et Calabria (today's Apulia)
- Lucania et Bruttium (modern Calabria, Basilicata and the province of Salerno in modern Campania)
- Sicilia (Sicily and Malta)
- Sardinia
- Corsica

=== Late Antiquity ===
In 330, Constantine completed the rebuilding of Byzantium as Constantinople. He established the Imperial court, a Senate, financial and judicial administrations, as well as the military structures. The new city, however, did not receive an urban prefect until 359 which raised it to the status of eastern capital. After the death of Theodosius in 395 and the subsequent division of the Empire, Italy was home base of the Western Roman Empire. As a result of Alaric's invasion in 402 the western seat was moved from Mediolanum to Ravenna. Alaric, king of Visigoths, sacked Rome itself in 410; something that had not happened for eight centuries. Northern Italy was attacked by Attila's Huns in 452. Rome was sacked in 455 again by the Vandals under the command of Genseric.

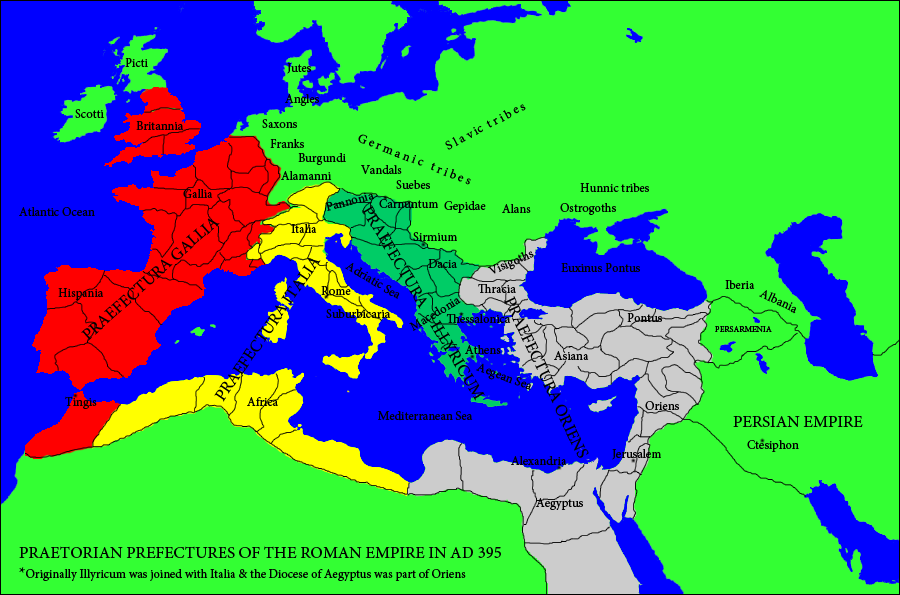
The Praetorian prefecture of Italy (in yellow) stretched from the Danube river to North Africa.

According to Notitia Dignitatum, one of the very few surviving documents of Roman government updated to the 420s, Roman Italy was governed by a praetorian prefect, Prefectus praetorio Italiae (who also governed the Diocese of Africa and the Diocese of Pannonia), one vicarius, and one comes rei militaris. The regions of Italy were governed at the end of the fourth century by eight consulares (Venetiae et Histriae, Aemiliae, Liguriae, Flaminiae et Piceni annonarii, Tusciae et Umbriae, Piceni suburbicarii, Campaniae, and Siciliae), two correctores (Apuliae et Calabriae and Lucaniae et Bruttiorum) and seven praesides (Alpium Cottiarum, Rhaetia Prima and Secunda, Samnii, Valeriae, Sardiniae, and Corsicae). In the fifth century, with the Emperors controlled by their barbarian generals, the Western Imperial government maintained weak control over Italy itself, whose coasts were periodically under attack.

In 476, with the abdication of Romulus Augustulus, the Western Roman Empire had formally fallen unless one considers Julius Nepos, the legitimate emperor recognized by Constantinople as the last. He was assassinated in 480 and may have been recognized by Odoacer. Italy remained under Odoacer and his Kingdom of Italy, and then under the Ostrogothic Kingdom.

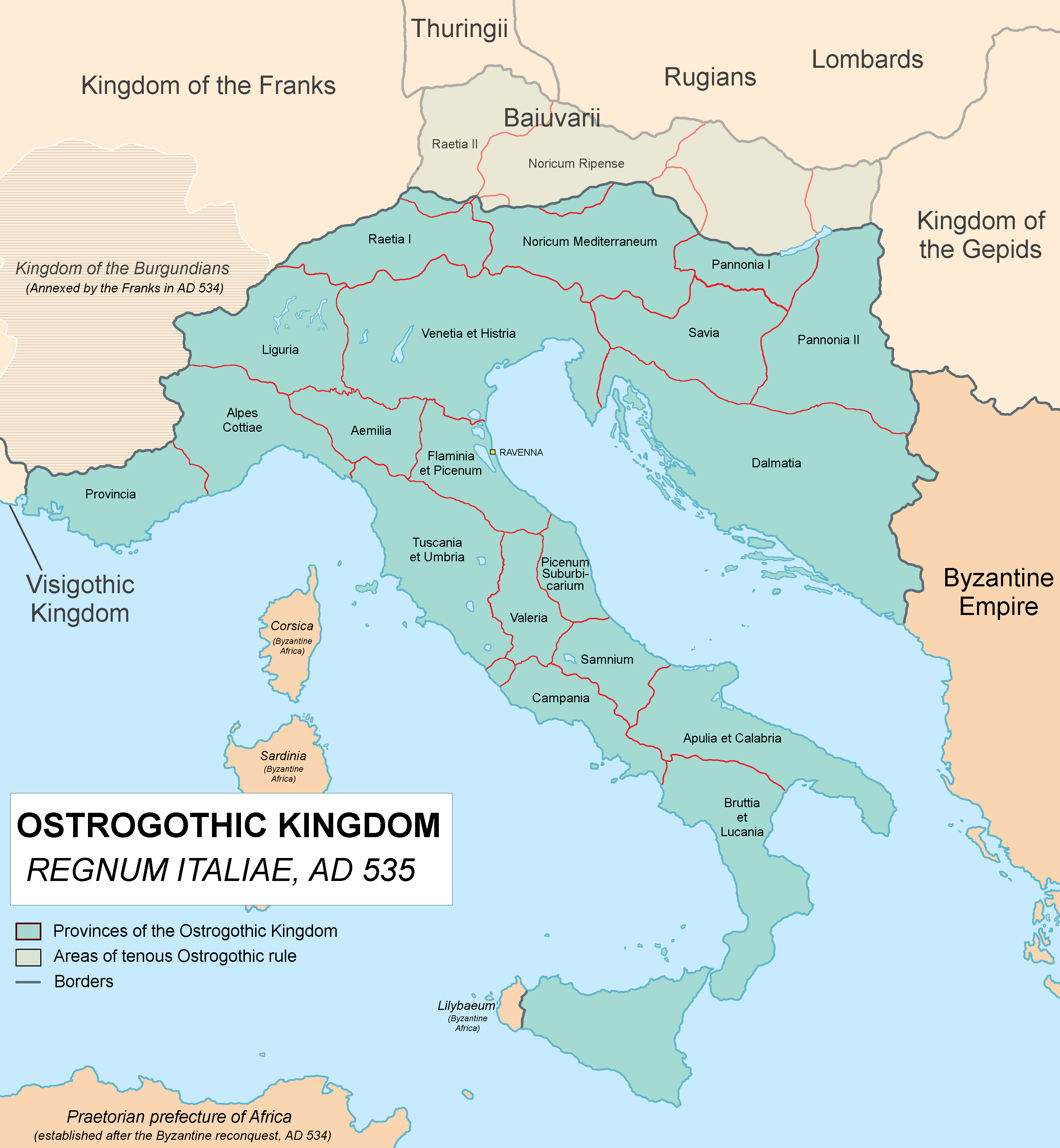
The "Kingdom of Italy" of Theodoric the Great in 535 AD

The Germanic successor states under Odoacer and Theodoric the Great continued to use the Roman administrative apparatus, as well as being nominal subjects of the Eastern emperor at Constantinople. In 535 Roman Emperor Justinian invaded Italy which suffered twenty years of disastrous war. In August 554, Justinian issued a Pragmatic sanction which maintained most of the organization of Diocletian.

The "Prefecture of Italy" thus survived, and was reestablished under Roman control in the course of Justinian's Gothic War.

As a result of the Lombard invasion in 568, the Byzantines lost most of Italy, except the territories of the Exarchate of Ravenna – a corridor from Venice to Lazio via Perugia – and footholds in the south Naples and the toe and heel of the peninsula.

With the Longobards started the division of Italy, that lasted until 1861.

== See also ==
- List of ancient peoples of Italy
