= Italia suburbicaria =

Late Roman administrative vicariate

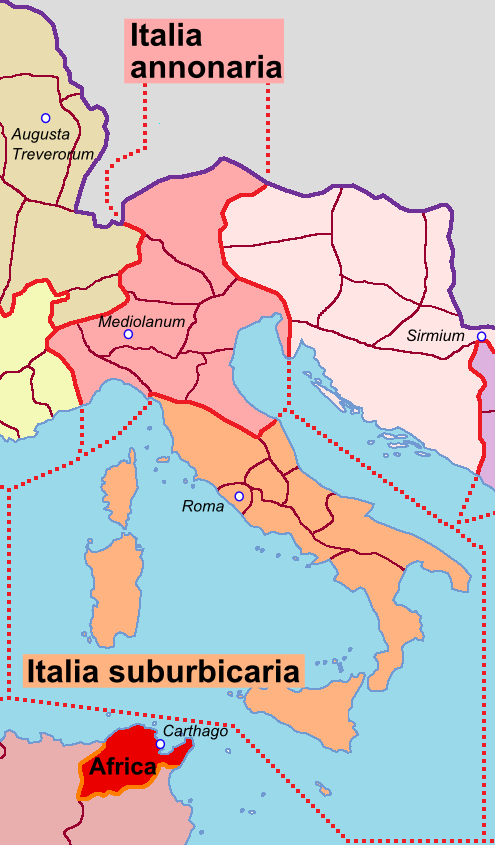
- The vicariates of Italia suburbicaria and Italia annonaria within the Praetorian prefecture of Italy around AD 400

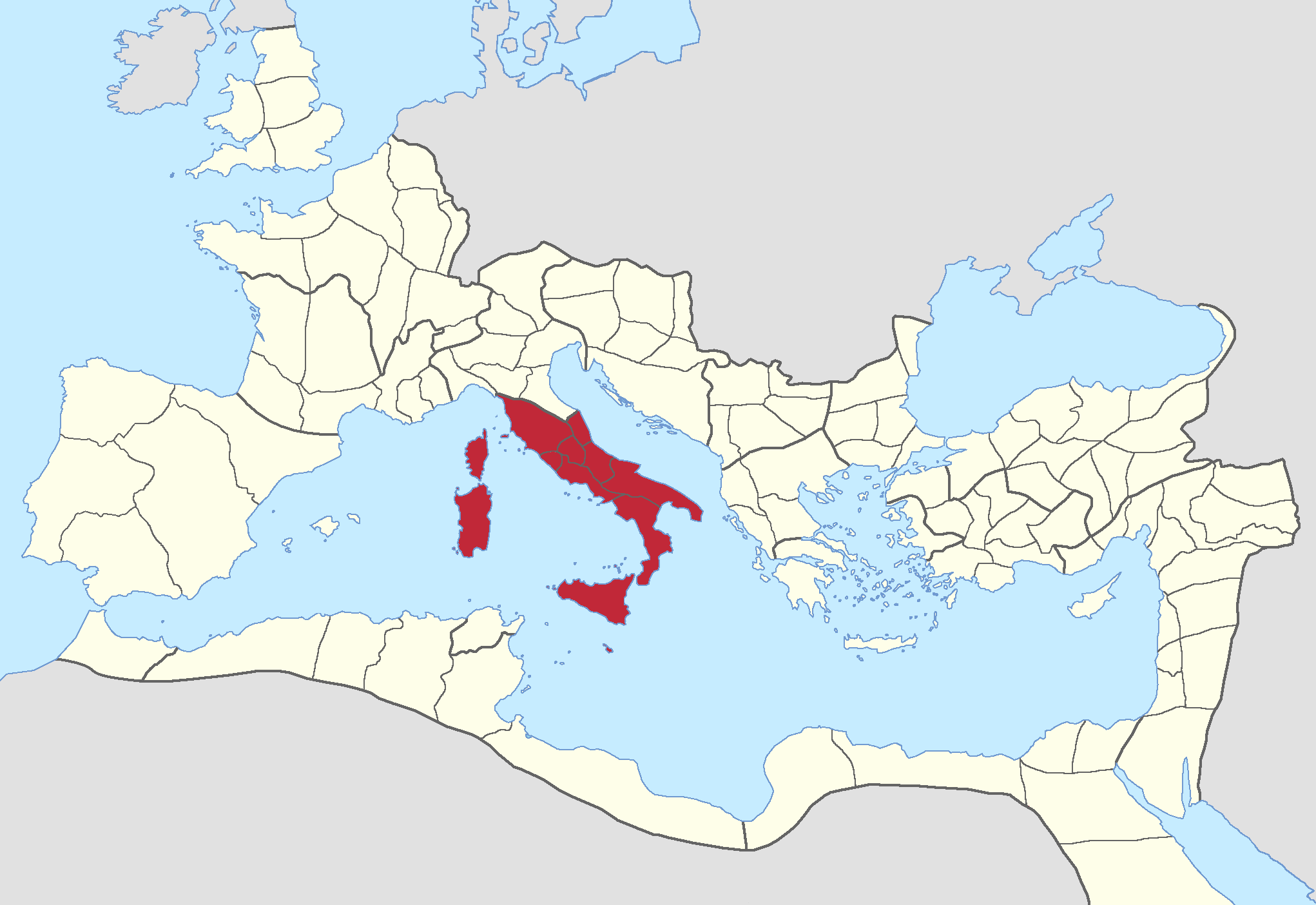
- Capital: Rome
- Historical era: Late Antiquity
- Today part of: Italy; France; Malta

Italia suburbicaria ("Italy under the authority of the urbs", i.e. Rome) was a vicariate of the late Roman Empire established by Constantine I (306–337).

It included south-central Italy and the islands of Sicily, Sardinia, and Corsica. Its capital was Rome, where the vicarius urbis Romae, the highest civil authority of the vicariate, had its seat.

Along with Italia annonaria, it was one of two administrative divisions of late Roman Italy.

== History ==
Under Constantine I, the dioecesis Italiciana was divided into two administrative partitions or vicariates, each governed by a vicarius: Italia suburbicaria and Italia annonaria. In fact, sources such as the Laterculus Veronensis and the Notitia Dignitatum attest that de jure Italy continued to be subdivided into a single diocese, the dioecesis Italiciana, which in turn was divided into two vicariates. However, since Italia annonaria and Italia suburbicaria were each governed by a vicarius, they are often improperly called dioceses since de facto they were, while not being de jure. The vicariate of Italia suburbicaria included south-central Italy and the islands of Sicily, Sardinia, and Corsica. The dividing line between Italia suburbicaria and Italia annonaria was placed at the Arno and Esino rivers. The tax in annona and foodstuffs paid by the inhabitants of the vicariate was used essentially to supply and feed the plebs of Rome. The highest civil authority was the vicarius urbis Romae, resident in Rome. The office probably originated from the so-called agens vices praefectorum praetorio, who, beginning in the Severan age, replaced the Praetorian prefect in commanding the praetorian guard and troops of the capital during his absence from the Urbe. Constantine, after demilitarizing the Urbe to prevent revolts and usurpations (the praetorian guard had supported Maxentius), transformed Rome's agens vices praefectorum praetorio into the vicarius urbis Romae, stripping him of all military power and making him the highest civil authority in Italia suburbicaria.

At the time of the Laterculus Veronensis (drafted around AD 314) it probably consisted of the following provinces:

1. Tuscia et Umbria
2. Campania
3. Apulia et Calabria
4. Lucania et Bruttii
5. Sicilia
6. Sardinia et Corsica

At the time of the Notitia Dignitatum (written around AD 395 and updated for the West until around AD 420), it consisted of the following ten provinces:

1. Tuscia et Umbria (Tuscany, Umbria and the northern part of coastal Lazio)
2. Picenum Suburbicarium (Piceno, in southern Marche)
3. Valeria (northern Latium and southern Umbria)
4. Campania (central and southern coastal Lazio and coastal Campania except for the modern Province of Salerno)
5. Samnium (Abruzzo, Molise, Sannio and Cassino)
6. Apulia et Calabria (Puglia and Salento, and Irpinia)
7. Lucania et Bruttii (Cilento, Basilicata and Calabria)
8. Sicilia (Sicily and Malta)
9. Sardinia et Corsica

Even after the fall of the Western Roman Empire, the vicariate administration seems to have survived. In the late 6th/early 7th century (Byzantine era), deputies of the prefects of the praetorium (agentes vices), or vicarii, in Genoa and Rome are mentioned in papal epistles. However, by the end of the 6th century, the office of vicarius had lost much prestige, both because of the growing importance of military officers, who often arrogated powers normally reserved for civilian officers, and because of the conquests of the Longobards. Already in Ostrogothic times, the vicarius urbis Romae had lost the government of the diocese, becoming, according to Hartmann, a collaborator of the praefectus urbi; the vicar's jurisdiction was reduced to the city of Rome and its surroundings up to 40 miles away. Cosentino, on the other hand, denies Hartmann's thesis, pointing out that in 557 the vicarii are still attested as dependent on the prefect of the praetorium of Italy and not on the praefectus urbi. By the end of the 6th century (Byzantine era), the vicarii were concerned only with managing finances, having lost much of their former authority. The vicarius urbis Romae seems to have become less important than the praefectus urbi and then disappeared from the sources.
