= Lucania et Bruttium =

Province of the Roman Empire

Lucania et Bruttium Provincia de Lucania et Bruttium (Latin)
- Roman province of Roman Empire (c. AD 7 - 292)
- c. AD 7 – AD 292
- Map of the regions of Roman Italy, with Lucania et Bruttii shown in peach (mid-bottom right)
- Capital: Salerno
- Historical era: Antiquity
  - Establishment establishment of the Augustan regions of Italy: c. AD 7
  - Reform of Diocletian: c. AD 292
- Today part of: Italy

Lucania et Bruttium, or Lucania et Bruttii, was a southern Italian province of the Roman Empire, which was governed by a corrector. Established under Augustus as the third region (Regio III) of Roman Italy, it encompassed the areas of Lucania (a name still used to describe modern-day Basilicata) and Bruttium (modern-day Calabria).

== See also ==
- Regions of Augustan Italy
- Roman province
- Southern Italy
