= Italia Annonaria =

Late Roman administrative vicariate

Italia annonaria
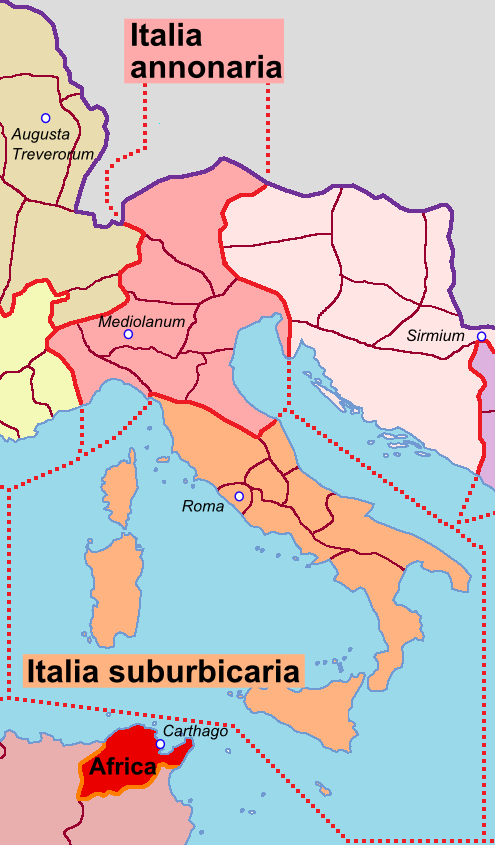
- The vicariates of Italia suburbicaria and Italia annonaria within the Praetorian prefecture of Italy around AD 400

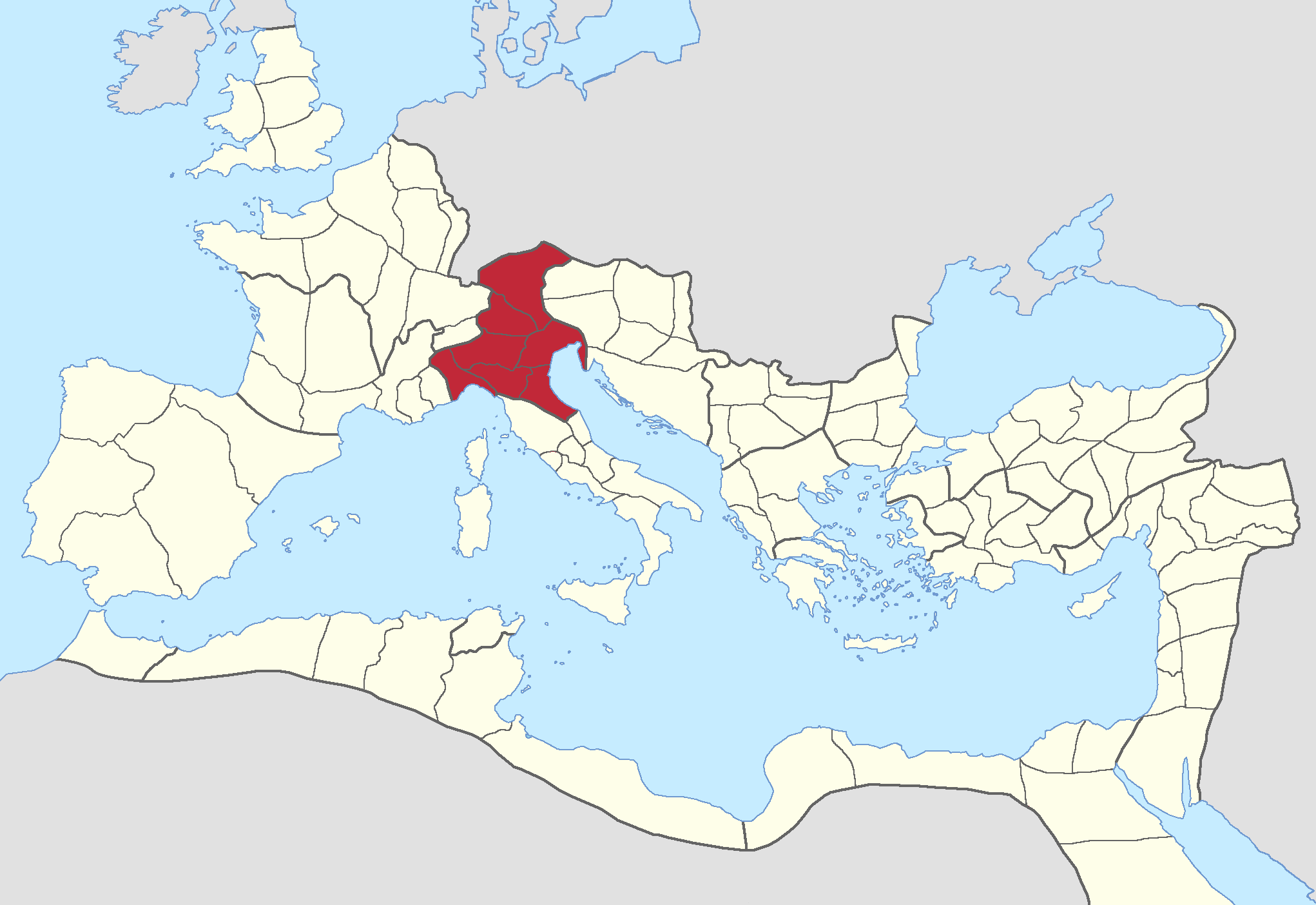
- Capital: Mediolanum
- Historical era: Late Antiquity
- Today part of: Italy; Switzerland; Slovenia; Croatia; Germany

Italia annonaria ("Italy of the annona") was a vicariate of the Roman Empire established by Constantine I (306–337).

It included northern Italy and extended as far north as Raetia. Its capital was Mediolanum (Milan).

Along with Italia suburbicaria, it was one of two administrative divisions of late Roman Italy.

== Description ==
Under Constantine I, the Dioecesis Italiciana was divided into two administrative divisions, or vicariates, each governed by a vicarius: Italia Suburbicaria and Italia Annonaria. In fact, contemporary sources, such as the Laterculus Veronensis and the Notitia Dignitatum, attest that, de jure, Italy continued to be divided into a single diocese, the dioecesis Italiciana, which was in turn subdivided into two vicariates. However, as Italia Annonaria and Italia Suburbicaria were each governed by a vicarius (the highest civil authority within a diocese), they are often incorrectly referred to as dioceses, as they were de facto diocese but not de jure.

The vicariate of Italia Annonaria comprised the northern part of the Italian peninsula, Raetia and the Cottian Alps. The boundary between Italia Suburbicaria and Italia Annonaria was drawn along the rivers Arno and Esino. The inhabitants were obliged to supply the court, the administration and the troops – initially stationed in Milan and later in Ravenna – with provisions, wine and timber.

The highest civil authority was the vicarius Italiae, who resided in Milan. Italia Annonaria was divided into the following provinces:

Under Constantine I:

1. Venetia et Histria, governed by a corrector.
2. Aemilia et Liguria, governed by a corrector.
3. Flaminia et Picenum, governed by a corrector.
4. Raetia, governed by a praeses.
5. Alpes Cottiae, governed by a praeses.

Under Theodosius I:

1. Venetia et Histria, governed by a consularis.
2. Liguria, governed by a consularis.
3. Aemilia, governed by a consularis.
4. Flaminia et Picenum Annonarium, governed by a consularis.
5. Raetia Prima, governed by a praeses.
6. Raetia Secunda, governed by a praeses.
7. Alpes Cottiae, retta da un praeses.

The vicariate appears to have survived even the fall of the Western Roman Empire, as the vicarius Italiae (as agens vices, or vice-prefect) is still attested in contemporary sources in Genoa at the end of the 6th century. Evidently, as Diehl has argued in the past, the vicarius of annonaria Italia, who was initially based in Milan, took refuge in Genoa following the Lombard conquest (569). In any case, due to the militarisation of Byzantine Italy – reorganised into an exarchate (the Exarchate of Italy) following the Lombard invasion – and the Lombard conquests, the vicarius lost much of his former authority, being left to deal solely with the management of finances. The vicarius Italiae probably ceased to exist with the Lombard conquest of Liguria by Rotari (643) or shortly before that.
