= Liguria (Roman province) =

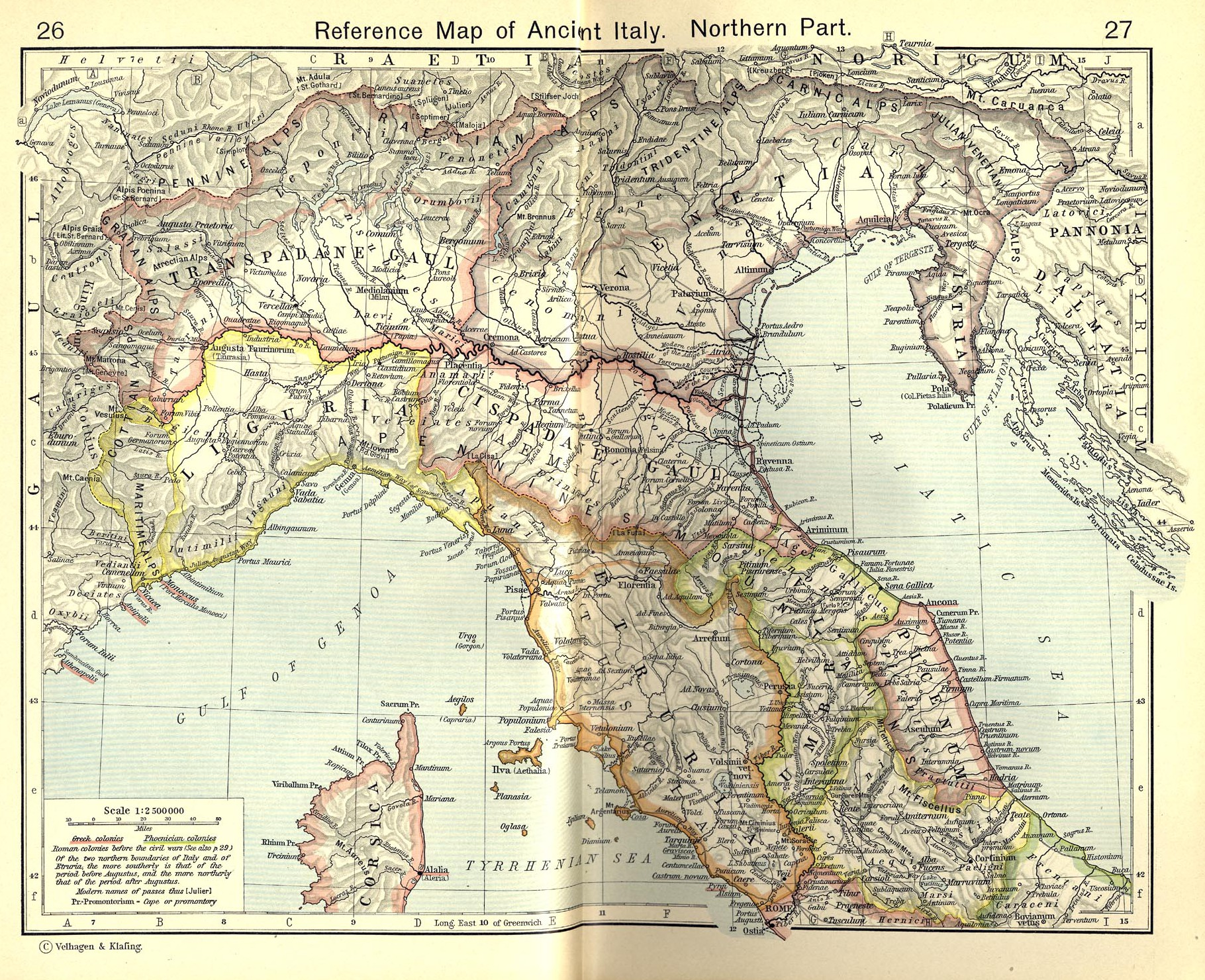
Reference map of Northern Italy in ancient times, with different boundaries dating back to periods both before and after Augustus.

Liguria was a late Roman province in Italy in the 4th–6th centuries. Despite its name, it encompassed most of the modern Italian region of Piedmont and parts of Lombardy, but not the medieval and modern region of Liguria, which was included in the province of Alpes Cottiae. The province's capital was Mediolanum (Milan) and it was governed by an official of consularis rank. Administratively, it was subject to the Diocese of Annonarian Italy and to the praetorian prefecture of Italy. Despite being under Roman rule, Liguria was not as culturally or economically integrated as other provinces, and some pre-Roman local traditions persisted into the first century CE.
