= Corrector =

Person or object that practices correction

A corrector (English plural correctors, Latin plural correctores) is a person or object practicing correction, usually by removing or rectifying errors. The word is originally a Roman title, corrector, derived from the Latin verb corrigere, meaning "to make straight, set right, bring into order". Apart from the general sense of anyone who corrects mistakes, it has been used as, or part of (some commonly shortened again to Corrector), various specific titles and offices, sometimes quite distant from the original meaning.

== Secular offices ==
=== Ancient Rome ===
The office of corrector first appears during the Principate in the reign of Trajan (r. 98–117), for extraordinary officials of senatorial rank, who were tasked with investigating and reforming the administration in the provinces. To this end, they were entrusted with full imperium maius, which extended also to territories normally exempt from the authority of the Emperor's provincial governors: the free cities of the Greek East, the senatorial provinces, as well as Italy herself. The full title of these officials, from their institution to the end of the 3rd century, was in Latin legatus Augusti pro praetore [missus] ad corrigendum [ordinandum] statum, in Greek rendered as πρεσβευτὴς καἰ ἀντιστράτηγος Σεβαστοῦ διορθωτὴς [or ἐπανορθωτὴς] (presbeutes kai antistrategos Sebastou diorthotes/epanorthotes). From the late 3rd century on, the title was increasingly, and afterwards exclusively, simplified as corrector in Latin and διορθωτὴς (or ἐπανορθωτὴς) in Greek.

The sending of correctores to the Greek free cities, as well as to Italy, which as a metropolitan territory formally enjoyed a status different from the provinces, began a process of slow degradation of their distinct legal status and their gradual assimilation to the "ordinary" provinces, a process completed with the reforms of Diocletian (r. 284–305). Thus, at the start of the 4th century, all Italian districts (and Sicily) had a corrector as governor, although by the middle of the century most were replaced by governors with the rank of consularis. In the administrative division as preserved in the Notitia Dignitatum, the correctores held the senatorial rank of vir clarissimus. Those of the West Roman Empire ranked between the consulares and the ordinary praesides, while in the East Roman Empire, they ranked below the praesides. According to the Notitia Dignitatum, ca. 400 the following provinces were under correctores:

- Apulia et Calabria, in southern Italy
- Lucania et Bruttium, in southern Italy
- Savia, in Pannonia (Balkans)
- Augustamnica, in Egypt
- Paphlagonia, in Asia Minor (Anatolia)

The corrector's staff (officium) is also specified: princeps officii, cornicularius, two tabularii, commentariensis, adiutor, ab actis, subadiuva; finally unspecified exceptores and 'other' cohortalini, i.e. menial staff. Two famous but extraordinary correctores were Odaenathus and his son Vaballathus, who rose to prominence after Emperor Valerian was defeated and captured by the Sassanid Persians in 260. Odaenathus not only defended the frontier in the East, but succeeded in creating an almost independent state (known as the Palmyrene Empire, after its capital Palmyra), though it nominally remained within the Roman Empire.

For his efforts, he gained the title of corrector totius orientis, "Corrector of the Whole East". When he died, his son requested and obtained, after some years, the same title, but later styled himself Augustus; Emperor Aurelian marched East to quash this open rebellion, defeating and capturing Vaballathus as well as his mother (and de facto ruler) Queen Zenobia. In various municipia, corrector became the title of a permanent single chief magistrate (traditionally there had been collegial systems, e.g. two consules or duumviri), as a Byzantine 7th-century source attests for thirteen cities in the Egyptian province Augustamnica Prima.

=== Feudal times ===
- Corrector of the Press

== Ecclesiastic (Catholic) titles ==
- In the Roman Curia (papal ecclesiastical administration), there is an office of corrector and reviser of the books of the Vatican Library; of the former Tribunal of Correctors, abolished by Pius VII, only a substitute-corrector among the Abbreviatores was maintained
- In the regular order of the Minims it was the style of Superiors at the convent level, and the higher level, all elected; at the central level, the title is Corrector General, and at the level of the province, Corrector Provincial.
- Correctores Romani was the name of a pontifical canon law commission, installed by Gregory XIII, later increased to thirty-five members by Pius V in 1566, which revised the text of the Corpus Iuris Canonici.

Furthermore, the word Corrector was used as the title of several publications, some of which are quite famous, such as the 19th book, also known as Medicus, of the Ancient canons. The derived term correctorium has been used for revisions of the text of the Vulgate Bible, begun in 1236 by the Dominicans under the French Cardinal Hugh of St. Cher.

== Publishing ==
In the publishing of literature or other information, editors assume the correctional roles of proofreaders and copy editors in the editing cycle.

== Objects ==
The term is used for various devices used to correct another, as with a ship's compass or artillery.

== See also ==
- Censor
- Correctory, text-form of the Latin Vulgate resulting from the critical emendation in the 13th century
- Critic

== Sources and external links ==
- Catholic Encyclopaedia (various entries; more still to be checked, use its search)
