= Diocese of Asia =

Diocese of the later Roman Empire, 314–535

Diocese of Asia Dioecesis Asiana Διοίκησις Άσίας
- Diocese of the Roman Empire
- 314 – 535
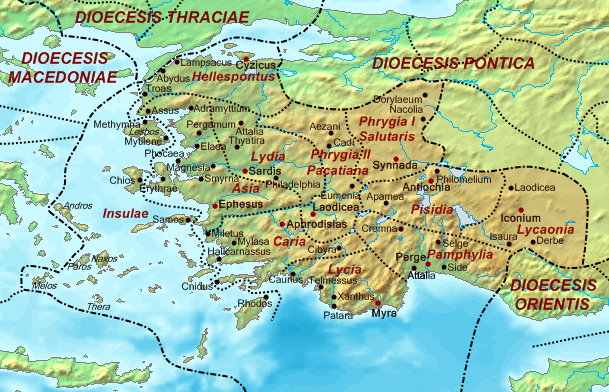
- The Diocese of Asia c. 400.
- Capital: Ephesus
- Historical era: Late Antiquity
  - Established: 314
  - Diocese abolished by Justinian I: 535
- Today part of: Greece; Turkey

The Diocese of Asia (Latin: Dioecesis Asiana, Greek: Διοίκησις Ἀσίας/Άσιανῆς) was a diocese of the later Roman Empire, incorporating the provinces of western Asia Minor and the islands of the eastern Aegean Sea. The diocese was established after the reforms of Diocletian, was subordinate to the Praetorian prefecture of the East, and was abolished during the reforms of Justinian I in 535.

It was one of the most populous and wealthy dioceses of the Empire, and included 11 provinces: Asia, Hellespontus, Pamphylia, Caria, Lydia, Lycia, Lycaonia, Pisidia, Phrygia Pacatiana, Phrygia Salutaria and Insulae.

== List of known Vicarii Asiae ==
- Flavius Ablabius (324–326)
- Tertullianus (c. 330)
- Veronicianus (334–335)
- Scylacius (c. 343)
- Anatolius (c. 352)
- Araxius (353–354)
- Germanus (360)
- Italicianus (361)
- Caesarius (362–363)
- Clearchus (363–366)
- Auxonius (366–367)
- Musonius (367–368)
