= Diocese of Hispania =

Administrative unit of the Roman Empire on the Iberian Peninsula

Diocese of Hispania Diocesis Hispaniarum (Latin)
- Diocese of Roman Empire (c. AD 298 - 395), Western Roman Empire (c. AD 395–409)
- c. AD 298 – AD 409
- Diocese of Hispania, c. 400 AD
- Capital: Augusta Emerita (modern-day Mérida, Spain)
- Demonym: Hispanian
- Historical era: Late antiquity
  - Reform of Diocletian: c. AD 298
  - Division of the Roman Empire: c. AD 395
  - Conquest by Vandals, Suebi, and Alans: c. AD 409
Preceded by
Hispania Baetica
Lusitania
Hispania Tarraconensis
Succeeded by
Kingdom of the Suebi
Alans
Vandal Kingdom
- Today part of: Morocco, Portugal, Spain

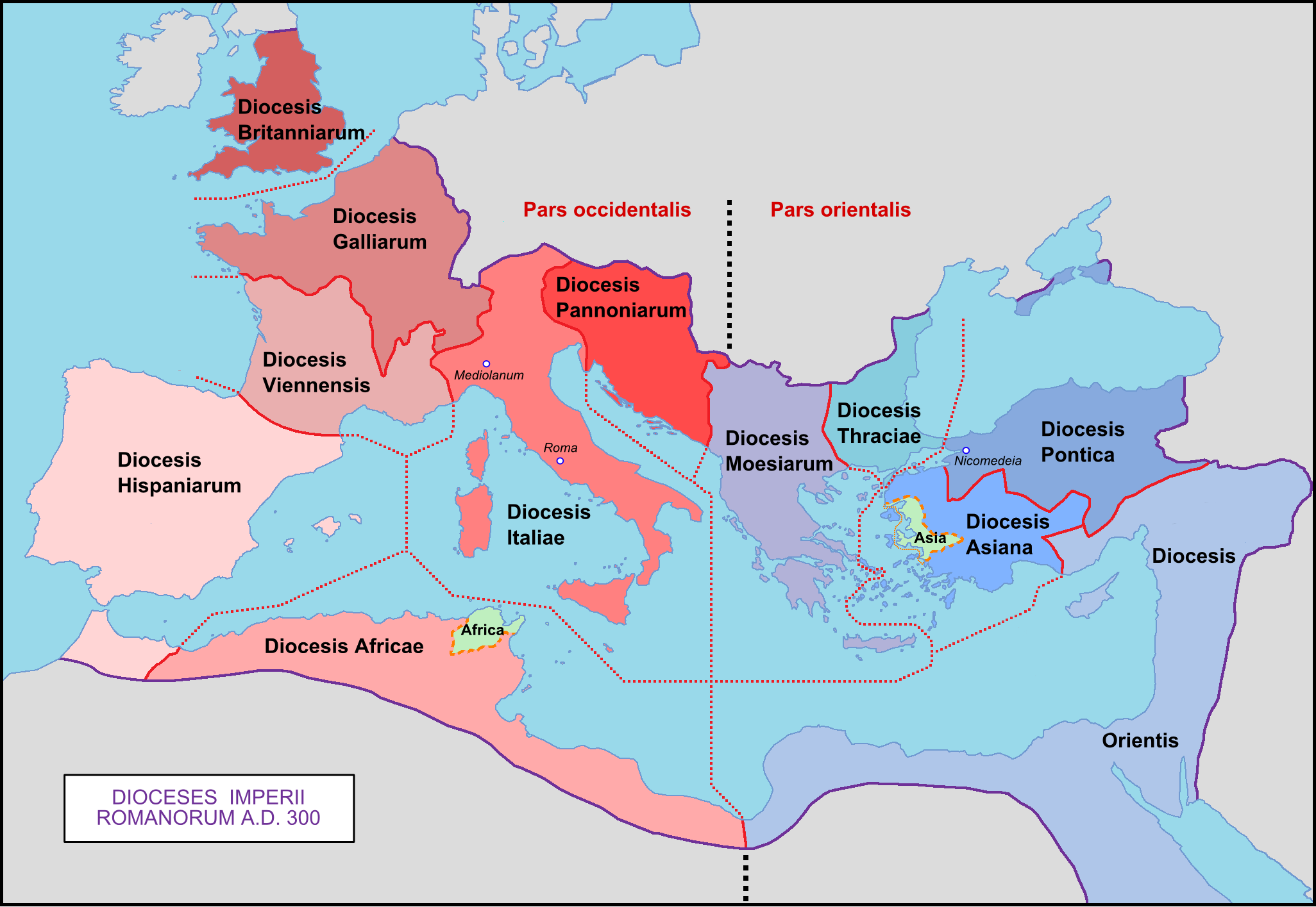
Roman diocese from around 293 to 337

Provinces of Hispania under Diocletian (Mauretania Tingitana not shown)

The Diocese of Hispania was a late antique administrative unit (Dioecesis) of the Roman Empire on the Iberian Peninsula. It existed from 298 to about 461 AD. Its capital was Augusta Emerita. The diocese was governed by a vicarius responsible to the praetorian prefect of Gaul.

== Organization ==
The Diocese of Hispania originally comprised the following six provinces:

- Hispania Baetica
- Lusitania
- Hispania Carthaginensis
- Gallaecia
- Hispania Tarraconensis
- Mauretania Tingitana (in North Africa)

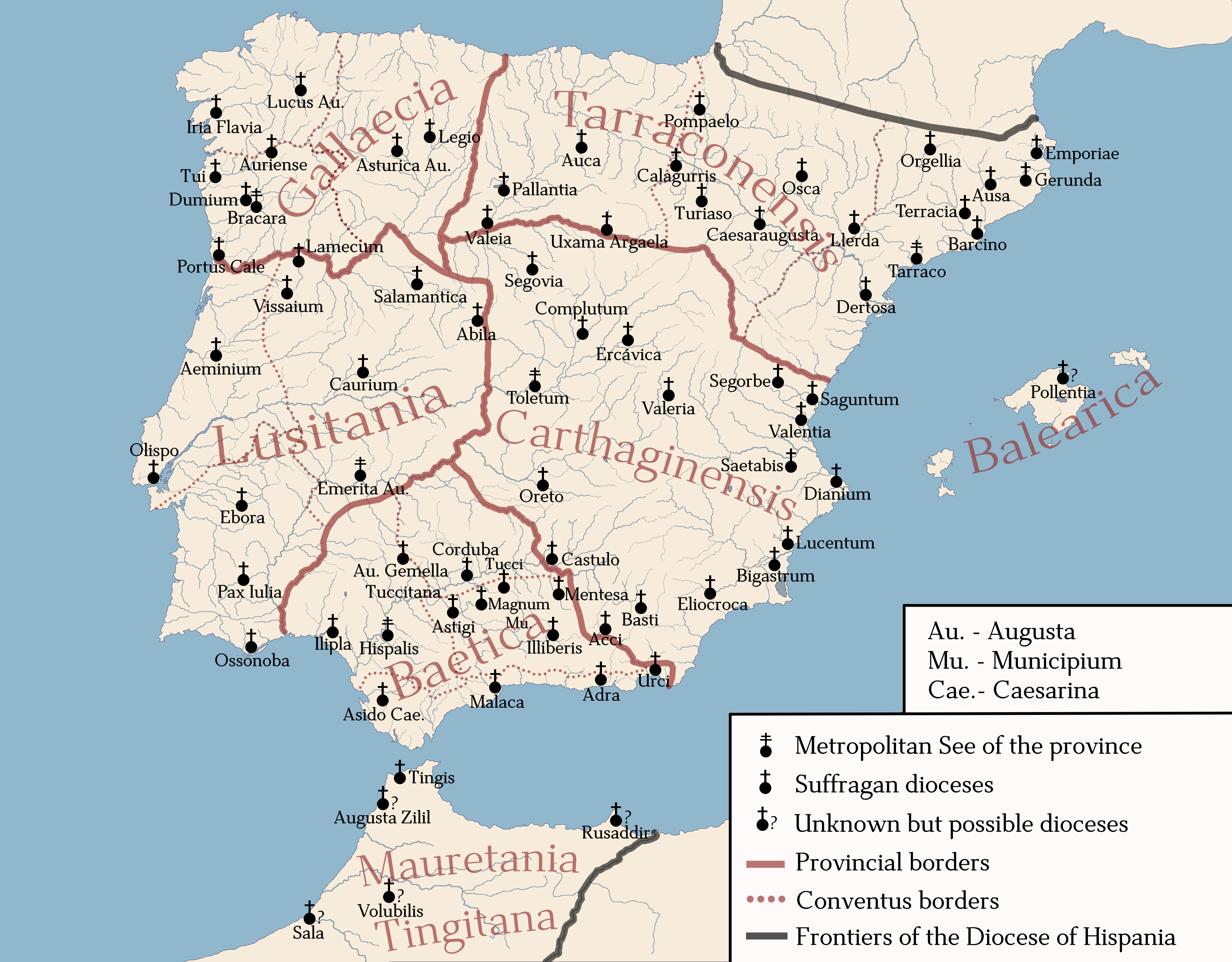
This map illustrates the 'Diocesis Hispaniarum,' highlighting its ecclesial metropolitan sees and their suffragan dioceses, as detailed by Frederick Meyrick in his book, 'The Church in Spain.' The map also includes the province of Balearica.

The Balearic Islands were detached from Tarraconensis in the 4th century as the independent province of Hispania Balearica, becoming the seventh province within the Diocese of Hispania.

== History ==
The Roman Empire was initially divided into 46 provinces, which were subdivided by Diocletian around 300 AD into 101 provinces, which in turn were grouped into 12 dioceses. At the division of the Empire in 395, the structure was changed into four prefectures, 15 dioceses and 119 provinces. With the conquest of Hispania by the Vandals, Alans, and Suebi in 409, the diocese began to collapse.
