= Province of Apulia and Calabria =

Apulia and Calabria Provincia Apuliae et Calabriae (Latin)
- Roman province of Roman Empire (c. AD 298 - 395), Western Roman Empire (c. AD 395–476)
- c. AD 297 – AD 476
- Capital: Canusium (modern-day Canosa di Puglia)
- Historical era: Late antiquity
  - Reform of Diocletian: c. AD 314
  - Fall of the Western Roman Empire: c. AD 476
Preceded by	Succeeded by
Regio II Apulia et Calabria	Kingdom of Odoacer
- Today part of: Italy

Apulia and Calabria (Latin: Apulia et Calabria) was a Late Roman province in the ancient southern Italian territories of Apulia and Calabria – both roughly included in the modern Apulia region, with Calabria being the Roman term for Salento (distinct from Bruttium, which corresponds to modern Calabria). Its capital was Canusium (modern Canosa di Puglia).
