= Diocese of Gaul =

District of the Roman Empire (314–486)

Diocese of Gaul Dioecesis Galliarum
- Diocese of the Roman Empire
- 314–486
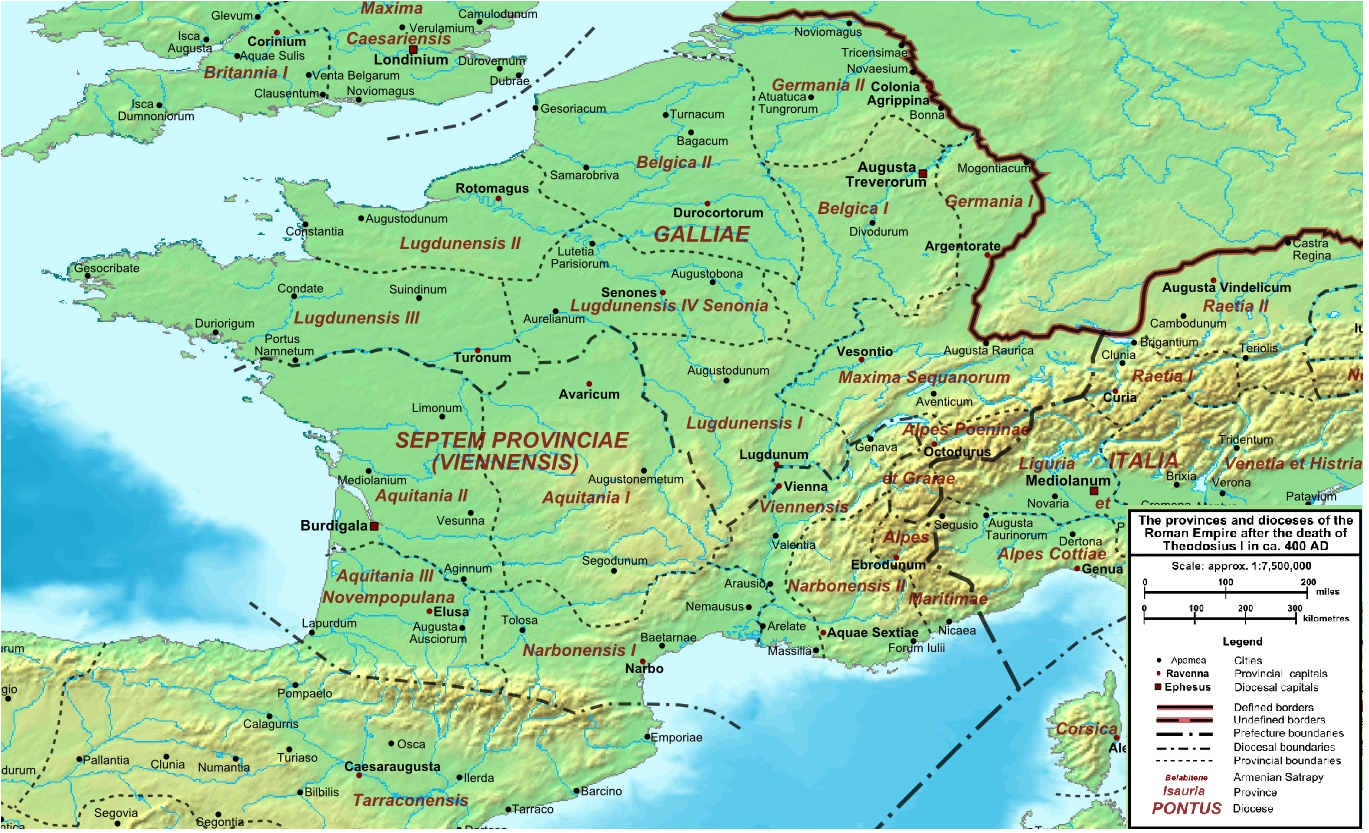
- Roman Gaul - AD 400
- Capital: Augusta Treverorum
- Historical era: Late Antiquity
  - Established: 314
  - last Roman territory overrun by Franks: 486

The Diocese of Gaul (Latin: Dioecesis Galliarum, "diocese of the Gaul [province]s") was a diocese of the later Roman Empire, under the praetorian prefecture of Gaul. It encompassed northern and eastern Gaul, that is, modern France north and east of the Loire, including the Low Countries and modern Germany west of the Rhine.

The diocese comprised the following provinces: Gallia Lugdunensis I, Gallia Lugdunensis II, Gallia Lugdunensis III, Gallia Lugdunensis IV (Senonia), Belgica I, Belgica II, Germania I, Germania II, Alpes Poenninae et Graiae and Maxima Sequanorum.

== History ==
The diocese was established after the reforms of Diocletian and Constantine I in c. 314. In the year 407, the Rhine frontier was breached, and much of Gaul lost to barbarian tribes temporarily. Roman control over most of Gaul and the Rhineland was restored until the death of Valentinian III in 455. The territory remaining in Roman hands after the 450s was in the south in the Auvergne and Provence until ceded in 475 and in the northwest, the so-called "Domain of Soissons". After its fall to the Franks in 486 and the end of Roman administration in northern Gaul, the diocese can be said to have de facto ended.
