= Dacia Aureliana =

Province of the Roman Empire (275-283)

Provincia Dacia Ἐπαρχία Δακίας
- Province of the Roman Empire
- 275–280s (by 285)
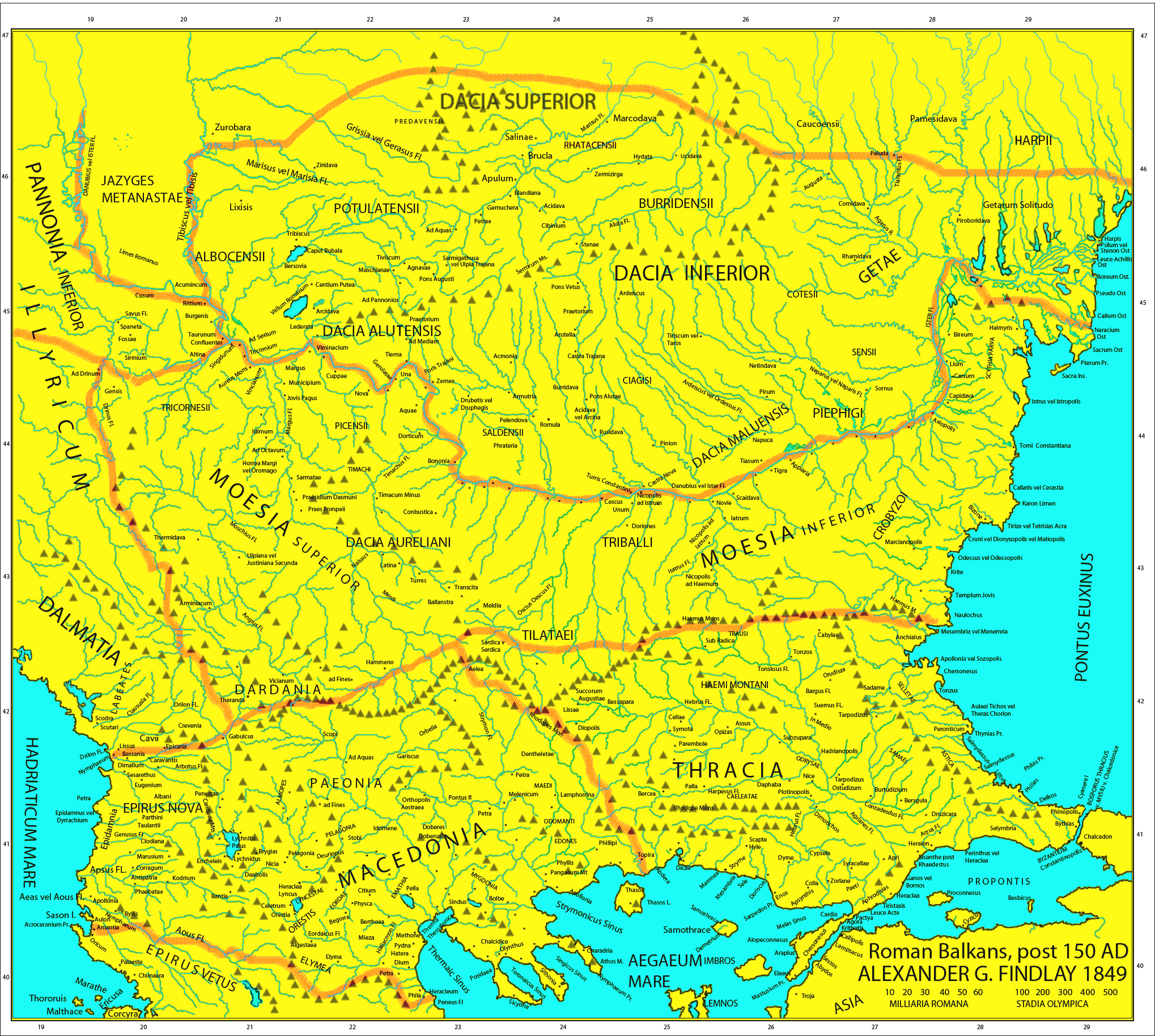
- Dacia Aureliana, together with other Balkan provinces and former Dacia Traiana
- Capital: Serdica
- Historical era: Classical Antiquity
  - Established: 275
  - Disestablished: 280s (by 285)
Preceded by	Succeeded by
Moesia Superior	Dacia Ripensis; Dacia Mediterranea
- Today part of: Bulgaria; Serbia; Romania

Dacia Aureliana was a province in the eastern half of the Roman Empire established by Roman Emperor Aurelian in the territory of former Moesia Superior after his evacuation of Dacia Traiana beyond the Danube in 271. Between 271/275 and 285, it occupied most of what is today northwestern Bulgaria and eastern Serbia. Its capital was in Serdica (modern Sofia).

This province was populated with a part of the former inhabitants of Dacia Traiana. It is written in Eutropius' work: Abridgment of Roman History (9:15):

"He surrounded the city of Rome with stronger walls. He built a temple to the Sun, in which he put a vast quantity of gold and precious stones. The province of Dacia, which Trajan had formed beyond the Danube, he gave up, despairing, after all Illyricum and Moesia had been depopulated, of being able to retain it. The Roman citizens, removed from the towns and lands of Dacia, he settled in the interior of Moesia, calling that Dacia which now divides the two Moesiae, and which is on the right hand of the Danube as it runs to the sea, whereas Dacia was previously on the left."

("Urbem Romam muris firmioribus cinxit. Templum Soli aedificavit, in quo infinitum auri gemmarumque constituit. Provinciam Daciam, quam Traianus ultra Danubium fecerat, intermisit, vastato omni Illyrico et Moesia, desperans eam posse retinere, abductosque Romanos ex urbibus et agris Daciae in media Moesia collocavit appellavitque eam Daciam, quae nunc duas Moesias dividit et est in dextra Danubio in mare fluenti, cum antea fuerit in laeva.") However, scholars have varying opinions regarding the exact data of the depopulation of Dacia. The Emperor Diocletian's tetrarchy reorganization of the empire divided Dacia Aureliana into two provinces, both part of the civil diocese of Moesia(e), under the eastern Caesar (junior emperor), whose 'quarter' became the Praetorian prefecture of Illyricum:

- Dacia Mediterranea, with its capital at Serdica
- Dacia Ripensis, with its capital at Ratiaria

In the fourth century reform (also splitting Italy in two while separating Egypt from Oriens and Macedonia from Moeasiae as new dioceses), these two “Dacias” along with Dardania, Moesia Prima, and Prevalitana constituted the Civil diocese of Dacia. Scholars have varying opinions regarding the exact date and circumstances of the creation of Dacia Mediterranea as a separate province.

Map of the northern Balkans in the 6th century, including the Diocese of Dacia and its provinces

== Sources ==
- Grumeza, Ion (2009). Dacia: Land of Transylvania, Cornerstone of Ancient Eastern Europe. Lanham: Hamilton Books. ISBN 9780761844662.
- Mócsy, András (2014) [1974]. Pannonia and Upper Moesia: A History of the Middle Danube Provinces of the Roman Empire. New York: Routledge. ISBN 9781317754251.
- Southern, Pat (2001). The Roman Empire from Severus to Constantine. London and New York: Routledge. ISBN 9781134553815.
- Zeiller, Jacques (1918). Les origines chrétiennes dans les provinces danubiennes de l'Empire romain. Paris: E. De Boccard.
