= Praeses =

Latin word

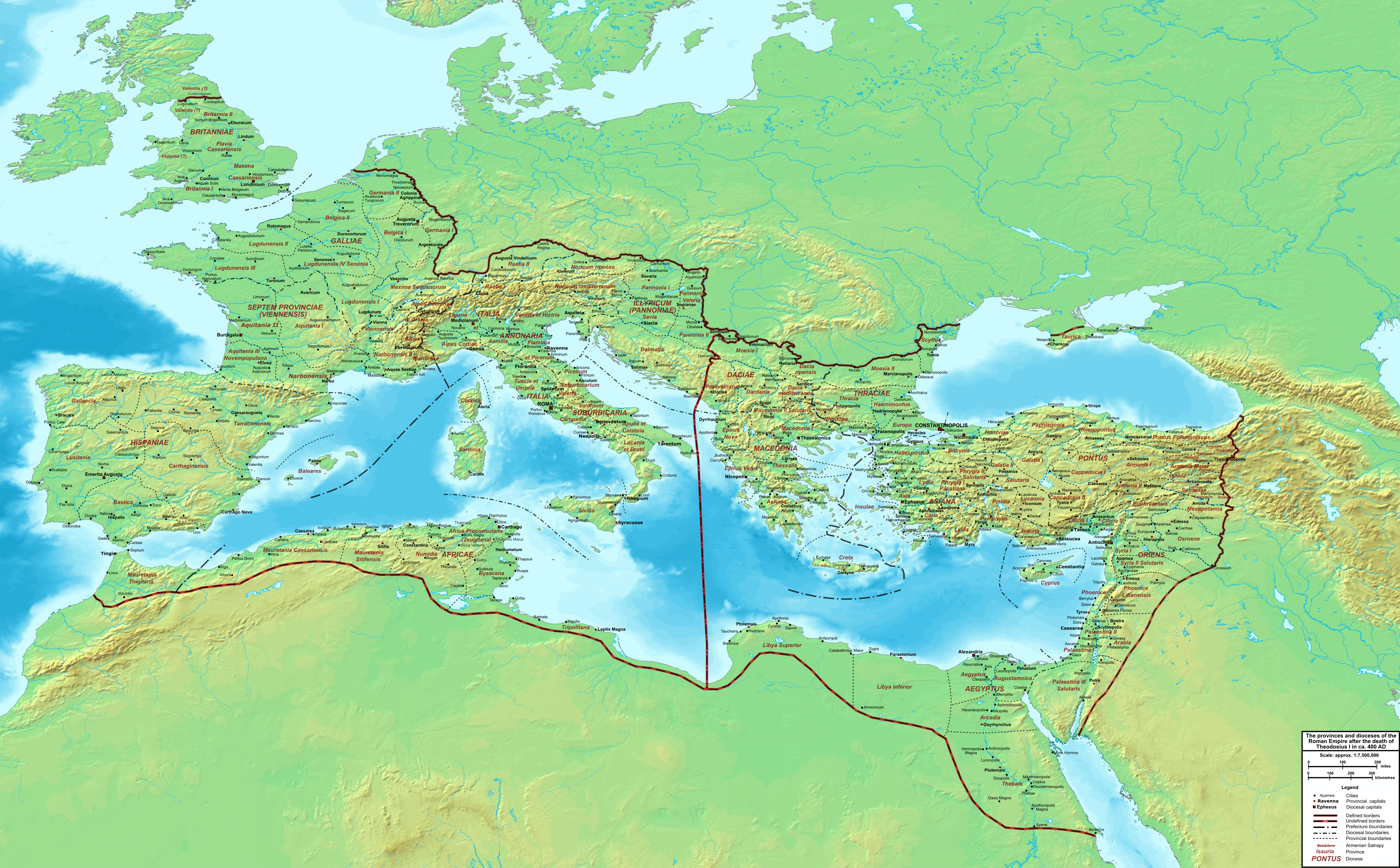
Map of the Roman Empire c. 400 CE.

Praeses (Latin pl. praesides) is a Latin word meaning "placed before" or "at the head". In antiquity, notably under the Roman Dominate, it was used to refer to Roman governors; it continues to see some use for various modern positions.

== Roman governors ==
Praeses began to be used as a generic description for provincial governors—often through paraphrases, such as qui praeest ("he who presides")—already since the early Principate, but came in general use under the Nerva–Antonine dynasty. The jurist Aemilius Macer, who wrote at the time of Caracalla (reigned 198–217), insists that the term was applied only to the governors who were also senators—thereby excluding the equestrian procuratores—but, while this may reflect earlier usage, it was certainly no longer the case by the time he wrote. In the usage of the 2nd and 3rd centuries, the term appears originally to have been used as an honorific, affixed to the formal gubernatorial titles (legatus Augusti etc.), and even, occasionally, for legion commanders or fiscal procuratores. By the mid-3rd century, however, praeses had become an official term, including for equestrian officials. The form [procurator] vice praesidis had also come into common use for equestrian procuratores entrusted with the governance of provinces in the absence of, or in lieu of, the regular (senatorial) governor. This marks a decisive step in the assumption of full provincial governorships by equestrians, with the first equestrian praesides provinciae appearing in the 270s.

This evolution was formalized in the reforms of Diocletian (r. 284–305) and Constantine the Great (r. 306–337), when the term praeses came to designate a specific class of provincial governors, the lowest after the consulares and the correctores. In the East, however, they ranked between the two other classes, possibly because the few correctores there were instituted after the praesides. The term praeses remained in general use for provincial governors, and was still used in legal parlance to designate all classes of provincial governors collectively. In common usage, the praesides were often also designated by more generic titles such as iudex ("judge"), rector or moderator, and sometimes archaically as praetor. In Greek, the term was rendered as ἡγεμὼν (hegemon).

Most of the provinces ("diocese") created by Diocletian by splitting the larger older ones were entrusted to such praesides, and they form the most numerous group of governors in the late-4th century Notitia Dignitatum:

in thirty-one provinces in the Western Roman Empire

- four in the Diocese of Illyricum: Dalmatia, Pannonia Prima, Noricum Mediterraneum, Noricum Ripense
- seven in Italy: Alpes Cottiae, Rhaetia Prima and Secunda, Samnium, Valeria, Corsica et Sardinia.
- two in the Diocese of Africa: Mauretania Sitifensis, Tripolitana
- four in Diocese of the Spains (Iberia and opposite African coast): Tarraconensis, Carthaginensis, Insulae Baleares, Mauretania Tingitana
- eleven in the Diocese of the Gauls: Alpes Maritimae, Alpes Poenninae et Graiae, Maxima Sequanorum, Aquitanica Prima and Secunda, Novempopulania, Narbonensis Prima and Secunda, Lugdunensis Secunda, Tertia and Senonica
- three in the Diocese of Britain: Britannia Prima and Secunda, Flavia Caesariensis.

in forty provinces in the Eastern Roman Empire

- five in the Diocese of Egypt: Libya Superior and Inferior, Thebais, Ægyptus, Arcadia.
- eight in the Diocese of the East: Palaestina Salutaris and Secunda, Phoenice Libanensis, Euphratensis, Syria Salutaris, Osrhoene, Mesopotamia, Cilicia Secunda
- seven in the Diocese of Asia: Pisidia, Lycaonia, Phrygia Pacatiana and Phrygia Salutaris, Lycia, Caria, Insulae.
- eight in the Diocese of Pontus: Honorias, Cappadocia Prima and Secunda, Helenopontus, Pontus Polemoniacus, Armenia Prima and Armenia Secunda, Galatia Salutaris.
- four in the Diocese of Thrace: Haemimontus, Rhodope, Moesia Secunda, Scythia
- four in the Diocese of Dacia: Dacia Ripensis, Moesia Prima, Praevalitana, Dardania
- four in the Diocese of Macedonia: Thessalia, Epirus Vetus and Epirus Nova, Macedonia Salutaris.

In the East, the staff (officium) of the praeses (attested for Thebais) comprised the same as that of a consularis, i.e. a princeps officii, cornicularius, commentariensis, adiutor, numerarius, ab actis, a libellis, subadiuva; finally unspecified exceptores and cohortalini (menial staff). In the West (attested for Dalmatia), the officium was again the same as with the consulares and correctores, comprising the princeps officii, cornicularius, two tabularii, commentariensis, adiutor, ab actis, subadiuva, and the usual exceptores and cohortalini.

The status of a praeses could also be awarded as a separate honour, ex praeside, attached to the rank of vir perfectissimus.

== German advisors ==
In German academia a doctoral advisor is called the Doktorvater. However, in the 18th century and before, the doctoral system was quite different. Instead of a Doktorvater as such, the candidate had a praeses to act as mentor and who would also head the oral viva voce exam. In the 18th century the praeses often chose the subject and compiled the theses and the candidate had only to defend. Sometimes there were several candidates at the same time defending the same thesis, in order to save time.

== Modern uses ==
The chair of a student society in the Netherlands or Belgium may be called a praeses; in Dutch the official spelling has changed to "preses" but most student societies still observe the Latin spelling. Various minor offices may be designated by a compound title, e.g. dooppraeses in charge of initiation and associated hazing.

In modern Italian the word "preside" is still used to indicate the head teacher of a primary or secondary school, generally equivalent to the American principal or the British headmaster positions.

In Norway, the office of archbishop has been abolished. Instead, the Lutheran Church of Norway has a Bishops Conference which is presided over by a praeses.

In Sweden, the chair of academic institutions and disputations, as well as the bishop of Cathedral chapters, is called preses.

The church bodies of the Evangelical Church in the Rhineland and Evangelical Church of Westphalia, in which the title and function of bishop are unknown, are also chaired by a praeses (German: Präses, plural: Präsides).

In other German church bodies, the title usually refers to the president of the synod.

In Indonesia's Batak Christian Protestant Church, which emerged from German evangelization efforts, a praeses chairs over each of the church's 32 ecclesiastical districts

Roman Catholic religious institutions, especially Franciscan ones, use the term to indicate the presiding officer of a collegial meeting of the order.

The official Scots title of the Presiding Officer of the Scottish Parliament is Preses o the Scots Pairlament.

The Polish word prezes, derived from Latin praeses means chairman.
