= Justiniana Prima =

Coordinates: 42°57′11.69″N 21°40′11.90″E

Julijana Prima
- Julijana Прима (Serbian); Царичин Град (Serbian)
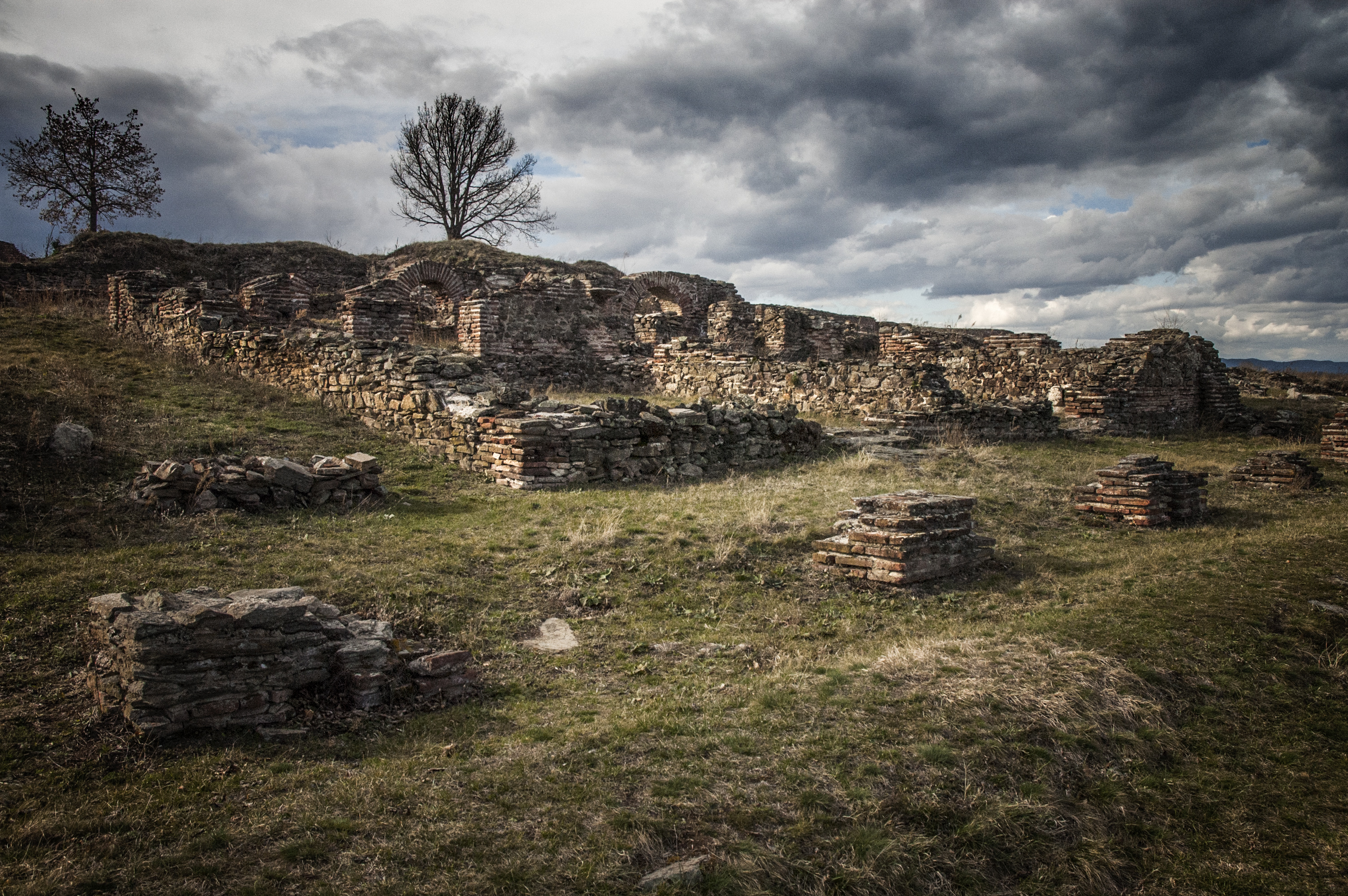
- Remnants of the city
- Interactive map of Julijana Prima

History
- Founded: 535 AD
- Built for: Archbishopric, Imperial estate
- Demolished: 615 AD

Site notes
- Restored: Partially in the 1930s

Cultural Heritage of Serbia
- Type: Archeological Site of Exceptional Importance
- Designated: 12 February 1949
- Reference no.: AN 24

Justiniana Prima (Latin: Iustiniana Prima; Greek: Ιουστινιανή Πρώτη; Serbian: Јустинијана Прима, romanized: Justinijana Prima) was an Eastern Roman city that existed from 535 to 615 CE, near modern Lebane in the Leskovac region, Serbia. It is currently an archaeological site. Founded by Emperor Justinian I (527-565), it was the metropolitan seat of the newly founded Archbishopric of Justiniana Prima, which became the main church administrative body of the central Dardania with jurisdiction from Praevalitana to Dacia Ripensis. Justinian Prima was originally designed to become the capital of the prefecture of Illyricum, but for reasons likely related with its status near the Roman frontiers of the 6th century CE, Thessaloniki was preferred. It was abandoned less than 100 years after its foundation.

In 1979, the archaeological site of Justiniana Prima, identified with Caričin Grad, was added to the Archaeological Sites of Exceptional Importance-list under official protected status by the Republic of Serbia.

== History ==
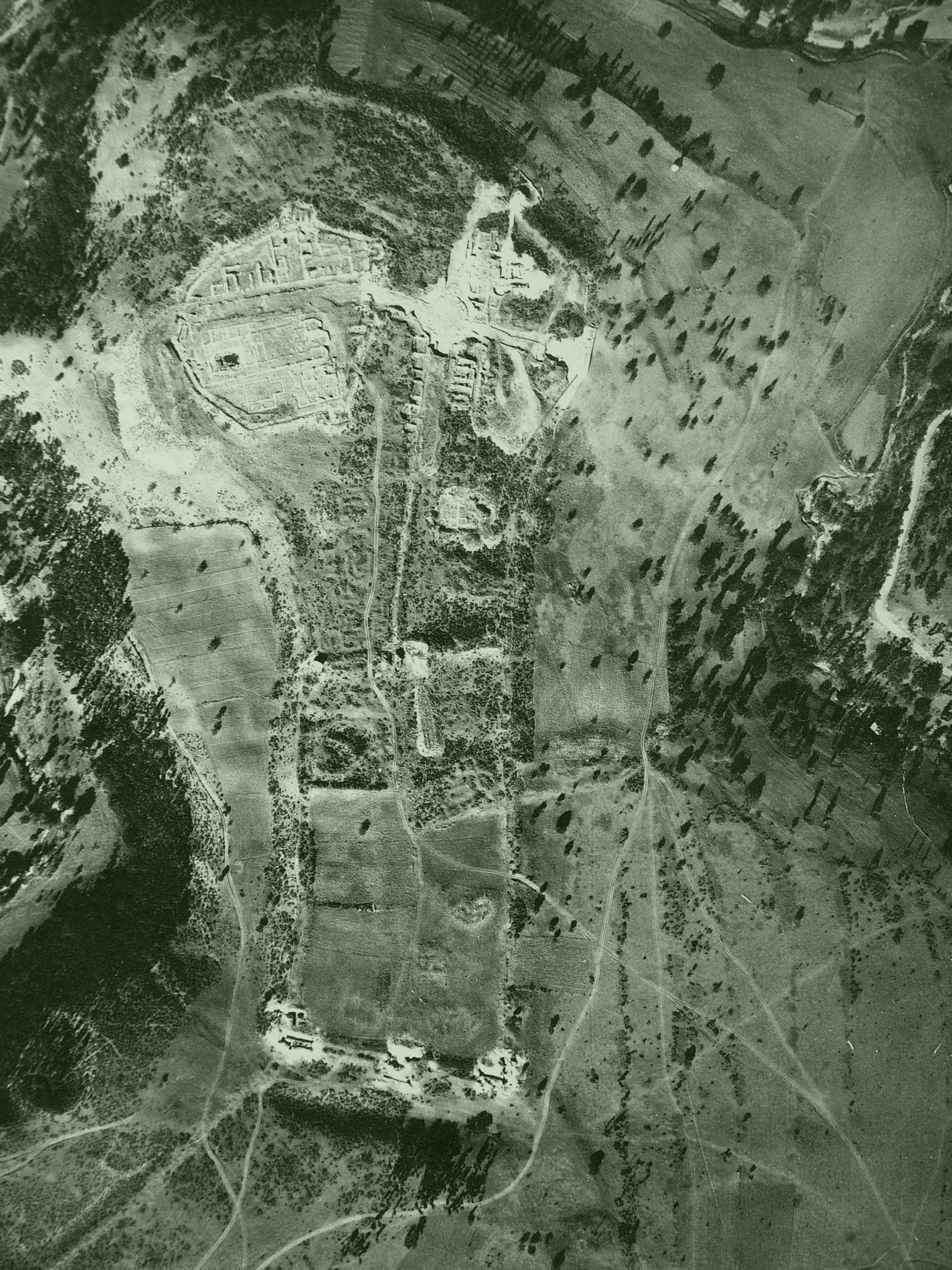
Aeroimage in 1937. Photo archive of the Military Geographical Institute of Serbia

Justiniana Prima was founded by Emperor Justinian I in 535. Built on the site of Tauresium, a remote village, it existed until 615 and was designed as the seat of the Archbishopric of Justiniana Prima. The arch-priest of the Illyrians ('Ιλλυριών άρχιερεύς) seated in Justinian Prima had jurisdiction over Dacia Ripensis, Dacia Mediterranea, northern Moesia Superior, Dardania, Macedonia Salutaris (was omitted in 545, in the Novella 13), Praevalitana and the territory of Bassianae in Pannonia Secunda.

The establishment of the Archbishopric is mentioned in Justinian's own Novel XI from 535, when he promotes the Metropolitan to an archbishop, independent from the Archbishop of Thessalonica. The establishment is seen as part of the feud between Justinian and the Archbishop of Eastern Illyricum, who was a papal vicar.

The city was to become capital of Illyricum, but Thessaloniki was preferred and Justinian Prima received jurisdiction over the territories of the Diocese of Dacia. Still, the new foundation was not without importance and Justinian made sure that this city, which was one of his favourite projects, received all the necessary support. In 545 Justinian issued another law underlining the episcopal rights and status of Justiniana Prima, which is also confirmed by letters that were exchanged between Justinian and Pope Gregory I at the end of the 6th century.

The city planning combined classical and Christian elements: thermae, a levantine agorai, and streets with colonnades. Typical Eastern Mediterranean features went along with numerous churches. Procopius, in his The Buildings, describes the city as follows:

He therefore built a wall of small compass about this place in the form of a square, placing a tower at each corner, and caused it to be called, as it actually is, Tetrapyrgia. And close by this place he built a very notable city which he named Justiniana Prima, thus paying a debt of gratitude to the home that fostered him. In that place also he constructed an aqueduct and so caused the city to be abundantly supplied with ever-running water. And many other enterprises were carried out by the founder of this city - works of great size and worthy of especial note. For to enumerate the churches is not easy, and it is impossible to tell in words of the lodgings for magistrates, the great stoas, the fine marketplaces, the fountains, the streets, the baths, the shops. In brief, the city is both great and populous and blessed in every way.

The town was abandoned at around 615. Invading Avars coming from north of the Danube may be one factor, missing political interest in the town after the time of Justinian may be another. Among many other imported finds the presence of 2 pieces of a specific type of fibulae and handmade pottery have been understood as an indication of the presence of Slavs already before the Avar incursion (584).

== Archaeological site ==
The huge correlation between the archaeological site and the description by Procopius as well as finds of seals of the archbishop of Iustiniana Prima have determined the identification of Justiniana Prima with Caričin Grad. The archaeological site was first discovered in 1912 by Vladimir Petković. There have been archaeological excavations for nearly 100 years with the participation of French and more recently also German researchers. There is a permanent exhibition in the national museum in Leskovac. At the site itself monuments there are impressive remains of the fortification, the acropolis as well as of several churches and many other buildings. Justiniana Prima is on UNESCO’s preliminary list of World Heritage Sites.

== See also ==
- Archbishopric of Justiniana Prima
- Praetorian prefecture of Illyricum
- Archaeological Sites of Exceptional Importance (Serbia)

== Sources ==
- Bavant, Bernard; Kondić, Vladimir; Spieser, Jean-Michel, eds. (1990). Caričin Grad II: Le quartier sud-ouest de la ville haute. Vol. 2. Belgrade; Rome: Institute archéologique de Belgrade; Ecole française de Rome.
- Bavant, Bernard; Ivanišević, Vujadin, eds. (2019). Caričin Grad IV: Catalogue des objets des fouilles anciennes et autres études. Vol. 4. Belgrade; Rome: Institute archéologique de Belgrade; Ecole française de Rome.
- Bulić, Dejan (2013). "The Fortifications of the Late Antiquity and the Early Byzantine Period on the Later Territory of the South-Slavic Principalities, and their re-occupation". The World of the Slavs: Studies of the East, West and South Slavs: Civitas, Oppidas, Villas and Archeological Evidence (7th to 11th Centuries AD). Belgrade: The Institute for History. pp. 137–234. ISBN 978-86-7743-104-4.
- Curta, Florin (2001). The Making of the Slavs: History and Archaeology of the Lower Danube Region, c. 500–700. Cambridge: Cambridge University Press. ISBN 978-1-139-42888-0.
- Curta, Florin (2002). "Limes and Cross: the Religious Dimension of the Sixth-century Danube Frontier of the Early Byzantine Empire". Старинар. 51 (2001): 45–70.
- Curta, Florin (2006). Southeastern Europe in the Middle Ages, 500–1250. Cambridge: Cambridge University Press. ISBN 978-0-521-81539-0.
- Duval, Noël; Popović, Vladislav, eds. (1984). Caričin Grad I: Les basiliques B et J de Caričin Grad: Quatre objets remarquables de Caričin Grad: Le trésor de Hajdučka Vodenica. Vol. 1. Belgrade; Rome: Institute archéologique de Belgrade; Ecole française de Rome.
- Duval, Noël; Popović, Vladislav, eds. (2010). Caričin Grad III: L'acropole et ses monuments (cathédrale, baptistère et bâtiments annexes). Vol. 3. Belgrade; Rome: Institute archéologique de Belgrade; Ecole française de Rome. Archived from the original on 2020-09-02.
- Hendrik W. Dey (2014). The Afterlife of the Roman City. Cambridge University Press. ISBN 978-1-107-06918-3.
- J. A. S. Evans (2002). The Age of Justinian: The Circumstances of Imperial Power, pp 96–97, 189, 227-228. ISBN 978-1-134-55976-3.
- Joachim Henning (2007). Post-Roman Towns, Trade and Settlement in Europe and Byzantium: Byzantium, Pliska, and the Balkans. Walter de Gruyter. ISBN 978-3-11-018358-0.
- Ivanišević, Vujadin (2012). "Barbarian Settlements in the Interior of Illyricum: The Case of Caričin Grad". The Pontic-Danubian Realm in the Period of the Great Migration. Paris: Centre de recherche dćhistoire et civilisation de Byzance. pp. 57–69.
- Ivanišević, Vujadin; Stamenković, Sonja (2014). "Late Roman fortifications in the Leskovac basin in relation to urban centres" (PDF). Старинар. 64: 219–230.
- Ivanišević, Vujadin (2016). "Caričin Grad (Justiniana Prima): A New-Discovered City for a 'New' Society" (PDF). Proceedings of the 23rd International Congress of Byzantine Studies: Plenary Papers. Belgrade: The Serbian National Committee of AIEB. pp. 107–126.
- Ivanišević, Vujadin; Bugarski, Ivan; Stamenković, Aleksandar (2019). "The Outer Forts of Caričin Grad: Visualisation of Digital Terrain Models and Interpretation" (PDF). Старинар. 69: 297–316.
- Janković, Đorđe (2004). "The Slavs in the 6th Century North Illyricum". Гласник Српског археолошког друштва. 20: 39–61.
- A. D. Lee (2013). From Rome to Byzantium AD 363 to 565: The Transformation of Ancient Rome. Edinburgh University Press. ISBN 978-0-7486-6835-9.
- Meyendorff, John (1989). Imperial unity and Christian divisions: The Church 450-680 A.D. Crestwood, NY: St. Vladimir's Seminary Press. ISBN 978-0-88141-055-6.
- Mócsy, András (2014) [1974]. Pannonia and Upper Moesia: A History of the Middle Danube Provinces of the Roman Empire. New York: Routledge. ISBN 978-1-317-75425-1.
- Ognjević, Tamara (2008). "The Shepherd as personification of Ruler and Priest: An iconographical analysis of a scene from an early-Byzantine floor mosaic in the southern basilica of Caričin Grad" (PDF). Niš and Byzantium. 6: 127–148.
- Petrović, Vladimir P. (2007). "Pre-Roman and Roman Dardania: Historical and Geographical Considerations" (PDF). Balcanica. 37. Balkanološki institut SANU: 7–23.
- Popović, Radomir V. (1996). Le Christianisme sur le sol de l'Illyricum oriental jusqu'à l'arrivée des Slaves. Thessaloniki: Institute for Balkan Studies. ISBN 978-960-7387-10-3.
- John Rich (2002). The City in Late Antiquity. Routledge. ISBN 978-1-134-76136-4.
- Sarantis, Alexander (2016). Justinian's Balkan Wars: Campaigning, Diplomacy and Development in Illyricum, Thrace and the Northern World A.D. 527-65. Prenton: Francis Cairns Publications Ltd. ISBN 978-0-905205-58-8.
- Sarris, Peter (2006). Economy and Society in the Age of Justinian. Cambridge: Cambridge University Press. ISBN 978-1-139-45904-4.
- Snively, Carolyn S. (2005). "Dacia Mediterranea and Macedonia Secunda in the Sixth Century: A Question of Influence on Church Architecture" (PDF). Niš and Byzantium. 3: 213–224.
- Turlej, Stanisław (2016). Justiniana Prima: An Underestimated Aspect of Justinian's Church Policy. Krakow: Jagiellonian University Press. ISBN 978-83-233-9556-0.
- Zeiller, Jacques (1918). Les origines chrétiennes dans les provinces danubiennes de l'Empire romain. Paris: E. De Boccard.
