= Ratiaria =

Ancient roman city in Bulgaria

Coordinates: 43°49′01″N 22°54′28″E

The northern Balkans, including Ratiaria in Dacia Ripensis, in the 6th century

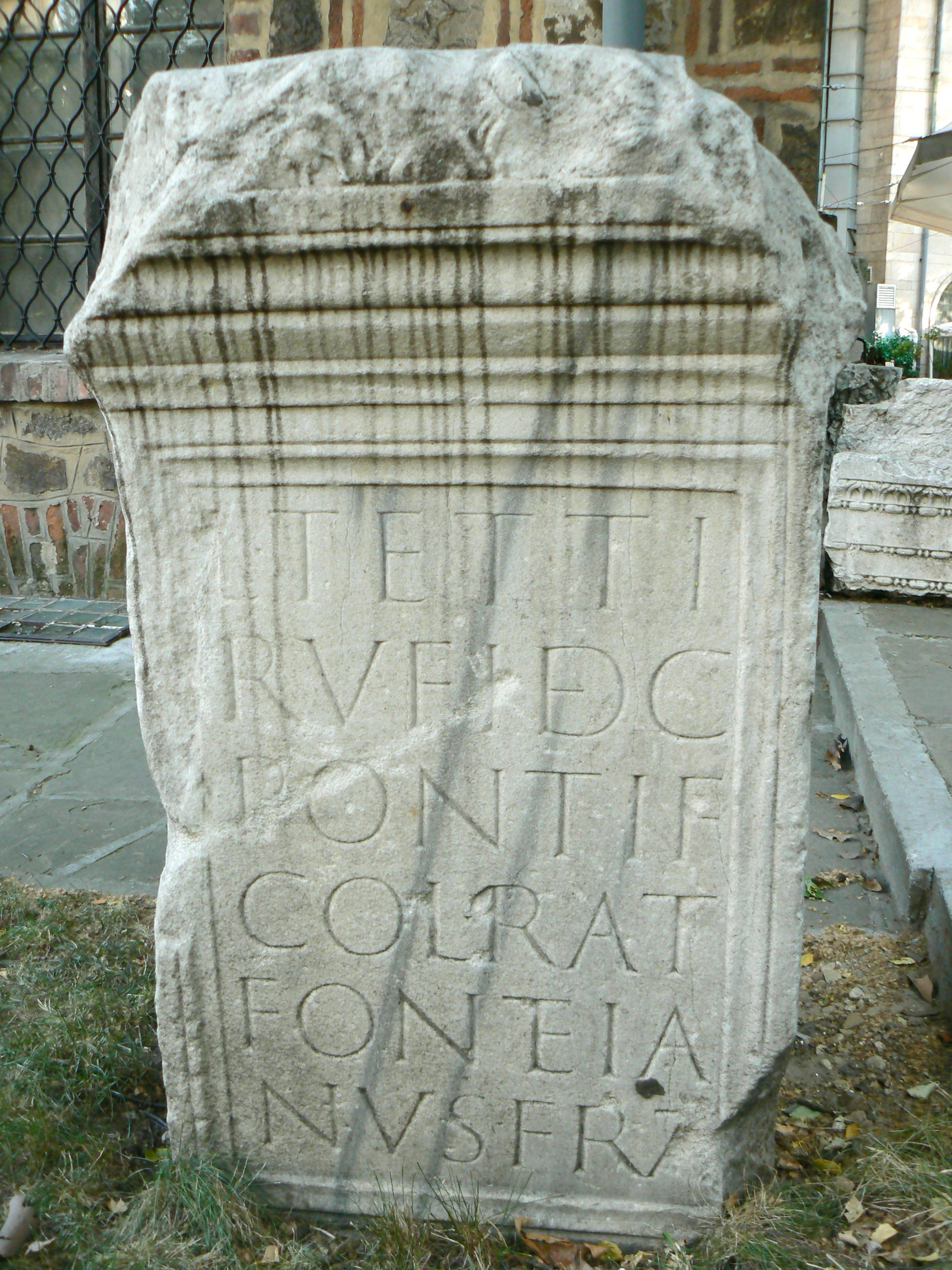
A grave stone with the inscription about Tettius Rufus, a Decurion and Pontiff of the Roman colony Ratiaria; currently kept at the National Archaeological Institute and Museum, Sofia. The Latin inscription reads: D (is) M (Anibus) / L (uci) Tetti / Rufi dec (urionis) / Pontif (ICIS) / col (onia) Council (Iaria) / Fonteia / nus frat (s)

Ratiaria (or: Ratsaria, Raetiaria, Retiaria, Reciaria, Razaria; Bulgarian: Рациария; Greek: Ραζαρία μητρόπολις;) was an ancient Roman city along the river Danube. A Roman colony was established there, called Colonia Ulpia Traiana Ratiaria.

It is located 2 km west of the present village of Archar in Vidin Province, northwestern Bulgaria and 3 km east of the present Balta Neagră Natural Reserve in southern Romania. The closest modern cities are Vidin (27 km to the north west), Lom (28 km to the east) in Bulgaria and Calafat (41 km to the north) in Romania.

An archaeological museum for the site has recently been established in Dimovo.

== History ==
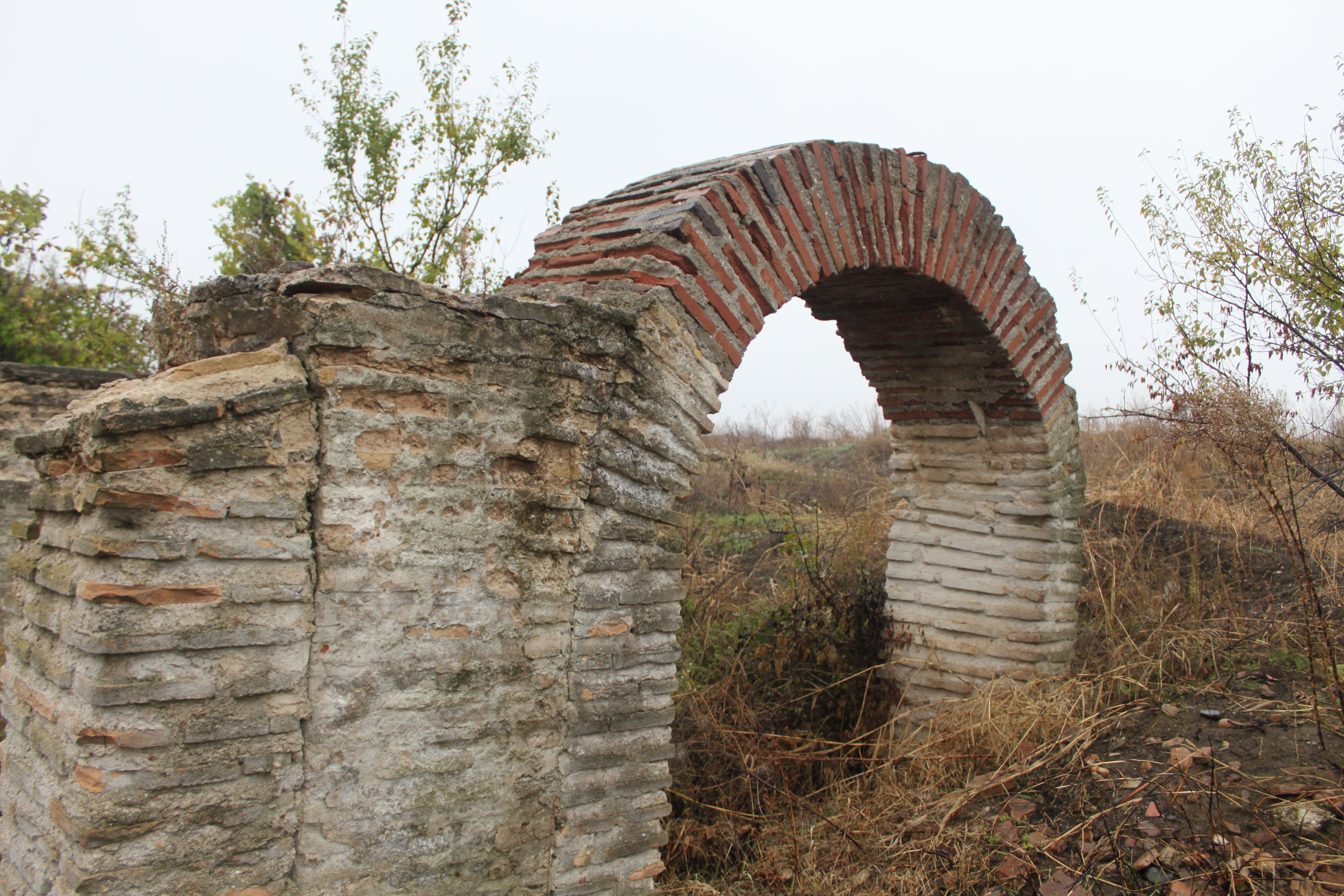
Governor's residence, Ratiaria

Ratiaria was conquered by the Dacians of Burebista and later by the Romans. There was a gold mine in the city, which was exploited by the Thracians. The city may have owed its success to the goldsmiths.

The earliest involvement of the Romans occurred in 75 BC when Gaius Scribonius Curio, prefect of Macedonia, entered this territory to ward off the Scordisci, the Dardani and the Dacians.

In 29 BC, Marcus Licinius Crassus, the grandson of the triumvir, fought the Triballi here. Ratiaria was a fortified city by this point.

It was not until the principate of Augustus that the Romans conquered the region, which was organised into a province named Moesia. In 33/34 AD Tiberius built the road linking the Danube forts including Viminacium and Ratiaria. The city was less important than the nearby Sirmium, Viminacium and Naissus, but its legionary fortress for Legio IV Flavia Felix on the Danubian Limes together with the fleet of the Classis Moesica under Vespasian made it a key station. After the division of Moesia in 86 AD, the city became the capital of Upper Moesia.

Legio IV Flavia Felix was based here at least until the conquest of Dacia (101-106 AD) when the castrum was abandoned and the settlement became a colonia within Moesia Superior named Colonia Ulpia Traiana Ratiaria (107 AD) after its founder the Emperor Trajan. In the 2nd and 3rd centuries Ratiaria became prosperous as a trade centre and customs port.

A number of Roman patricians (aristocrats) lived in Ratiaria, while the nearby Bononia (today's Vidin) was home to a small military unit.

With the definitive abandonment of Dacia Traiana by Aurelian in 271, the old castra in the region were reopened.

It is unclear whether Aurelian or the Emperor Diocletian replaced Dacia Aureliana with two provinces, but by 285, there were two: – Dacia Mediterranea with its capital at Serdica (Sofia) and Dacia Ripensis with its capital at Ratiaria. As the capital of the new province Ratiaria served both as the seat of the military governor (or dux) and as the military base for the Roman legion XIII Gemina.

Later these two new Dacias along with Dardania, Moesia Inferior and Praevalitana constituted the Diocese of Dacia. An important bishop's cathedra was established in the town in the 4th century AD.

The city became an important Christian centre in the 4th century and several bishops are recorded. Palladius of Ratiaria, an Arian Christian theologian, lived here in the late 4th century.

In 440 or 441 the Huns sacked Ratiaria. Rebuilding works were done under Anastasius I, celebrated in the new town's name, Anastasiana Ratiaria. Priscus calls it a prosperous city in the 5th century.

In AD 586 the town was sacked by the Avars.

Archaeological excavations of the site began in 1958 and have continued sporadically since then.

== Archaeology ==
Investigative journalist Ivan Dikov states that only a small part of the site, which was excavated in the 1980s by a Bulgarian-Italian mission, is left unexplored and unattended. Dikov continues to say that the remaining 20ha of the site has been illegally dug up by hand and machines and that the site is reduced to hills and craters. According to Dikov, local witnesses saw that at one point in the late 1990s, the site was split between the mayor, the police, local people and high-ranking people from Sofia. In the city, there are ruins of an audience hall with a mosaic of Oprheus, jewelry, and ancient coins.

Findings from Ratiaria, exhibited in Konaka History Museum, Vidin

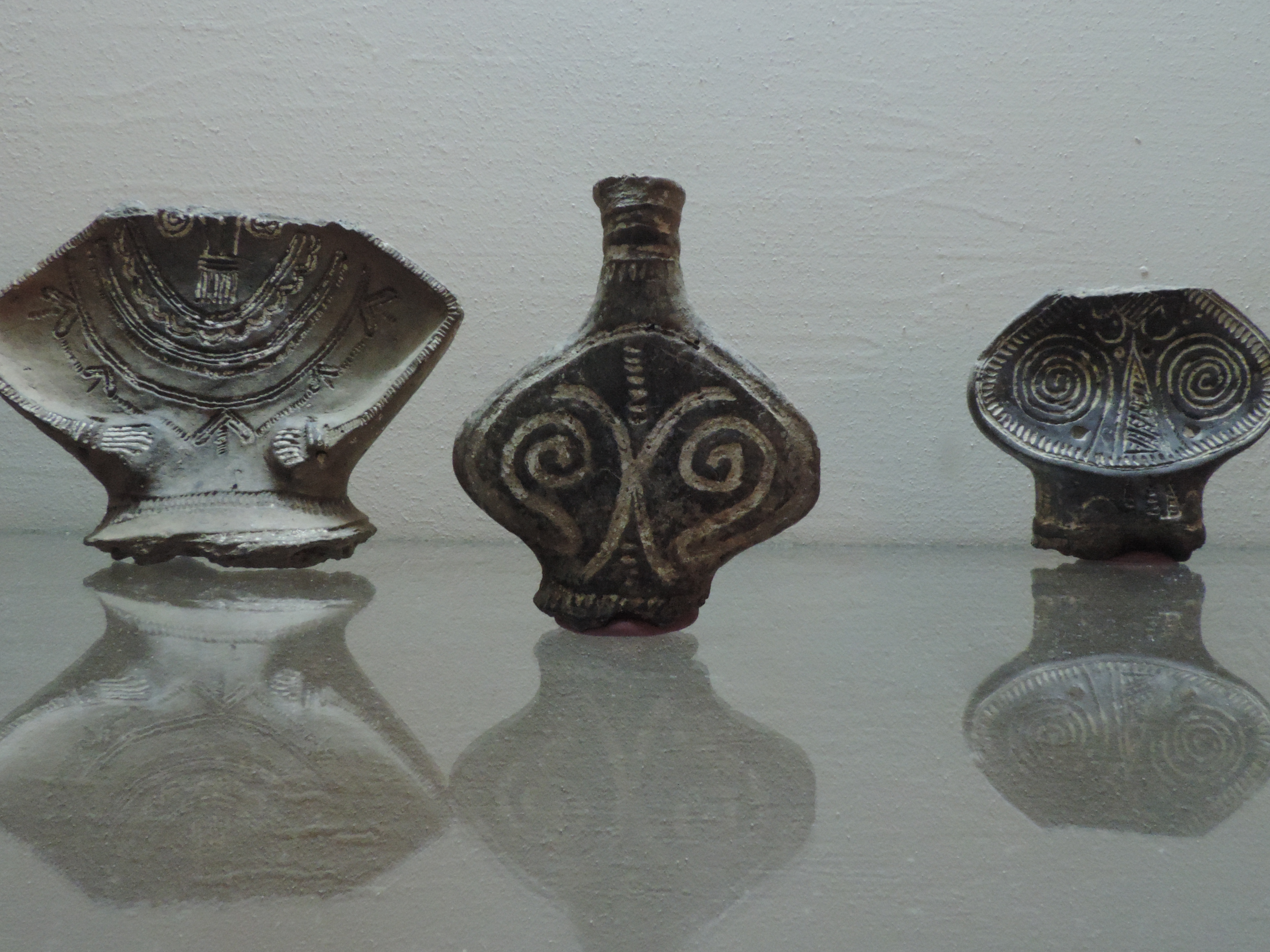

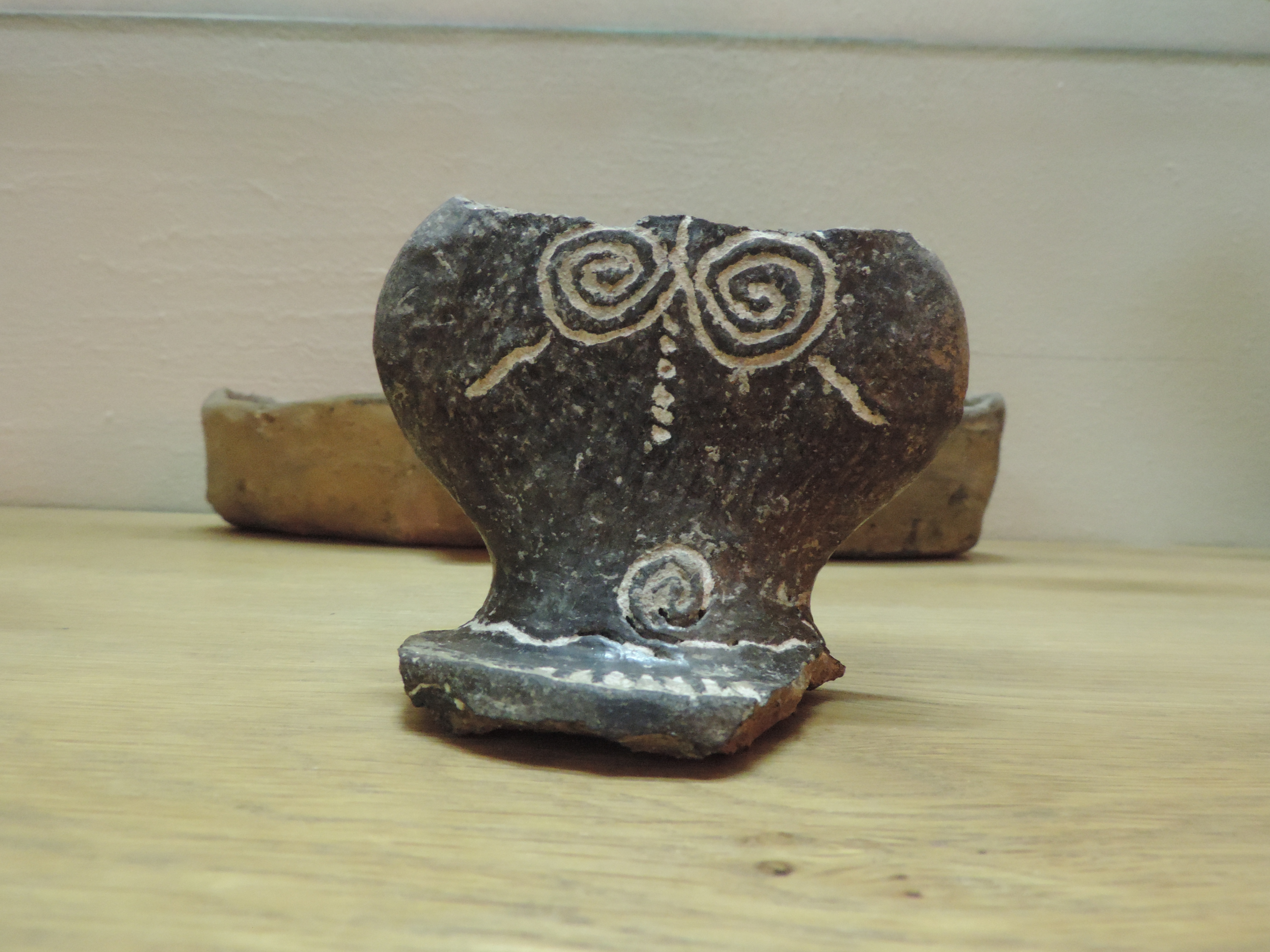

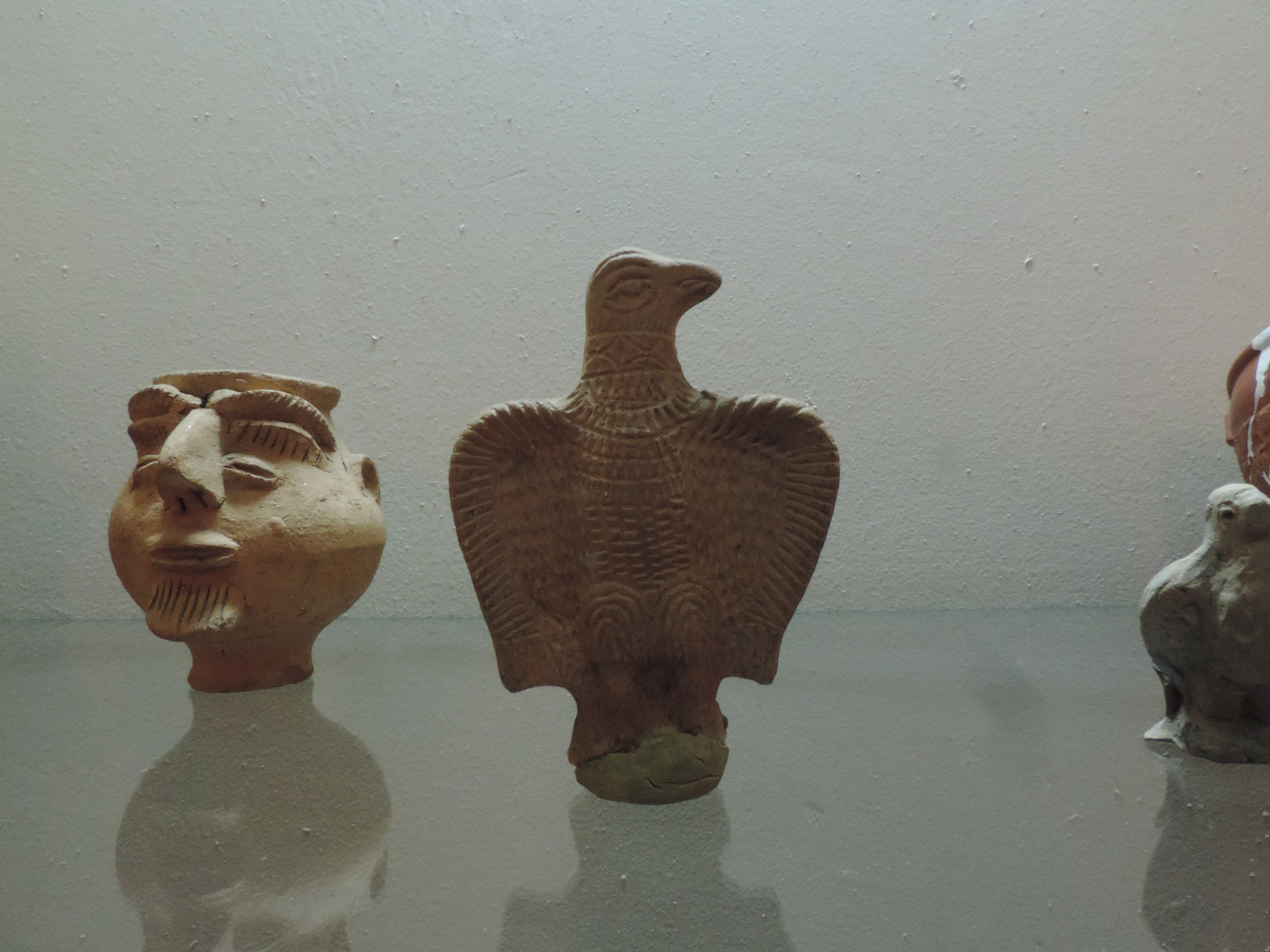

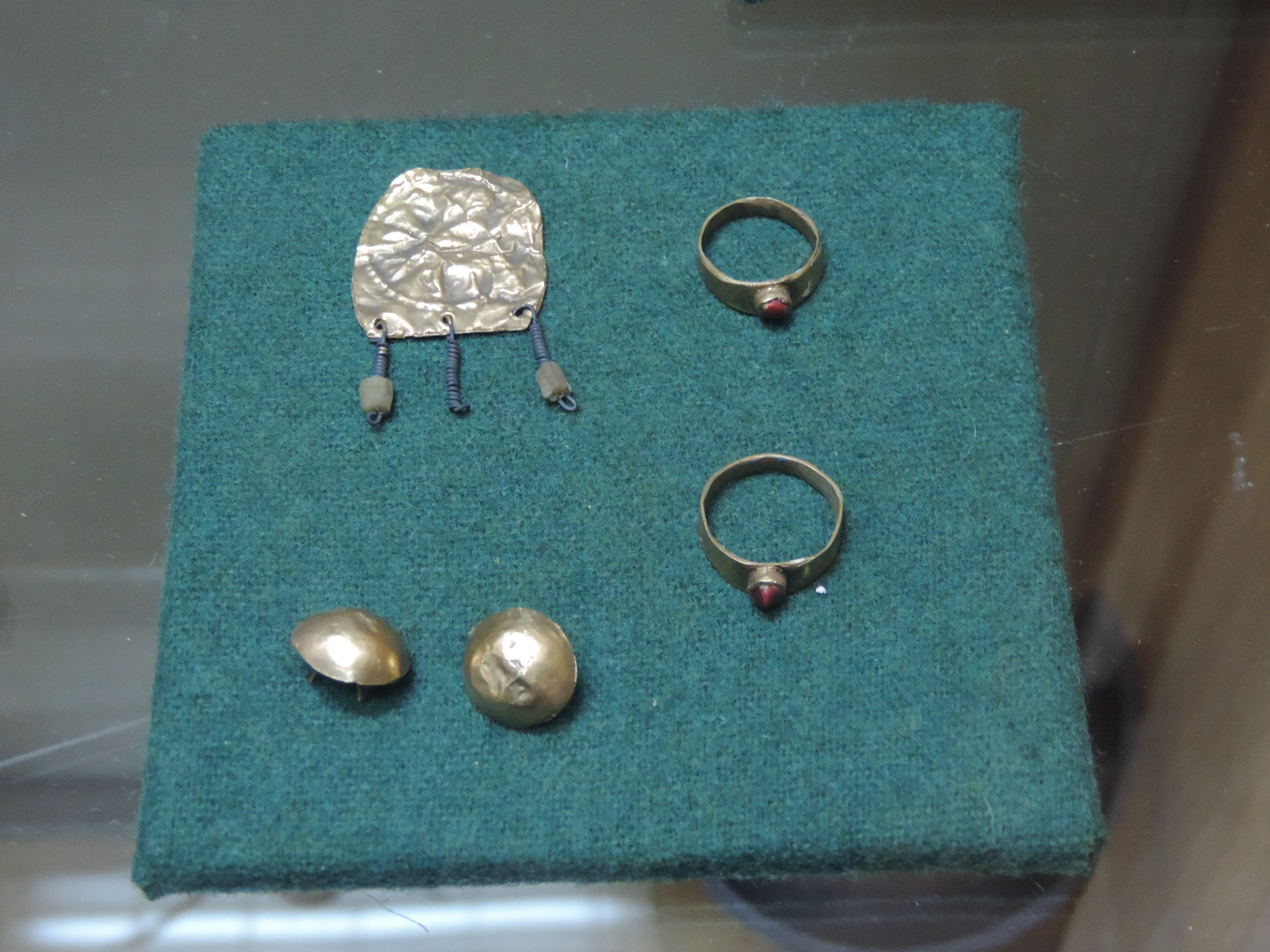

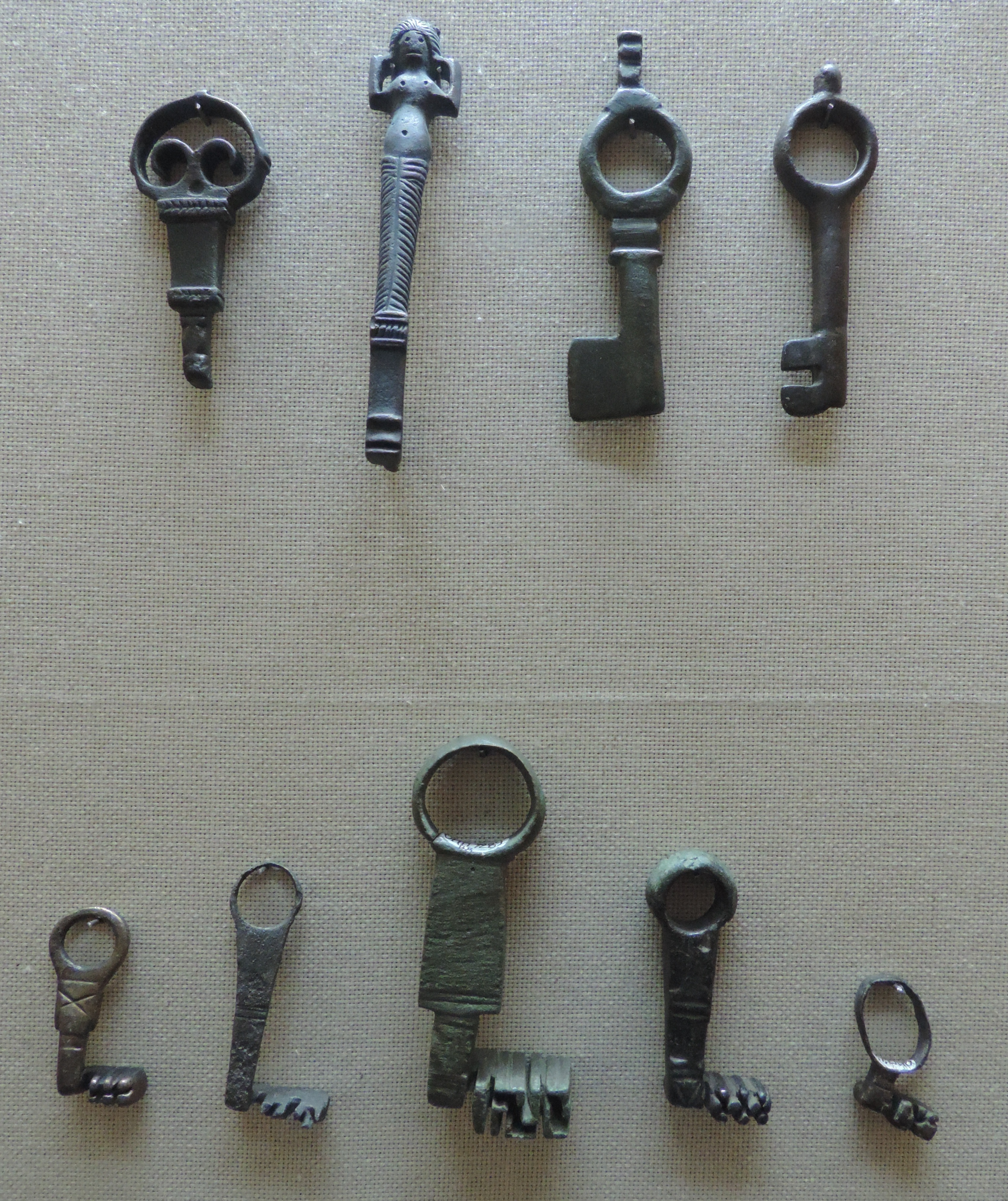

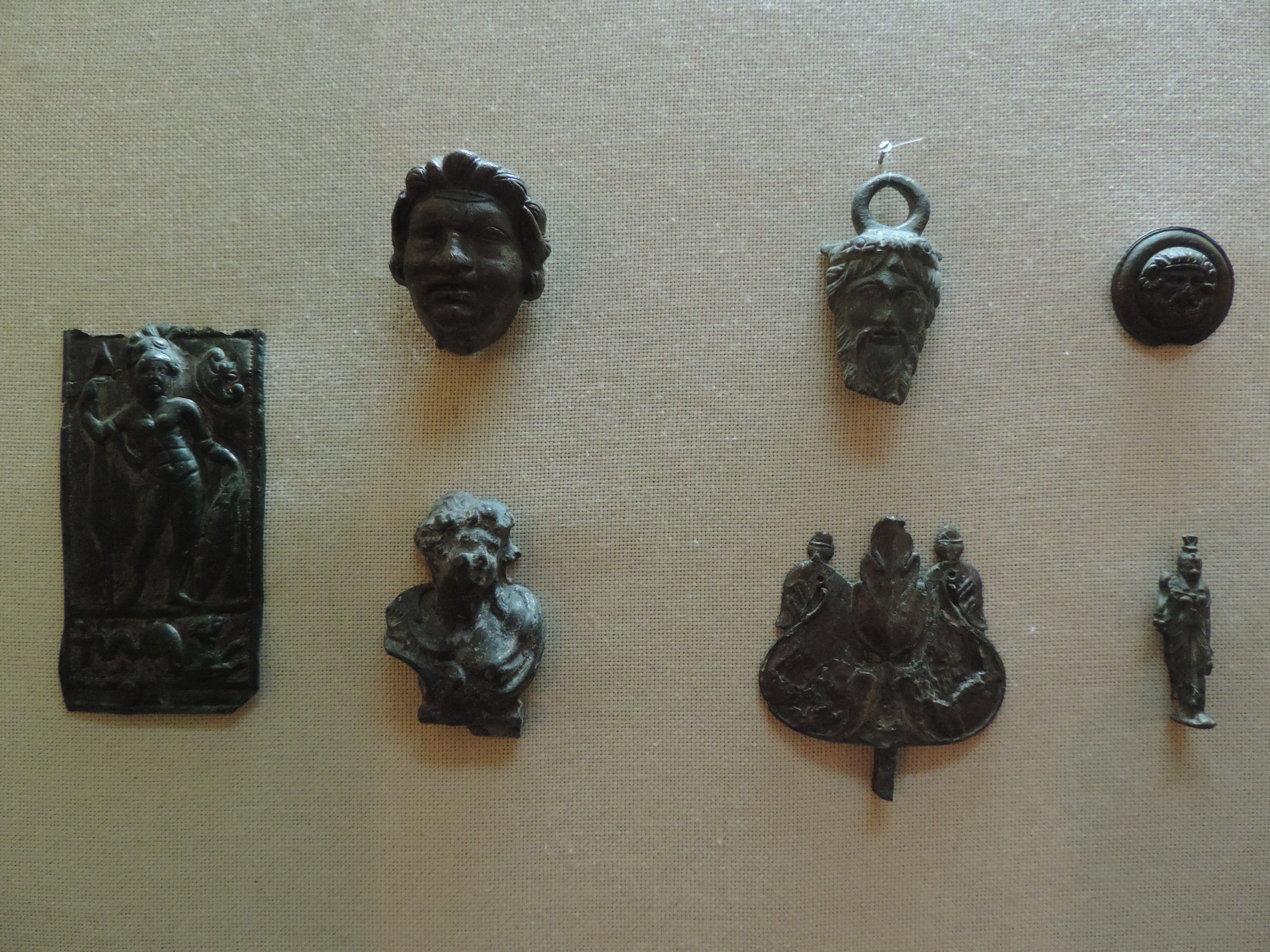

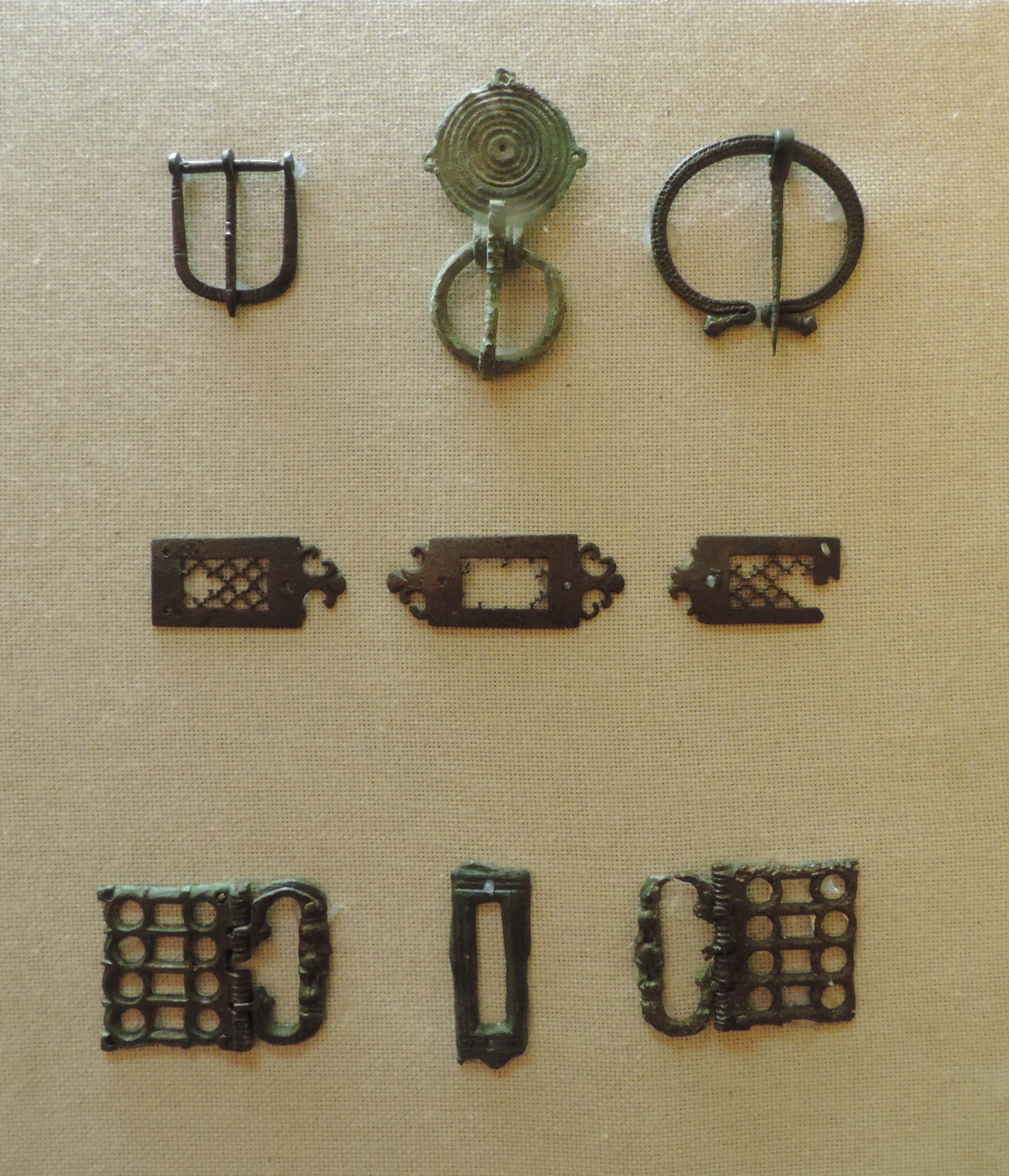

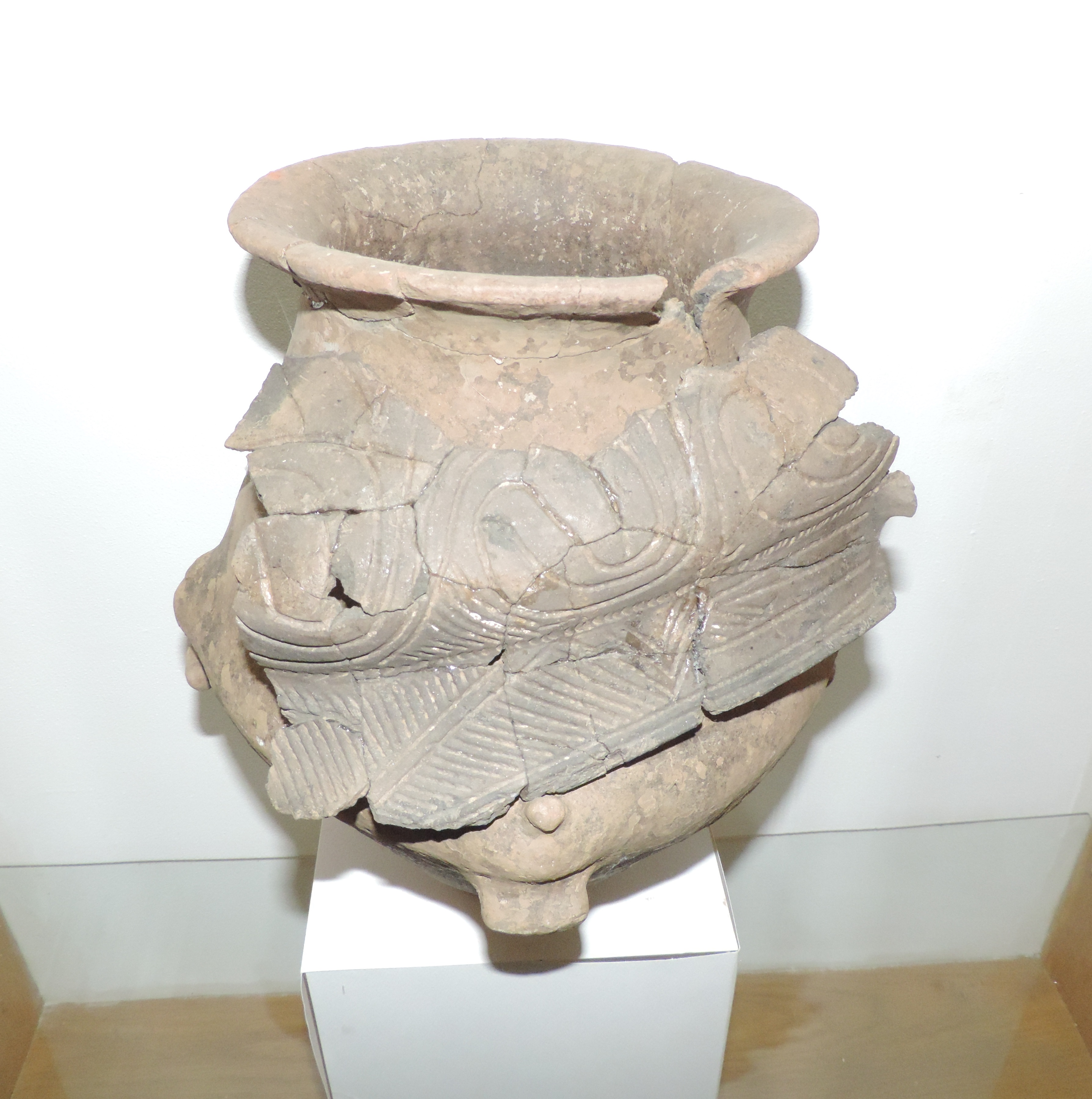

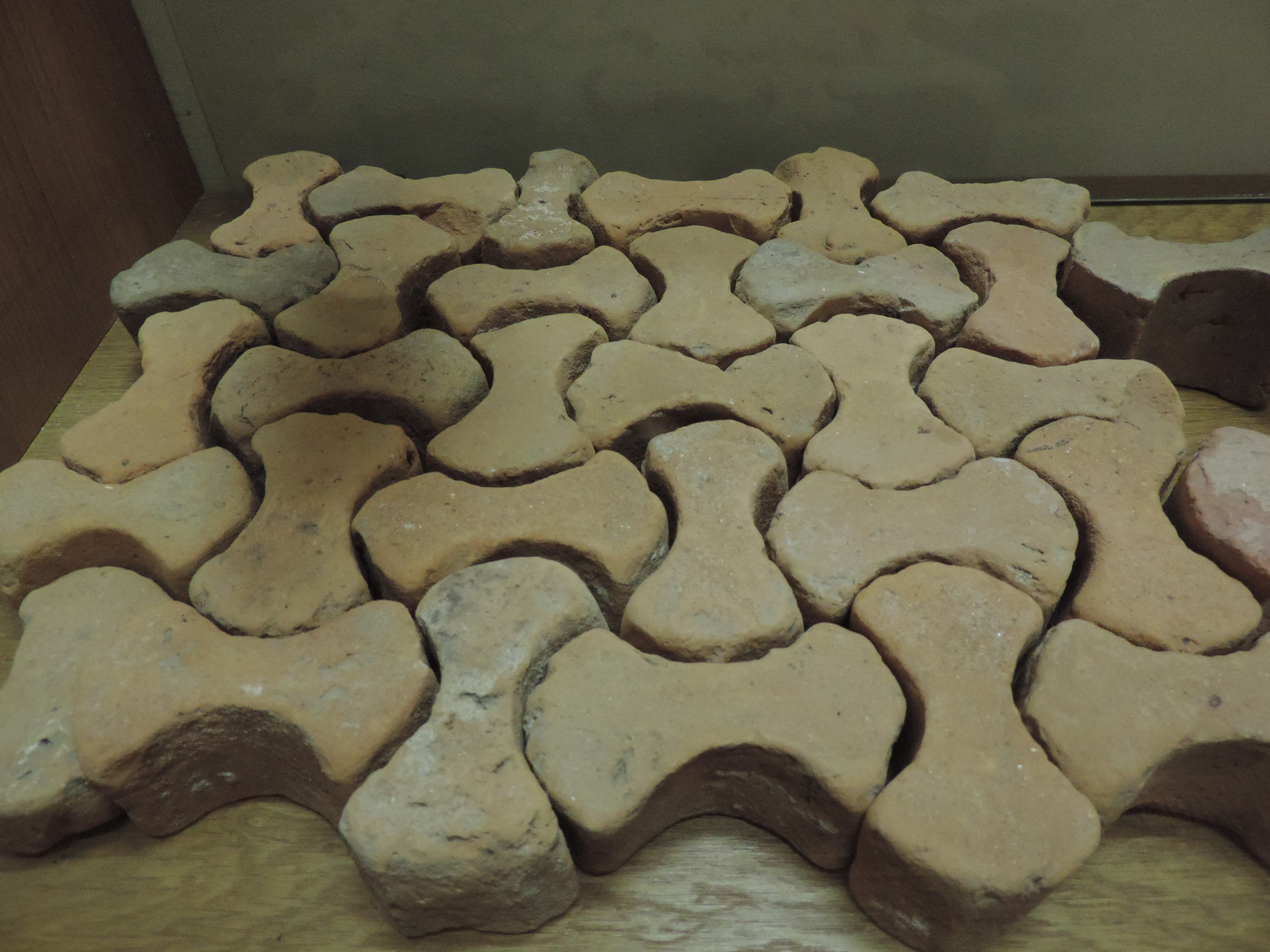

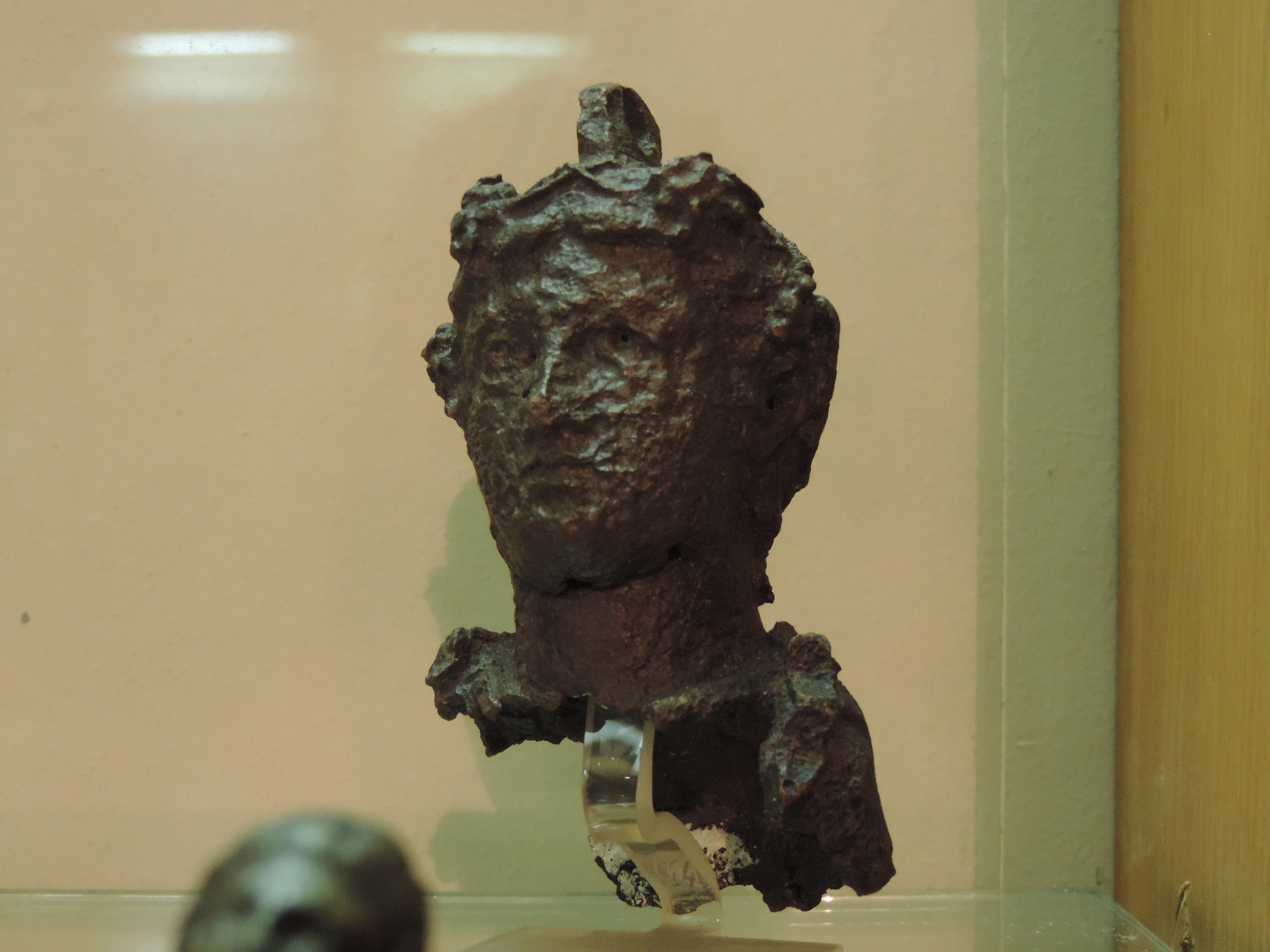

== Ecclesiastical history ==
As provincial capital of Dacia Ripensis, it also was the Metropolitan archdiocese. In 304 or 305, during the Great Persecution three Christian men named Jan, Aggaeus, and Gaius were executed in the city. Palladius, a bishop of the city, was a strong supporter of Arianism.

=== Titular see ===
The archdiocese was nominally restored in 1925 as a Latin Catholic titular archbishopric of the highest (Metropolitan) rank.

The incumbent is Kurian Mathew Vayalunkal, having the following previous incumbents:

- Gustave-Charles-Marie Mutel (민 아우구스티노), Paris Foreign Missions Society (M.E.P.) (11 January 1926 – 22 January 1933)
- Andrew Killian (11 July 1933 – 5 November 1934)
- Anselm Edward John Kenealy, Capuchin Franciscans (O.F.M. Cap.) (13 January 1936 – 8 December 1943)
- Nikolay Avtonomov (6 October 1945 – 13 August 1979)
- Marian Oleś (28 November 1987 – 24 May 2005)
- Kurian Mathew Vayalunkal (3 May 2016 – present )

== Famous locals ==
- Palladius of Ratiaria, late 4th century Arian Christian theologian

== See also ==
- Roman Dacia
- Dacia
- List of ancient cities in Thrace and Dacia

== Sources and external links ==
- Bulgarian Archaeological Association - Excavations at Ratiaria
- GigaCatholic, with titular incumbent biography links
- Archaeological excavations of Ratiaria by the village of Archar
- Sarcophagus Ratiaria (Image)
