= Dacia Ripensis =

Province of the Roman Empire in the Balkans in Late Antiquity

Dacia Ripensis Provincia Dacia Ripensis Δακία Παραποτάμια (Greek)
- Province of Roman Empire
- c. 283 – 586
- The northern Balkans, including Dacia Ripensis, in the 6th century
- Capital: Ratiaria (now in Vidin Province, Bulgaria)
- History
  - Evacuation of Dacia Traiana, creation of Dacia Aureliana: 271
  - Dacia Aureliana partitioned: 280s (before 285)
  - Devastated by Avar invasion: 586
Preceded by	Succeeded by
Dacia Aureliana	Pannonian Avars

Dacia Ripensis (lit. 'riparian Dacia') was the name of a Roman province in the northern Balkan Peninsula, immediately south of the Middle Danube. Its capital was Ratiaria (modern Archar, Bulgaria). It was a district less urban than neighbouring Dacia Mediterranea and more militarized; "military camps and forts, rather than cities, were typical of the province". Besides Ratiaria, Oescus was the major settlement.

Dacia Ripensis was one of the "Two Dacias" established south of the Danube in the late 3rd century. The Roman emperor Aurelian (r. 270–275) abandoned the province of Roman Dacia established by Trajan (r. 98–117) in 106 AD on the northern bank of the river, and created the two new "Dacias" between the existing provinces of Moesia Prima (upstream) and Moesia Secunda (downstream). The northern part of Aurelian's Dacia Aureliana is attested as "Dacia Ripensis" in 343/4. The southern part, with its capital at Serdica (modern Sofia) was known as Dacia Mediterranea.

According to the Laterculus Veronensis, both provinces were part of the Diocese of Moesiae after the empire was divided into dioeceses during the reign of Constantine the Great (r. 306–337), but by the time of the Notitia Dignitatum they were part of the Diocese of Thrace. According to the Notitia, Dacia Ripensis was governed by a praeses, while the governor of Dacia Mediterranea was a more senior consularis. Dacia Ripensis was under the authority of the Praetorian prefecture of Illyricum.

Dacia Ripensis flourished in the mid-4th century, and some forts on the northern bank of the Danube were recovered by the Romans. In the 5th century Priscus described Ratiaria as large and densely populated. In the 6th century, Hierocles's Late Greek Synecdemus identifies Ratiera as the principal city of the province, calling the province Δακία Παραποτάμια, Dakía Parapotámia, 'Dacia-by-the-river', though Procopius referred to it as Ῥιπησία, Rhipēsía.

In 535, emperor Justinian I (527-565) created the Archbishopric of Justiniana Prima as a regional primacy with ecclesiastical jurisdiction over all provinces of the Diocese of Dacia, including the province of Dacia Ripensis.

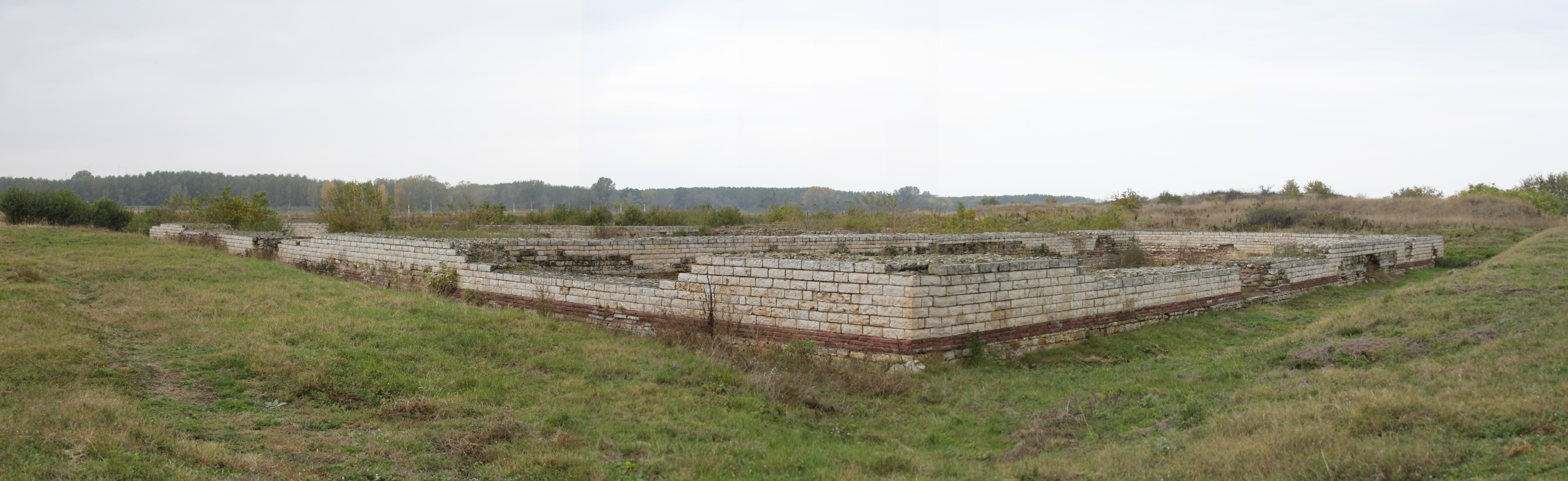
Excavated ruins of fortifications at Oescus (after restoration)

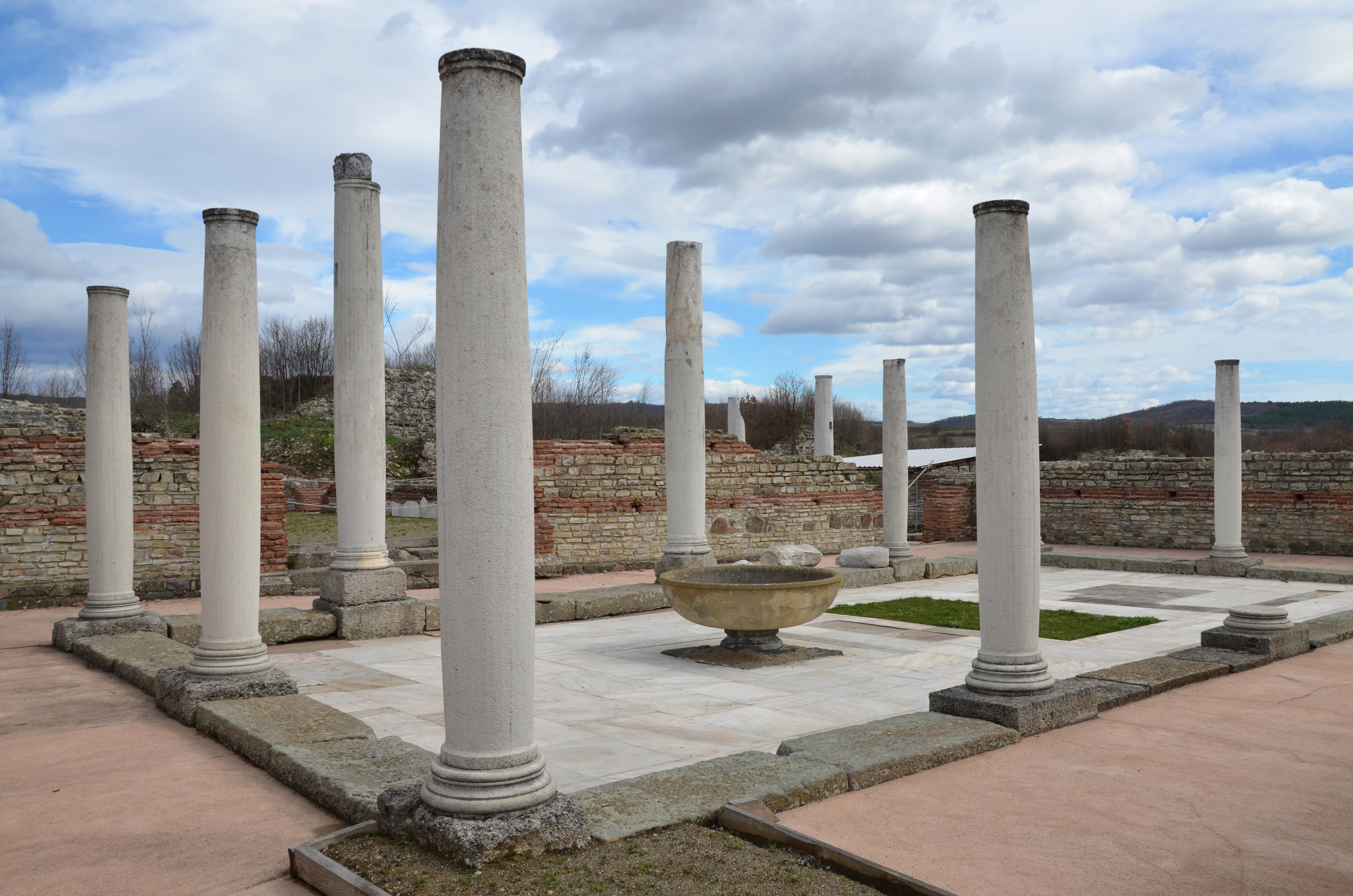
Excavated ruins at Felix Romuliana (after anastylosis)

== History ==
It is unclear whether Aurelian or the Emperor Diocletian replaced Dacia Aureliana with two provinces, but by 285, there were two – Dacia Mediterranea with its capital at Serdica and Dacia Ripensis, with its capital at Ratiaria. Later, these two "Dacias" along with Dardania, Lower Moesia, and Prevalitana constituted the Diocese of Dacia.

Ratiaria was established as the capital of Dacia Ripensis (it was previously a colony founded by Trajan located within Moesia Superior) and served both as the seat of the military governor (or dux) and as the military base for the Roman legion XIII Gemina.

According to Priscus, Dacia Ripensis was a flourishing province during the 4th and 5th centuries AD. During the early 440s, however, the Huns captured the province (prior to this, there were conflicts between the Romans and the Huns whereby the latter group captured Castra Martis through treacherous means). Even though the province recovered briefly from Hunnic rule, it was eventually decimated by the Avars in 586. On a more specific note, Aurelian developed Dacia Ripensis on a stretch of the Danube specifically between Moesia Superior and Moesia Inferior.

== Famous individuals ==
- Aurelian, Roman emperor from 270 to 275, was probably born in Dacia Ripensis, at that time still named Moesia.
- Roman Emperor Galerius was born in Dacia Ripensis.
- Palladius of Ratiaria, late 4th century Arian Christian theologian.
- Constantius Chlorus, Roman emperor from 293 to 306, born in Dacia Ripensis, c. 250.

== See also ==
- Dacia
- Roman Dacia
- List of ancient cities in Thrace and Dacia

== Sources ==
- Bury, J. B. (1923). "The Provincial List of Verona". The Journal of Roman Studies. 13 (1–2): 127–51. doi:10.2307/295748. JSTOR 295748.
- Cvjetićanin, Tatjana (2006). Late Roman Glazed Pottery: Glazed Pottery from Moesia Prima, Dacia Ripensis, Dacia Mediterranea and Dardania. Belgrade: National Museum. ISBN 978-86-7269-088-0.
- Hind, J. G. F. (1984). "Whatever Happened to the 'Agri Decumates'?". Britannia. 15: 187–92. doi:10.2307/526591. JSTOR 526591.
- Jones, C. P. (1988). "An Epigram from Ratiaria". The American Journal of Philology. 109 (2). The Johns Hopkins University Press: 231–38. doi:10.2307/294583. JSTOR 294583.
- Loring, William (1890). "A New Portion of the Edict of Diocletian from Megalopolis". The Journal of Hellenic Studies. 11: 299–342. doi:10.2307/623437. JSTOR 623437.
- Mackay, Christopher S. (1999). "Lactantius and the Succession to Diocletian". Classical Philology. 94 (2): 198–209. doi:10.1086/449431.
- Maenchen-Helfen, Otto J. (1955). "The Date of Ammianus Marcellinus' Last Books". The American Journal of Philology. 76 (4): 384–99. doi:10.2307/292272. JSTOR 292272.
- Turlej, Stanisław (2016). Justiniana Prima: An Underestimated Aspect of Justinian's Church Policy. Krakow: Jagiellonian University Press. ISBN 978-83-233-9556-0.
