= Moesia Prima =

Roman and Byzantine province in the Balkans

Provincia Moesia Prima Moesia Prima
- Province of the Roman Empire
- ca. 293 – ca. 602
- Roman Empire
- Capital: Viminacium
- Historical era: Late Antiquity
  - Administrative reform: ca. 293
  - Conquered by the Slavs: ca. 602

Moesia Prima (/ˈmiːʃə, -siə, -ʒə/; Latin: Moesia; Greek: Μοισία) was a frontier province of the Late Roman Empire, situated in the central parts of present-day Serbia, along the south bank of the Danube River. Its provincial capital was Viminacium, near modern Kostolac in Serbia).

== History ==
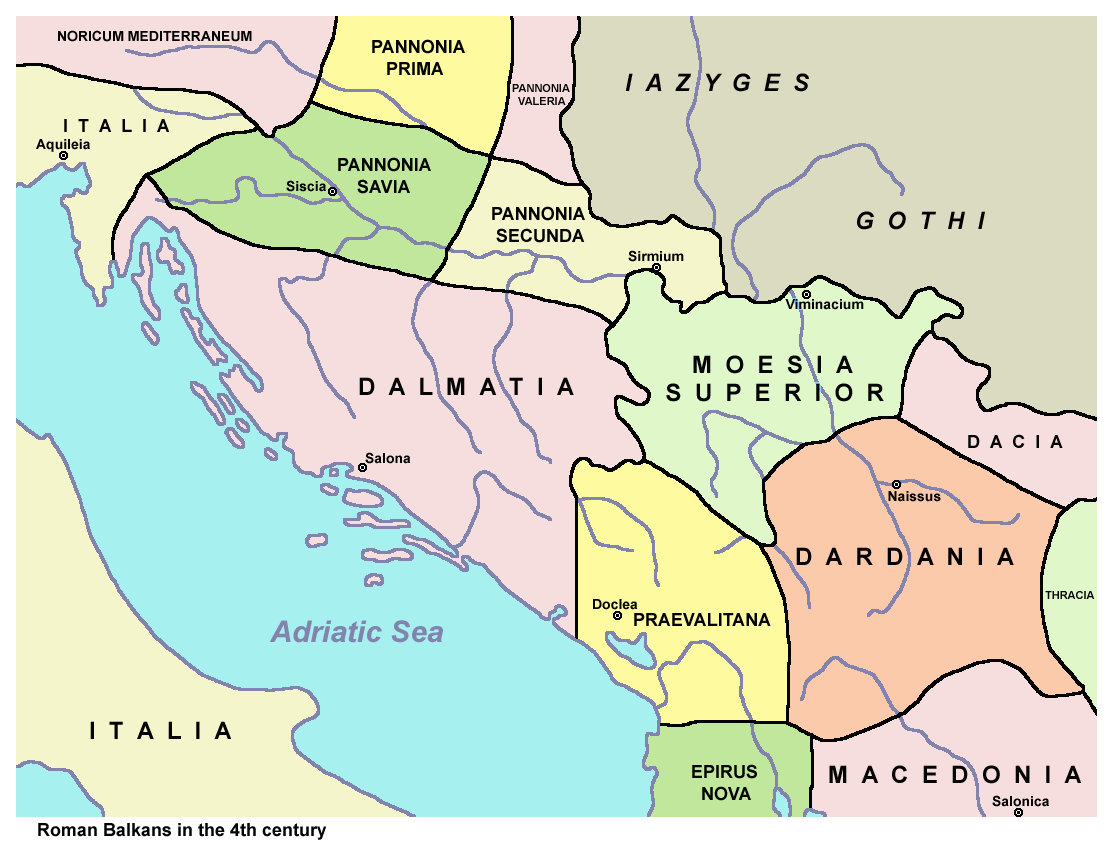
Roman provinces in Illyricum after administrative reforms of Diocletian

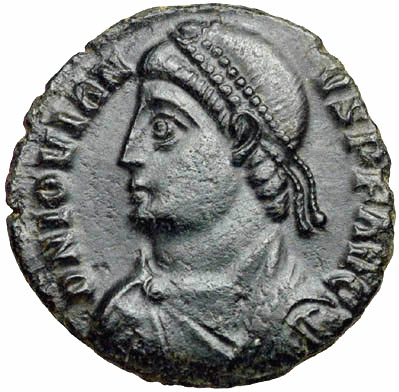
Coin of Roman emperor Jovian, who was born in Singidunum (Moesia Prima)

The province of Moesia Prima was created at the end of the 3rd century during administrative reforms of Roman emperor Diocletian (284–305) who divided the province of Moesia Superior in two separate provinces: Moesia Prima to the north and Dardania to the south.

Sometime in 293–294, emperor Diocletian traveled through Moesia Superior and came to its capital Viminacium. During that visit he created a new province under the name Moesia Superior Margensis or Moesia Prima. The term Margensis was used in reference to the name of Margus River that runs through the province. Diocletian also registered that the inhabitants of province wrote in Latin, as opposed to Greek in the southern regions.

At first, the province of Moesia Prima belonged to the Diocese of Moesia. Probably under the emperor Constantine I (306–337), the Diocese of Moesia was split in two, forming the Diocese of Dacia in the north and Diocese of Macedonia in the south. The province of Moesia Prima became part of Diocese of Dacia, that belonged to the Praetorian prefecture of Illyricum.

The emperor Jovian (363-364) who reestablished Christianity as the official religion of the Roman Empire was born in Moesia Prima, in Singidunum. In his early career, later to become Roman emperor, Theodosius I served as military commander of Moesia Prima in 373. In 382 the Roman emperors Theodosius I and Gratian met in Viminacium, the capital of Moesia Prima, during the Gothic Wars.

The Danubian border of Moesia Prima was protected by the fortifications of the limes. Two Roman legions were stationed in the province: Legio IV Flavia Felix in Singidunum and Legio VII Claudia in Viminacium. The seat of Praefectus legionis septimae Claudiae was in the frontier fortress of Cuppae (Golubac, Serbia).

As a frontier province, Moesia Prima was under constant threat of barbaric invasions. In the middle of the 5th century the province was devastated by the Huns of Attila who took Singidunum and Viminacium in 441. The province was later invaded by various Germanic tribes like Ostrogoths, Gepids, Heruli and others.

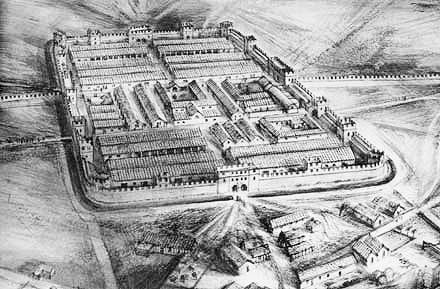
Archeological reconstruction of Viminacium

Major efforts to secure the province were undertaken in the time of Justinian I (527–565) who rebuilt Viminacium and Singidunum around 535, restoring the frontier fortresses to their former military importance.

In 535, emperor Justinian I (527-565) created the Archbishopric of Justiniana Prima as a regional primacy with ecclesiastical jurisdiction over all provinces of the Diocese of Dacia, including the province of Moesia Prima.

Throughout the 6th century, Moesia Prima was often invaded by Slavs. The province was also invaded but the Avars who took Singidunum and Viminacium during the war of 582-584. During emperor Maurice's military campaigns against Avars and Slavs, Moesia Prima served as a base of military operations.

After the fall of emperor Maurice in 602, Byzantine defenses in Moesia Prima finally collapsed. At the very beginning of the 7th century, Avars and Slavs sacked and burned Singidunum and Viminacium to the ground and the interior of the fallen province Moesia Prima was finally settled by the Slavic Serbs.

== Cities and towns ==
The chief towns of Moesia Prima were: Viminacium (sometimes called municipium Aelium; modern Kostolac), Singidunum (Belgrade) and Margum (archeological site Orašje, near Dubravica).

== See also ==
- Province of Moesia
- Province of Moesia Superior
- Inscriptions of Upper Moesia
- Battles of Viminacium
- Diocese of Moesia
- Diocese of Dacia
- Battle of Horreum Margi

== Sources ==
- Procopius. Edited by H. B. Dewing. 7 vols. Loeb Classical Library. Cambridge, Mass.: Harvard University Press and London, Hutchinson, 1914–40. Greek text and English translation.
- Maurice's Strategikon: Handbook of Byzantine Military Strategy. translated by George T. Dennis. Philadelphia 1984, Reprint 2001.
- Fischer Weltgeschichte, Band 13, "Byzanz" (pp. 139ff.). Franz Georg Maier, Frankfurt a. M. (1973) (in German)
- Bjelajac, Ljiljana (1995). "Late Roman Amphorae in the Danubian Region (Moesia Prima and Dacia Ripensis)". The Age of Tetrarchs. Belgrade: Serbian Academy of Sciences and Arts. pp. 13–20.
- Bulić, Dejan (2013). "The Fortifications of the Late Antiquity and the Early Byzantine Period on the Later Territory of the South-Slavic Principalities, and their re-occupation". The World of the Slavs: Studies of the East, West and South Slavs: Civitas, Oppidas, Villas and Archeological Evidence (7th to 11th Centuries AD). Belgrade: The Institute for History. pp. 137–234.
- Curta, Florin (2001). The Making of the Slavs: History and Archaeology of the Lower Danube Region, c. 500–700. Cambridge: Cambridge University Press. ISBN 9781139428880.
- Curta, Florin (2006). Southeastern Europe in the Middle Ages, 500–1250. Cambridge: Cambridge University Press. ISBN 9780521815390.
- Cvjetićanin, Tatjana (2006). Late Roman Glazed Pottery: Glazed Pottery from Moesia Prima, Dacia Ripensis, Dacia Mediterranea and Dardania. Belgrade: National Museum. ISBN 9788672690880.
- Given, John (2014). The Fragmentary History of Priscus. Merchantville, New Jersey: Evolution Publishing. ISBN 9781935228141.
- Gudea, Nicolae; Zahariade, Mihail (2017). Moesia Prima: Festungen an der Nordgrenze der Provinz und ihre Truppenkörper. Amsterdam: Hakkert.
- Janković, Đorđe (2004). "The Slavs in the 6th Century North Illyricum". Гласник Српског археолошког друштва. 20: 39–61.
- Kazhdan, Alexander (1991). "Singidunum". The Oxford Dictionary of Byzantium. Vol. 3. New York: Oxford University Press. p. 1904. ISBN 978-0-19-504652-6.
- Mirković, Miroslava B. (2017). Sirmium: Its History from the First Century AD to 582 AD. Novi Sad: Center for Historical Research.
- Mócsy, András (2014) [1974]. Pannonia and Upper Moesia: A History of the Middle Danube Provinces of the Roman Empire. New York: Routledge. ISBN 9781317754251.
- Popović, Radomir V. (1996). Le Christianisme sur le sol de l'Illyricum oriental jusqu'à l'arrivée des Slaves. Thessaloniki: Institute for Balkan Studies. ISBN 9789607387103.
- Turlej, Stanisław (2016). Justiniana Prima: An Underestimated Aspect of Justinian's Church Policy. Krakow: Jagiellonian University Press. ISBN 9788323395560.
- Vasić, Miloje R. (1988). "The Circulation of Bronze Coinage at the End of the 4th and Beginning of the 5th Centuries in Moesia Prima and Pannonia Secunda". Studia numismatica Labacensia: Alexandro Jeločnik oblata. Ljubljana: Narodni muzej. pp. 165–184.
- Vasić, Miloje R. (1995). "Moesia Prima and Dacia Ripensis in the Time of Valentinian I and Valens (364-378 A.D)". The Age of Tetrarchs. Belgrade: Serbian Academy of Sciences and Arts. pp. 327–335.
- Whitby, Michael (1988). The Emperor Maurice and his Historian: Theophylact Simocatta on Persian and Balkan warfare. Oxford: Clarendon Press. ISBN 978-0-19-822945-2.
- Zeiller, Jacques (1918). Les origines chrétiennes dans les provinces danubiennes de l'Empire romain. Paris: E. De Boccard.
