= Praevalitana =

Ancient Roman province

Praevalitana Praevalitana
- Part of Diocese of Moesia (284-357) Diocese of Macedonia (357-386) Diocese of Dacia (395) Administrative Unit of the Roman Empire
- c. 284–c. 600
- Praevalitana in the 6th century
- Capital: Doclea, later Scodra
- History
  - Administrative reform: c. 284
  - Slavic migration to the Southeast Europe: c. 600
Preceded by	Succeeded by
Dalmatia (Roman province)	Sclavinia

Praevalitana (also Prevalitana, Prevaliana, Praevaliana or Prevalis) was a Late Roman province that existed between c. 284 and c. 600. It included parts of present-day Montenegro, Albania, and part of present-day Kosovo. Its capital city was Doclea, later Scodra.

== Background ==
The Roman Empire conquered the Adriatic-Balkanic region after the Third Illyrian War, in which the Romans defeated Gentius, the last king of Illyria, at Scodra in 168 BC and captured him, bringing him to Rome in 165 BC. Four client-republics were set up, which were in fact governed by Roman administrators.

In 27 BC, the region was organized as a Roman province called Illyricum, directly governed by Rome and with Scodra as its capital. Illyricum was split into two in AD 10, as the provinces of Pannonia and Dalmatia. The province of Dalmatia spread inland to cover all of the Dinaric Alps and most of the eastern Adriatic coast, including all of Montenegro.

== Province ==
The province of Praevalitana was established during the reign of Emperor Diocletian (r. 284–305) from the southeastern corner of the former province of Dalmatia and became part of the Diocese of Moesia (290–357), one of 12 dioceses created by Diocletian within his tetrarchy. It was perhaps named Praevalitana (meaning "the region before the valley") because it stood directly to the west of Kosovo field.

The Diocese of Moesia was later divided in two and reorganized as the Diocese of Dacia in the north and the Diocese of Macedonia in the south. Praevalitana initially was part of the Diocese of Macedonia but was later moved into the Diocese of Dacia (which comprised Dacia Mediterranea, Dacia Ripensis, Dardania and Moesia Prima), a subdivision of the Praetorian prefecture of Illyricum (395). A province of brief existence, Macedonia Salutaris, was divided between Praevalitana and Epirus Nova (412).

After the Western Roman Empire collapsed in 476, the region remained under the rule of the Eastern Roman Empire. In the 530s, Byzantine generals of Emperor Justinian I (r. 527–565) used Praevalitana as a base for military campaigns against the Ostrogoths in Dalmatia during the Gothic War.

During the Migration Period, Praevalitana was overrun by invasions of the Avars and Slavs. In the 6th and 7th centuries, they destroyed the province's main cities and overran much of the hinterland.

== Cities ==
The first written records of any kind of settlement in southern Dalmatia refer to the Roman province of Praevalitana and the Roman city of Birsiminium, which lived in the shadow of the Illyrian town of Doclea (Duklja), a large city by the standards of that time, boasting 8–10 thousand inhabitants and named after one of the two major Illyrian tribes inhabiting these parts, the "Docleatae". The Docleatae inhabited the fertile valley of the River Zeta, located along the vital link between the coastal and continental regions of Montenegro, which helped their swift economic rise.

The other tribe, the "Labeates", inhabited the entire area between Lake Skadar and modern Podgorica. They had their main fortification, called Metheon (known today as Medun), and well developed social and military systems in place.

From the 6th century, the settling of Slavic and Avaric tribes began in this area, always coupled with destructive raids on the native tribes and settlements. Doclea was not exempt from these violent raids, which would, eventually, along with natural disasters, lead to the complete obliteration of this once prosperous town. After the Slavic tribes settled in this area they established another settlement, which took over the role previously held by Doclea: it was named Ribnica (Podgorica). The native non-romanized population retreated into the Albanian highlands, while Acruvium (present-day Kotor) on the coast survived the Slav attacks and prospered as a merchant city-state of the original romanized Illyrians until the 10th century. Other cities in the province included Anderva (Nikšić) and Risinium (Risan). As well as Siparantum (Peja), from the 5th to 9th century also known as Pescium/Episkion (Episcopal City).

== Ecclesiastical order ==
During the existence of the province, its capital city of Scodra was also the main ecclesiastical center in the region. Bishop of Scodra held metropolitan jurisdiction over all other bishops within the province, including those of Dioclea and Lissus. In 431, metropolitan Senecio of Scodra participated at the Third Ecumenical Council, in Ephesus. In 535, the Metropolis of Scodra and its suffragan bishops came under jurisdiction of the newly created Archbishopric of Justiniana Prima. Siparantum, modern-day Peja, used to be the center of an Episcopal See, indicated by its name Pescium/Episkion. At the beginning of the 7th century, ecclesiastical order collapsed with the fall of the province.

== Sources ==
- Fine, John Van Antwerp Jr. (1991) [1983]. The Early Medieval Balkans: A Critical Survey from the Sixth to the Late Twelfth Century. Ann Arbor, Michigan: University of Michigan Press.
- Moravcsik, Gyula, ed. (1967) [1949]. Constantine Porphyrogenitus: De Administrando Imperio (2nd revised ed.). Washington D.C.: Dumbarton Oaks Center for Byzantine Studies.
- Ostrogorsky, George (1956). History of the Byzantine State. Oxford: Basil Blackwell.
- Popović, Radomir V. (1996). Le Christianisme sur le sol de l'Illyricum oriental jusqu'à l'arrivée des Slaves. Thessaloniki: Institute for Balkan Studies.
- Popović, Vladislav (1984). "Byzantins, Slaves et autochtones dans les provinces de Prévalitane et Nouvelle Épire". Villes et peuplement dans l'Illyricum protobyzantin. Roma: École française. pp. 181–243.
- Stevović, Ivan (2016). "Early Byzantine Doclea and its citizens: Longe ab patriam" (PDF). Niš and Byzantium. 14: 121–136.
- Turlej, Stanisław (2016). Justiniana Prima: An Underestimated Aspect of Justinian’s Church Policy. Krakow: Jagiellonian University Press.
