= Diocese of Moesiae =

Roman diocese

Diocese of Moesia Dioecesis Moesiarum Διοίκησις Μοισίας
- Diocese of the Roman Empire
- c. 293 AD – before 337 AD
- Diocese of Moesia, c. 400 AD
- Demonym: Moesian
- Historical era: Late Antiquity
  - Administrative reform: c. AD 293
  - Division in two dioceses: c. before AD 337
Preceded by	Succeeded by
Moesia	Diocese of Dacia; Diocese of Macedonia
- Today part of: Albania, Bulgaria, Greece, Montenegro, North Macedonia, Serbia

The Diocese of Moesia (Latin: Dioecesis Moesiarum, Greek: Διοίκησις Μοισίας) was a diocese of the later Roman Empire, in the area of modern western Bulgaria, central Serbia, Montenegro, Albania, North Macedonia, and Greece.

== History ==
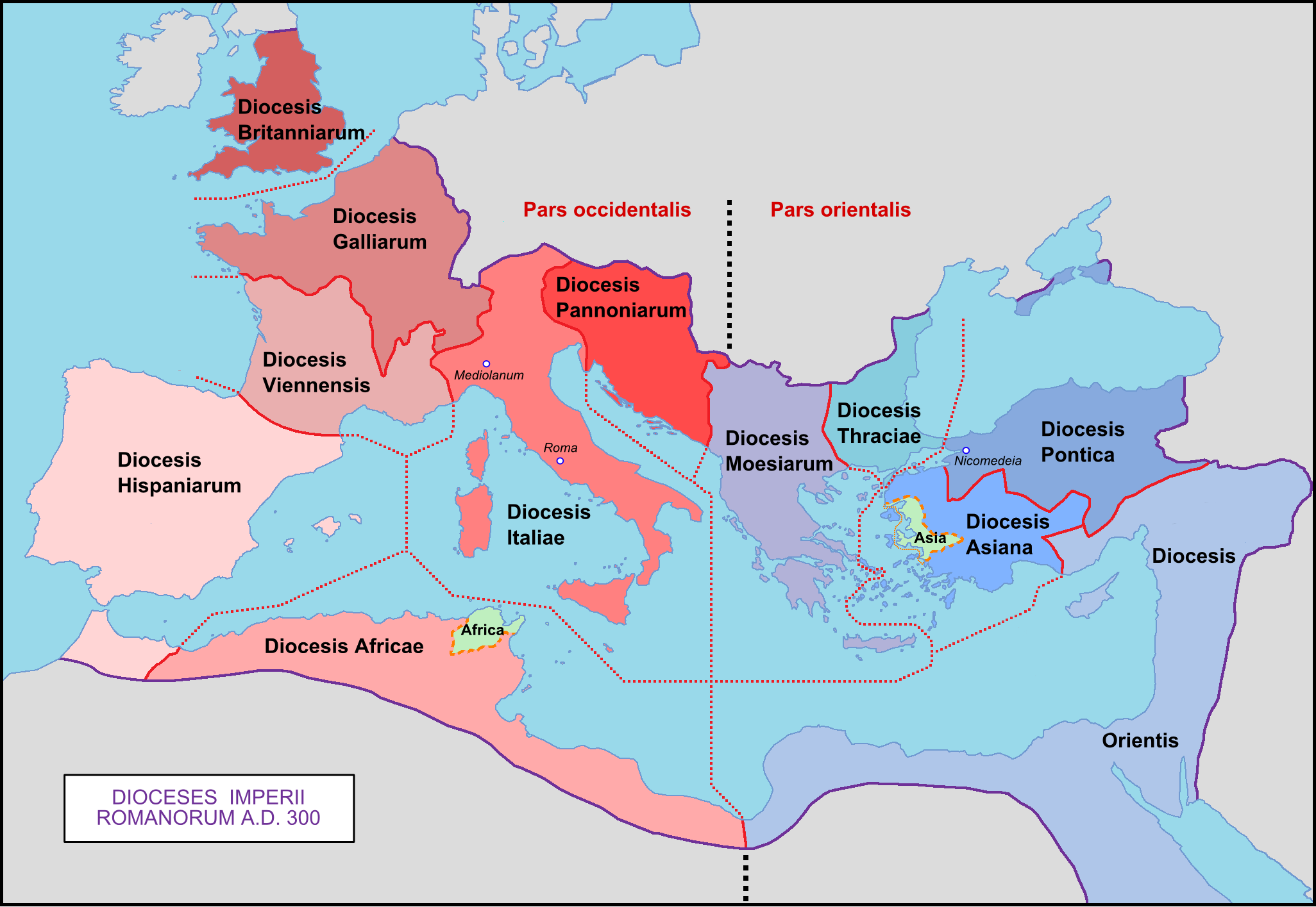
Roman Empire with dioceses in 300 AD

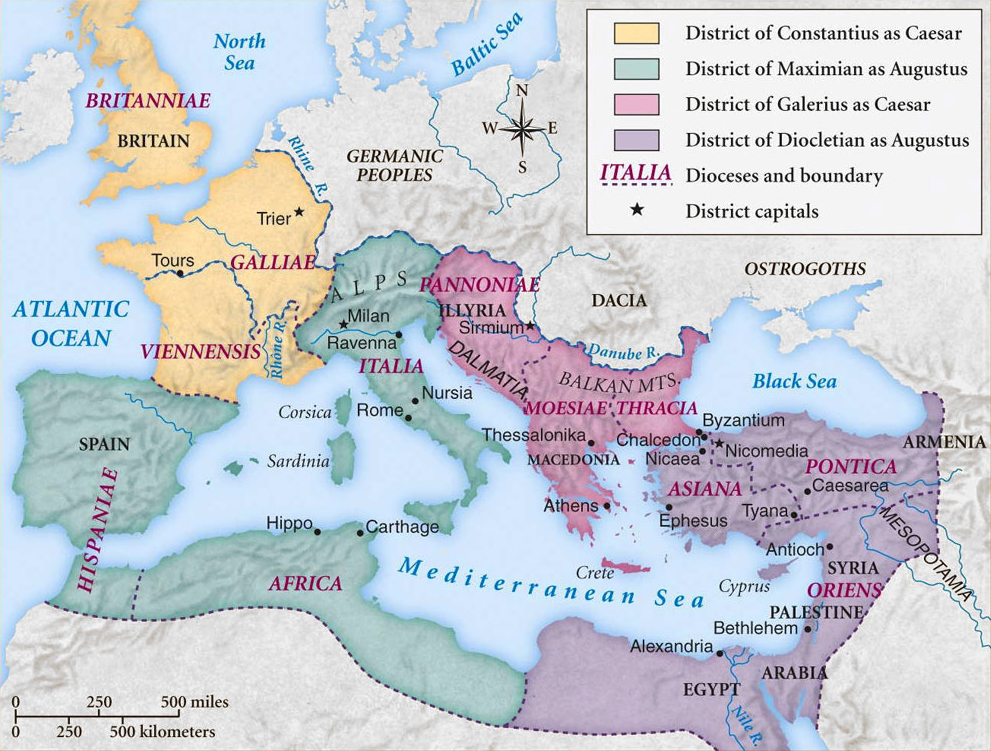
Roman Empire during Tetrarchy

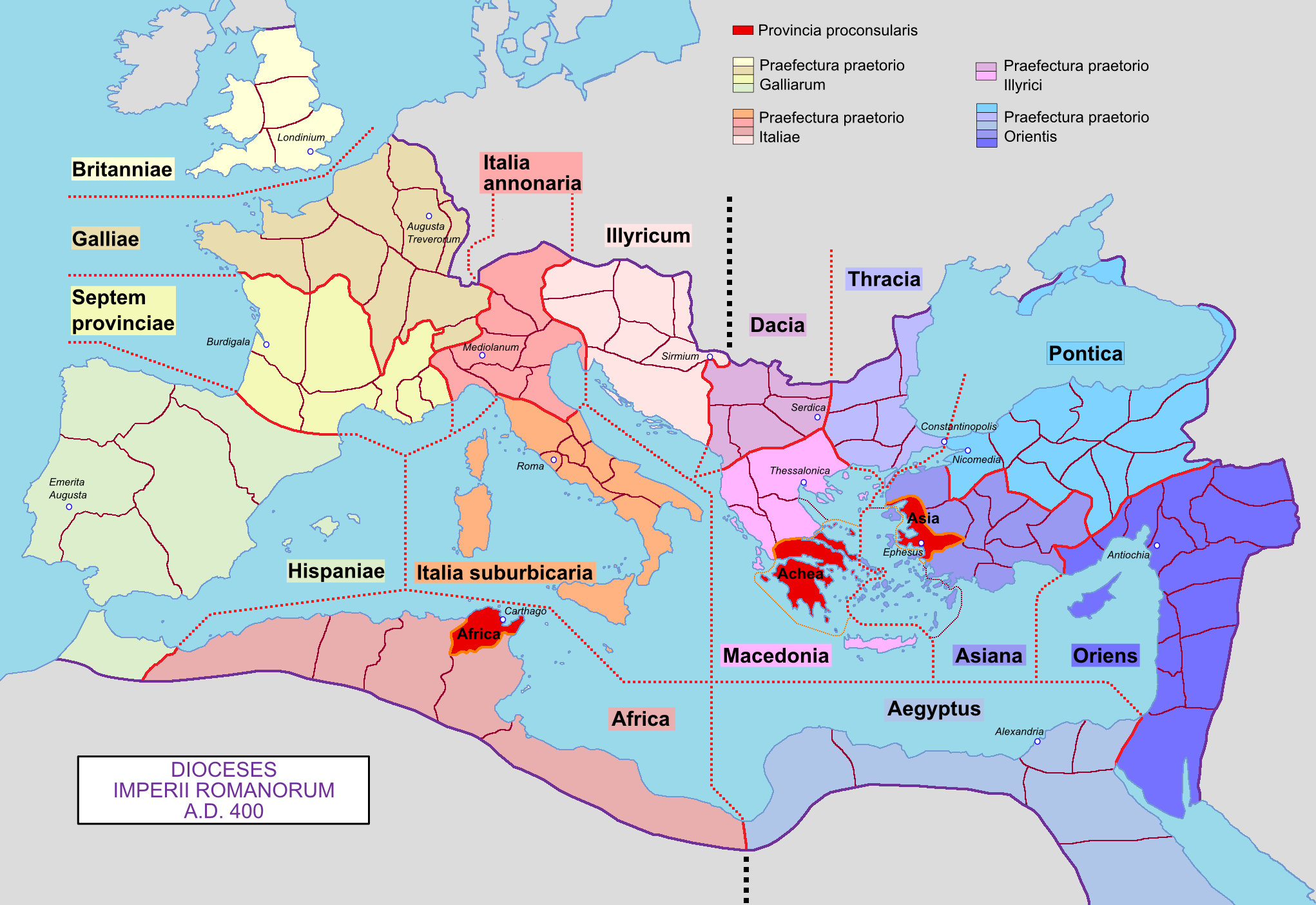
Roman Empire with dioceses in 400 AD

The Diocese of Moesia was one of the twelve dioceses in which Diocletian (284–305) divided the Roman Empire during his administrative reforms. It encompassed most of the ancient Greek and Illyrian lands, stretching from the Crete to Danube. During the time of Tetrarchy, the diocese was under the jurisdiction of Caesar Galerius who kept it under his own control during much of his reign as Augustus (305-311). He died and was buried in the city of Felix Romuliana, on the territory of the Diocese of Moesia.

The diocese was later split in two, forming the Diocese of Macedonia in the south and the Diocese of Dacia in the north, probably under Constantine I (r. 306–337), although the division is not attested until ca. 370. The two new dioceses were grouped into the new praetorian prefecture of Illyricum in the second half of the 4th century, which essentially covered the same area as the Diocese of Moesia.

== Administration ==
After the administrative reforms of emperor Diocletian, the Diocese of Moesia was composed of provinces:

- Achaea
- Crete
- Dacia Mediterranea
- Dacia Ripensis
- Dardania
- Epirus Nova
- Epirus Vetus
- Insulae
- Macedonia Prima
- Macedonia Secunda
- Moesia Prima
- Praevalitana
- Thessalia Prima
- Thessalia Secunda
