= Diocese of Dacia =

Diocese of the Roman Empire

Diocese of Dacia Dioecesis Daciarum Διοίκησις Δακίας
- Diocese of the Roman Empire
- ca. 337 – ca. 602
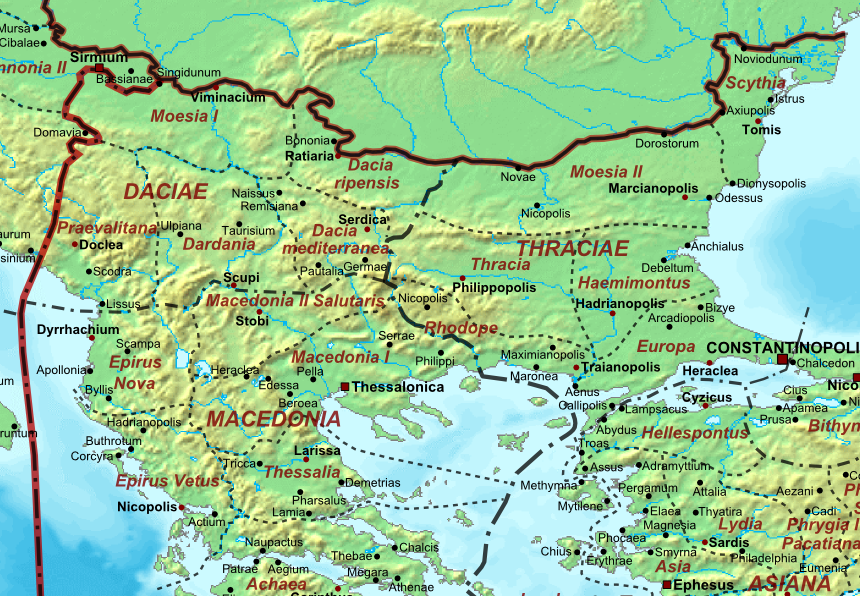
- Dioceses of Dacia and Thrace in 400 AD
- Capital: Serdica (modern Sofia)
- Historical era: Late Antiquity
  - Split from Diocese of Moesia: ca. 337
  - Merged into the newly formed Praetorian prefecture of Illyricum: 357
  - Merged into the Praetorian prefecture of Italy: 384
  - Merged back into Illyricum after Theodosius' death: 395
  - Devastated by the Avars and the Slavs: ca. 602

The Diocese of Dacia (Latin: Dioecesis Daciae) was a diocese of the later Roman Empire, in the area of modern western Bulgaria, central Serbia, Montenegro, Kosovo, northern Albania and northern North Macedonia. It was subordinate to the Praetorian prefecture of Illyricum. Its capital was at Serdica (modern Sofia).

== History ==
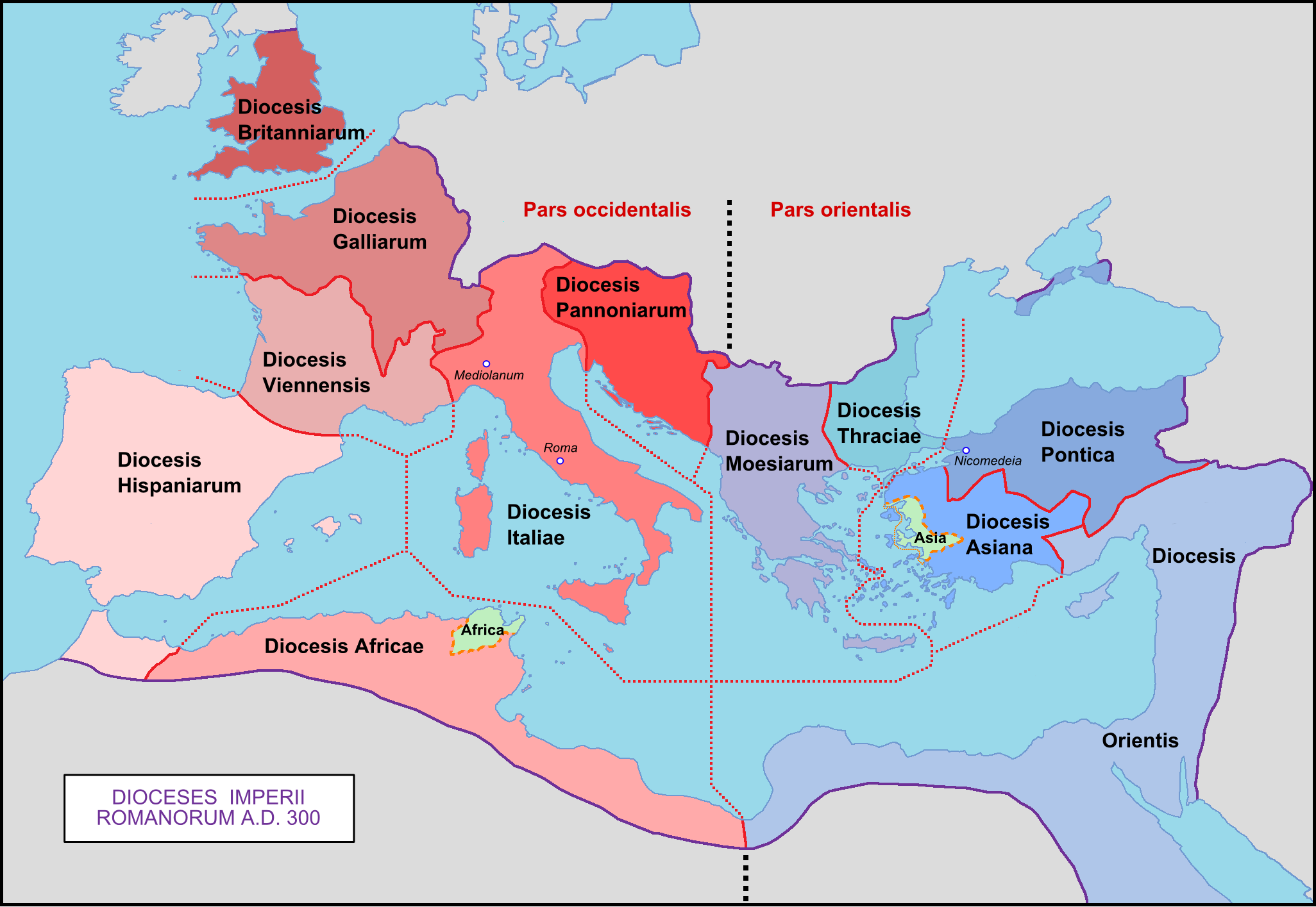
Roman Empire with dioceses in 300 AD

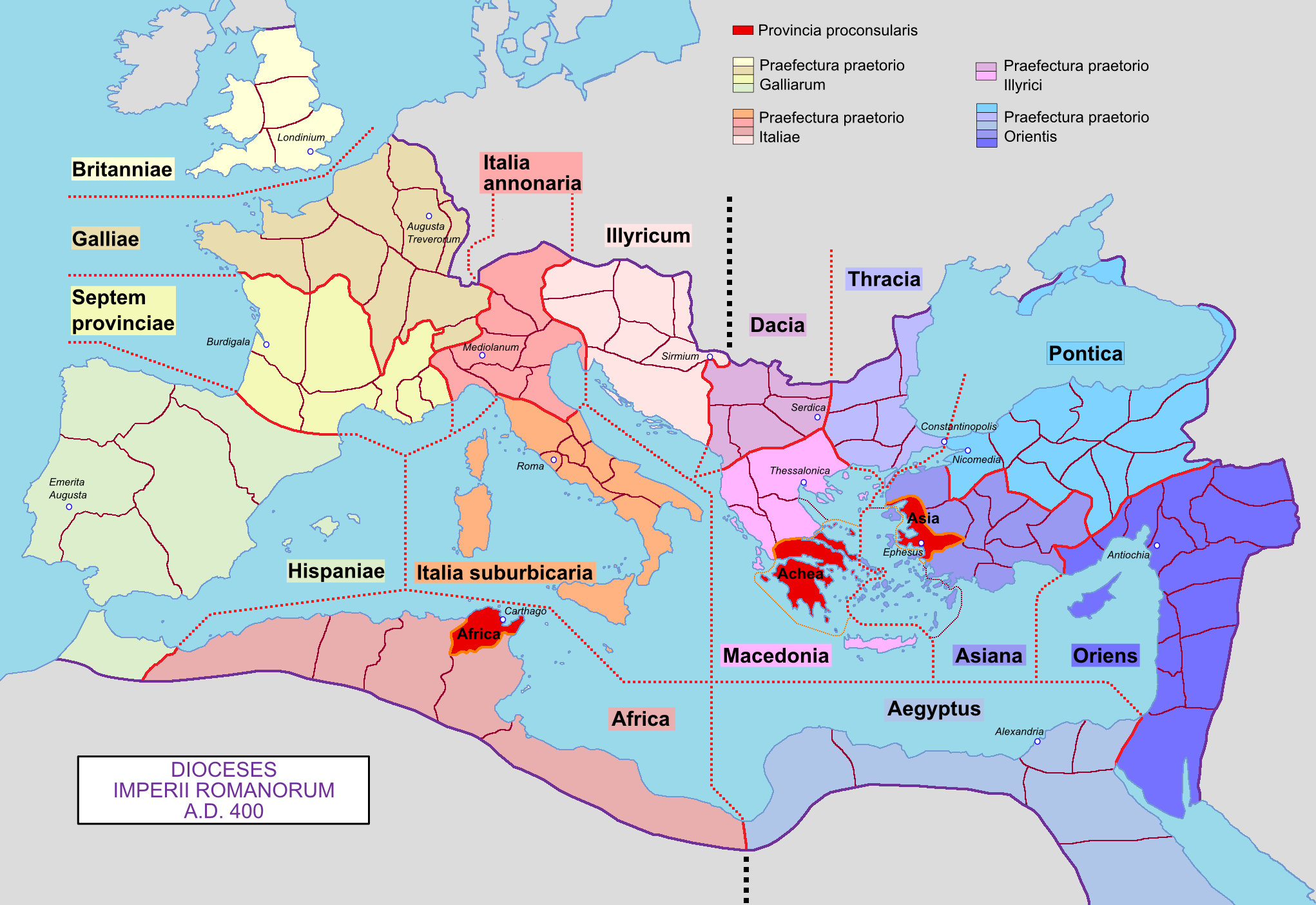
Roman Empire with dioceses in 400 AD

=== Origin of the name ===
Emperor Aurelian (270–275), confronted with the secession of Gallia and Hispania from the empire since 260, with the advance of the Sassanids in Asia, and the devastations that the Carpians and the Goths had created in Moesia and Illyria, abandoned the province of Dacia created by Trajan and withdrew his troops altogether, fixing the Roman frontier at the Danube. A new Dacia Aureliana was organised south of the Danube out of central Moesia, with its capital at Serdica.

The abandonment of Dacia Traiana by the Romans is mentioned by Eutropius in his Breviarium historiae Romanae, book IX :

The province of Dacia, which Trajan had formed beyond the Danube, he gave up, despairing, after all Illyricum and Moesia had been depopulated, of being able to retain it. The Roman citizens, removed from the town and lands of Dacia, he settled in the interior of Moesia, calling that Dacia which now divides the two Moesiae, and which is on the right hand of the Danube as it runs to the sea, whereas Dacia was previously on the left.

=== Creation ===
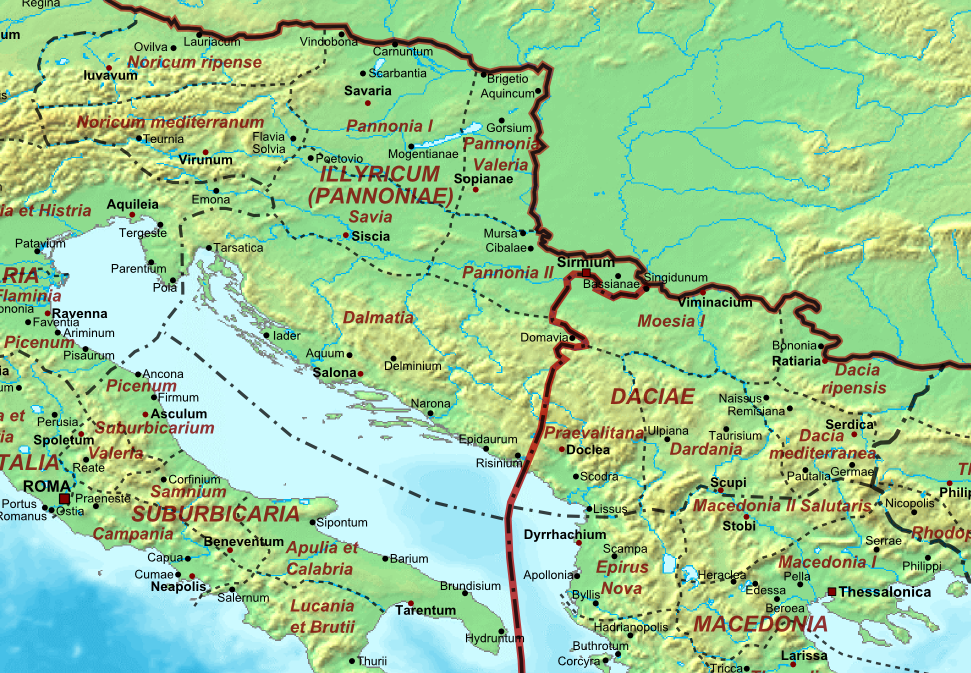
Dioceses of Dacia and Pannonia in 400 AD

Map of the northern Balkans in the 6th century, including the Diocese of Dacia and its provinces.

During the administrative reforms of Diocletian (284–305), the Diocese of Moesia was created, encompassing most of the central Balkans and the Greek peninsula. Later, however, probably in the time of Constantine the Great (306–337) the diocese was split in two, forming the Diocese of Macedonia in the south and the Diocese of Dacia, in the north.

The Diocese of Dacia was composed of five provinces: Dacia Mediterranea (the southern, interior portion of Dacia Aureliana), Dacia Ripensis (the northern, Danubian portion of Dacia Aureliana), Moesia Prima (the northern portion of Moesia Superior), Dardania (the southern portion of Moesia Superior) and Praevalitana (the eastern portion of Dalmatia).

The dioceses capital was at Serdica (modern Sofia). Administration of diocese was headed by a vicarius. According to the Notitia dignitatum (an early 5th century imperial chancery document), the vicarius had the rank of vir spectabilis.

The diocese was transferred to the Western Empire in 384 by Theodosius I, probably in partial compensation to the empress Justina for his recognition of the usurpation of Magnus Maximus in the Gallic Empire. However, upon his death in 395, it reverted to the Eastern Empire, forming, together with the Diocese of Macedonia to the south, the Praetorian prefecture of Illyricum.

In 535, under emperor Justinian I (527–565), ecclesiastical order on the territory of the diocese was reshaped, and new Archbishopric of Justiniana Prima was created, centered in emperor's birth city of Justiniana Prima. Newly appointed archbishop was given metropolitan jurisdiction over all provinces of the Diocese of Dacia.

=== Destruction ===
The territory of diocese was devastated by the Huns in the middle of 5th century and finally overrun by the Avars and Slavs in late 6th and early 7th century.

== See also ==
- Diocese of Moesia
- Province of Moesia
- Province of Moesia Superior
- Inscriptions of Upper Moesia
- Battles of Viminacium

== Sources ==
- Procopius. Edited by H. B. Dewing. 7 vols. Loeb Classical Library. Cambridge, Massachusetts: Harvard University Press and London, Hutchinson, 1914–40. Greek text and English translation.
- Maurice's Strategikon: Handbook of Byzantine Military Strategy. translated by George T. Dennis. Philadelphia 1984, Reprint 2001.
- Curta, Florin (2001). "Limes and Cross: the Religious Dimension of the Sixth-century Danube Frontier of the Early Byzantine Empire". Старинар. 51: 45–70.
- Curta, Florin (2001). The Making of the Slavs: History and Archaeology of the Lower Danube Region, c. 500–700. Cambridge: Cambridge University Press.
- Curta, Florin (2006). Southeastern Europe in the Middle Ages, 500–1250. Cambridge: Cambridge University Press.
- Given, John (2014). The Fragmentary History of Priscus. Merchantville, New Jersey: Evolution Publishing.
- Ivanišević, Vujadin (2015). "The Danubian Limes of the Diocese of Dacia in the 5th Century". The Frontier World: Romans, Barbarians and Military Culture. Budapest: Institute for Archaeological Sciences. pp. 653–665.
- Janković, Đorđe (2004). "The Slavs in the 6th Century North Illyricum". Гласник Српског археолошког друштва. 20: 39–61.
- Kazhdan, Alexander (1991). "Singidunum". The Oxford Dictionary of Byzantium. Vol. 3. New York: Oxford University Press. p. 1904.
- Mirković, Miroslava B. (2017). Sirmium: Its History from the First Century AD to 582 AD. Novi Sad: Center for Historical Research.
- Mócsy, András (2014) [1974]. Pannonia and Upper Moesia: A History of the Middle Danube Provinces of the Roman Empire. New York: Routledge.
- Petrović, Vladimir P. (2007). "Pre-Roman and Roman Dardania: Historical and Geographical Considerations" (PDF). Balcanica. 37. Balkanološki institut SANU: 7–23.
- Popović, Radomir V. (1996). Le Christianisme sur le sol de l'Illyricum oriental jusqu'à l'arrivée des Slaves. Thessaloniki: Institute for Balkan Studies.
- Turlej, Stanisław (2016). Justiniana Prima: An Underestimated Aspect of Justinian's Church Policy. Krakow: Jagiellonian University Press.
- Whitby, Michael (1988). The Emperor Maurice and his Historian: Theophylact Simocatta on Persian and Balkan warfare. Oxford: Clarendon Press.
- Zeiller, Jacques (1918). Les origines chrétiennes dans les provinces danubiennes de l'Empire romain. Paris: E. De Boccard.
