= Centre for Ancient Epigraphy and Numismatics, University of Belgrade =

The Centre for Ancient Epigraphy and Numismatics (French: Centre d’Études Épigraphiques et Numismatiques "Fanula Papazoglou") is a research centre of the University of Belgrade for the study epigraphy, inscriptions and numismatics of the ancient Balkans.

The centre was founded in 1970 under the Department of History by Fanula Papazoglu (1917–2001) a noted Greek-Serbian classical scholar and epigrapher.

The centre's main activities include research in the field of ancient history and epigraphy, focusing on epigraphic material from Serbian territory, i.e. the former Roman provinces Moesia Superior, Pannonia Inferior and Dalmatia. As well as the photo documentation of the Centre.

== Publications ==
The Centre continues the publication of epigraphic material and historical monographs under the series IMS Inscriptions of Upper Moesia (French Inscriptions de la Mésie supérieure). Individual publications include:

- Fanoula Papazoglou, Laoi et Paroikoi. Recherches sur la structure de la société hellénistique
- Mélanges d'histoire et d'épigraphie offerts à Fanoula Papazoglou, Belgrade 1997.
