= Diocese of Macedonia =

Diocese of the Roman Empire

Diocese of Macedonia Dioecesis Macedoniae Διοίκησις Μακεδονίας
- Diocese of Roman Empire then Eastern Roman Empire
- 306 AD–7th century
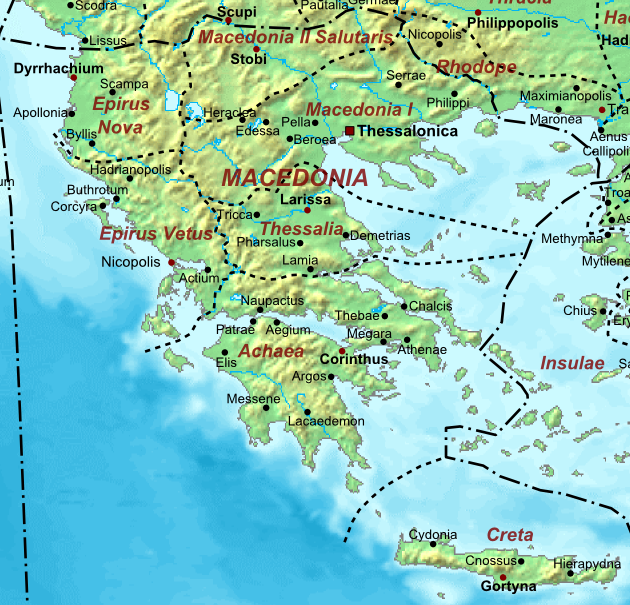
- Capital: Thessalonica
- Historical era: Late Antiquity
  - Reforms of Diocletian: 306 AD
  - Thessalonica became the Prefecture's new capital city: 379
  - Slavic invasion of the Balkans: 7th century
  - Division into the Theme of Thessalonica, Strymon, Dyrrhachium and Hellas: 7th century
- Today part of: Greece; North Macedonia; Albania; Bulgaria

The Diocese of Macedonia (Latin: Dioecesis Macedoniae; Greek: Διοίκησις Μακεδονίας) was a diocese of the later Roman and then early Byzantine Empire, forming part of the praetorian prefecture of Illyricum. Its administrative centre was Thessalonica.

== History ==
The diocese was formed, probably under Constantine I (r. 306–337), from the division of the Diocletianic Diocese of Moesia. It included the provinces of Macedonia Prima, Macedonia Salutaris, Thessalia, Epirus vetus, Epirus nova, Achaea, and Crete. Alongside Dacia and, until 379, Pannonia, it made up the Prefecture of Illyricum. In 379, Pannonia was detached and merged into the Praetorian prefecture of Italy and Thessaloniki became the Prefecture's new capital city instead of Sirmium.

== See also ==
- Macedonia (terminology)
- Macedonia (Roman province)
- Macedonia (theme)

== Sources ==
- Notitia dignitatum, Pars Orientalis, III
- Joseph Roisman, Ian Worthington, A Companion to Ancient Macedonia,
