= Dacia Mediterranea =

Balkan Province, Late Roman/Byzantine

Dacia Mediterranea Provincia Dacia Mediterranea Επαρχία Δακίας Μεσογείου (Greek)
- Province of Roman Empire
- 320s–c. 602
- The northern Balkans, including Dacia Mediterranea, in the 6th century
- Capital: Serdica (now Sofia, Bulgaria)
- History
  - Evacuation of Dacia Traiana, creation of Dacia Aureliana: 271
  - Dacia Ripensis partitioned: 320s
  - Devastated by Avar invasion: c. 602
Preceded by	Succeeded by
Dacia Aureliana	Pannonian Avars

Dacia Mediterranea (Mid-land Dacia; Greek: Δακία Μεσόγειος, romanized: Dakia Mesogeios) was a late antique Roman province, whose capital city was Serdica (or Sardica; later Sradetz or Sredets, now Sofia).

The date for the establishment of Dacia Mediterranea is uncertain. It was traditionally held to have been established at the same time as Dacia Ripensis, with both provinces being carved out of the former Dacia Aureliana as part of the Diocletianic restructuring of the Roman provinces during the 290s. However, as Dacia Mediterranea contained cities that were never part of Dacia Aureliana (such as Naissus), it is now believed that the province was established in the 320s, during the reign of Constantine I, and was formed with territory taken from the provinces of Dardania, Thracia and the partition of Dacia Ripensis (with Ripensis losing its capital, Serdica, in the process, a city that was previously also the capital of Dacia Aureliana).

Lying immediately south of Dacia Ripensis, the province was governed by a Consularis. In 535, the emperor Justinian I (527–565) created the Archbishopric of Justiniana Prima as a regional primacy with ecclesiastical jurisdiction over all provinces of the Diocese of Dacia, including the province of Dacia Mediterranea. During this time he also strengthened the fortifications of various cities in the province, including Serdica, Naissus, Germania and Pautalia. He also added forts to existing cities, such as Remesiana.

Dacia Mediterranea was caught up in the devastation of the Avar and Slav invasions of the late 6th and early 7th centuries, and was lost at the same time as the Diocese of Dacia, although pockets of the province continued to remain in Byzantine hands, such as Serdica and its immediate surrounds. These south-eastern remnants were eventually absorbed into the Theme of Thrace by the late 7th century.

== Sources ==
- Cvjetićanin, Tatjana (2006). Late Roman Glazed Pottery: Glazed Pottery from Moesia Prima, Dacia Ripensis, Dacia Mediterranea and Dardania. Belgrade: National Museum. ISBN 9788672690880.
- Grumeza, Ion (2009). Dacia: Land of Transylvania, Cornerstone of Ancient Eastern Europe. Lanham: Hamilton Books. ISBN 9780761844662.
- Mócsy, András (2014) [1974]. Pannonia and Upper Moesia: A History of the Middle Danube Provinces of the Roman Empire. New York: Routledge. ISBN 9781317754251.
- Nicholson, Oliver (2018). The Oxford Dictionary of Late Antiquity. Oxford: Oxford University Press. ISBN 978-0-19-256246-3.
- Snively, Carolyn S. (2005). "Dacia Mediterranea and Macedonia Secunda in the Sixth Century: A Question of Influence on Church Architecture" (PDF). Niš and Byzantium. 3: 213–224.
- Southern, Pat (2001). The Roman Empire from Severus to Constantine. London and New York: Routledge. ISBN 9781134553815.
- Turlej, Stanisław (2016). Justiniana Prima: An Underestimated Aspect of Justinian's Church Policy. Krakow: Jagiellonian University Press. ISBN 9788323395560.
- Zeiller, Jacques (1918). Les origines chrétiennes dans les provinces danubiennes de l'Empire romain. Paris: E. De Boccard.
