= Later Roman Empire =

284 to 641 in the history of the Roman Empire

In historiography, the late or later Roman Empire, traditionally covering the period from 284 CE to 641 CE, refers to the Roman Empire's history during the era of late antiquity. It was a time of significant transformation in Roman governance, society, and religion. Diocletian's reforms, including the establishment of the tetrarchy, aimed to address the vastness of the empire and internal instability. The rise of Christianity, legalized by Constantine the Great in 313 CE, profoundly changed the religious landscape, becoming a central force in Roman life. Simultaneously, barbarian invasions, particularly by the Goths and the Huns, weakened the Western Roman Empire, which collapsed in 476 CE. In contrast, the Eastern Roman Empire endured, evolving into the Byzantine Empire and laying the foundations for medieval Europe.

The era of the Later Roman Empire ended when Muslim armies conquered much of the Byzantine Empire's Near Eastern territories, which were incorporated into the newly emerged Rashidun Caliphate in the 640s and the 650s.

== Evidence ==
=== Histories ===
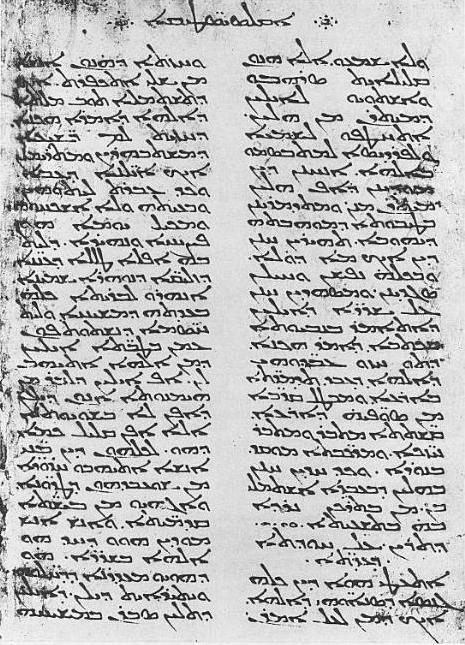
Syriac manuscript of Eusebius' Church History (National Library of Russia, Codex Syriac 1)

In comparison with previous periods, studies on later Roman history are based on diverse but mainly biased written sources. Completed around 314, Lactantius's work about the Diocletianic Persecution, titled On the Death of the Persecutors, is an early example of prejudiced narrative. Hagiographies—Christian martyrs' and ascetics' biographies—form the period's most distinctive literary genre. The Martyrs of Palestine by Eusebius, Bishop of Caesarea, introduced it in the early 4th century, but a later work, the Life of Anthony about the Egyptian hermit, Anthony the Great set a template for further works. Eusebius' Life of Constantine about the first Christian emperor is a useful collection of letters and official documents. In contrast with classical literature, Hagiographic works regularly presented women as leading characters. Examples include the Life of Macrina about a wealthy and pious aristocrat Macrina the Younger.

With his Church History, Eusebius originated another new literary genre with the focus on Christian missionaries, church leaders, martyrs and heretics. This first church history was revised and resumed by Rufinus in 402. Books written by Socrates of Constantinople, Sozomen and Theodoret are the principal sources of ecclesiastic life until the mid-5th century. Orosius was the first scholar to integrate elements of classical and church history in the 420s. With his History against the Pagans, he wanted to demonstrate that recent calamities cannot be regarded as a punishment for the suppression of traditional Roman religion. Only three church historians' works survived from the 6th century: Zacharias Rhetor, John of Ephesus and Evagrius Scholasticus focus on theological debates. Later church histories, primarily destined to demonstrate the effects of divine providence on human life, seldom provide sufficient information for a deeper analysis of secular history. The Chronicon Paschale is of the utmost importance for the study of the otherwise poorly documented early 7th century. A late source, Theophanes the Confessor's 9th-century Chronographia, is invaluable for the military history of the 620s.

Most information about military and political history has been preserved in secular historians' works. When writing of events familiar to them or their acquaintances, they are mostly reliable. Aurelius Victor and an unknown author completed short imperial biographies in the second half of the 4th century, allegedly using a common source. Around 370 two imperial secretaries, Eutropius and Festus, completed concise accounts of Roman history. Pagan Greek officer Ammianus Marcellinus "has a claim to be the finest Latin historian of any period", according to historian Stephen Mitchell, although only fragments of his Histories survived. Likewise only fragments are known from the works of Ammianus' continuator, Sulpicius Alexander. Scholars studying 5th-century Roman history can primarily rely on a 10th-century collection of fragments from earlier Greek authors' works. One of them, Priscus, wrote a detailed report of his visit at Attila the Hun's court in 449. The pagan Zosimus, the sole prominent later Roman historian whose full work survived, blames Christianity for the quick decline of the Roman Empire. The last outstanding Roman historian, Procopius completed detailed accounts of Emperor Justinian I's rule. His Wars covers military actions. His Buildings provides a list of the achievements of Justinian's building program, but archaeological evidence sometimes contradicts it. He summarizes his true views of Justinian and Justinian's inner circle in the Secret History, describing him as a wicked and unscrupulous figure surrounded by intrigues and scandals. The events of the second half of the 6th century are best known from the fragmentary works of Agathias and Menander the Guardsman. Agathias emphasizes the effect of unexpected events on history, Menander mainly cover diplomacy. The early-7th-century Theophylact Simocatta is the least reliable later Roman historian: both his chronology and topography are chaotic.

=== Legal texts and inscriptions ===
The systematic collection of legal texts commenced in the late Roman period. The Code of Theodosius contains about 2,500 entries and covers the period between 335 and 437. The Code of Justinian expands the Code of Theodosius with rulings issued by emperors between 437 and 529. Both legal compilations are important sources of state administration, although their actual application is unproven. The early 5th-century Notitia Dignitatum is a useful source of the empire's civil and military administration even if it likely contains exaggerated data: both military commanders and high-ranking civil servants tended to emphasize the importance of their office by giving overestimated numbers to official data collectors. In comparison with the classical age, late Roman inscriptions are available in lesser quantity. Although collective ovations for dignitaries were still regularly commemorated in public places, in this period they were made mainly in honor of imperial officials instead of local leaders as it had been common in the previous centuries.

=== Archaeology ===
Archaeological finds also abound, although "they remain understudied" (as Mitchell emphasizes it in 2015). The systematic study of archaeological evidence intensified after the dating system of late Roman pottery stabilized.

== Background ==
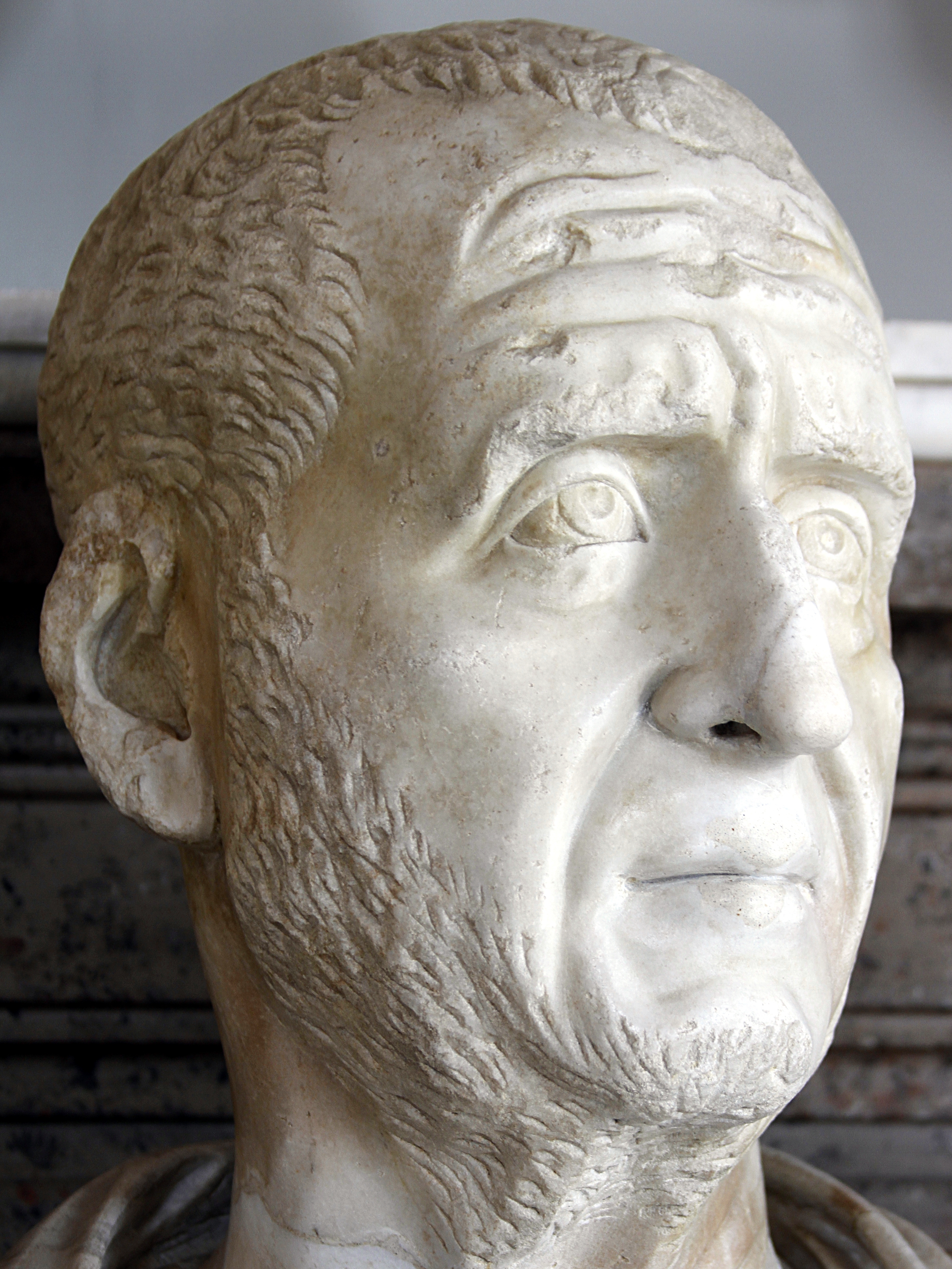
Bust of Emperor Decius (r. 249–251), a staunch persecutor of Christians (Palazzo Nuovo, Capitoline Museums, Rome)

Looking back from the early 3rd century, the Roman historian Cassius Dio concluded that the Roman Empire had descended "from a kingdom of gold to one of iron and rust" after Emperor Marcus Aurelius' death in 180 AD. Cassius' words obviously reflect the Roman senators' aversion to the Severan emperors, because other written sources and archaeological evidence indicate that the empire recovered during their reign between 193 and 235. As a surviving element of Roman republican traditions, Roman emperors had been in theory no more than principes senatus, or first among the senators during the first centuries of the monarchy. This notion of equality was manifest at the relatively high level of informality in the imperial court. Distance between emperors and Roman citizens increased and the ceremony of prostration was first documented during the Severans' reign. In 212, Emperor Caracalla granted full Roman citizenship to his all free subjects except for the dediticii, that is aliens who had been forced into submission or admitted to the empire.

The last Severan emperor, Severus Alexander, was assassinated by his own troops in 235. During the following fifty years, twenty emperors ruled the empire in quick succession, and most of them were killed by mutinous soldiers. With the emergence of the militant Sasanian Empire, Rome ceased to be the sole great power in the Near East. In the west, the new tribal confederations of the Franks, Alemanni, Sarmatians and Goths made regular incursions deep into Roman territory. The central government's instability reaffirmed secessionist movements in the periphery. In the west, a rebel provincial governor, Postumus ruled a "Gallic Empire" from 259; in the east, Queen Zenobia established an independent Palmyrene Empire in 267. Both breakaway states were destroyed by Emperor Aurelian in the 270s. As the continuous payment of soldiery could be secured only by the regular debasement of the Roman silver coins, the denarii, inflation became uncontrollable. Inflation increased the significance of taxes in kind, particularly the annona militaris—the compulsory grain supply to the army—and the angareia—the mandatory military transport.

The mid-3rd century saw a period of cooling and drought, well documented in many regions. During previous years of drought, the exceptional ecological conditions of the fertile Nile valley had helped the Roman authorities to overcome famine in other regions, but the floods of the Nile were abnormally weak from 244 to 248. Furthermore, the deadly pandemic now known as the Plague of Cyprian first hit the Mediterranean in 249. Cyprian, Bishop of Carthage, after whom the plague is named, attributed the calamities to the "old age of the world", but the pagans blamed the Christians' reluctance to worship the ancient gods. The size of the Christian communities had significantly grown in large urban centers like Rome, Antioch, Alexandria and Carthage in the early 3rd century. The Christians were outlawed for their alleged opposition to traditional Roman values, but they were only sporadically persecuted. A drastic change came with Emperor Decius' edict compelling all Romans to make sacrifices to the gods in 249. Non-compliant Christians were executed or forced into exile and the purge continued until Emperor Gallienus put an end to it in 260.

With Gallienus' successor, Claudius Gothicus the military aristocracy of the Roman provinces on the Middle Danube took control of the Roman state. Located at the intersection of overland routes connecting the empire's eastern and western part, these provinces were a principal venue of military operations and recruitment. Typically born into families of long military tradition, the "barracks emperors" were mainly extremely conservatives, but they did not hesitate to overturn traditional principles of state administration for practical considerations.

== History ==
=== Tetrarchy ===
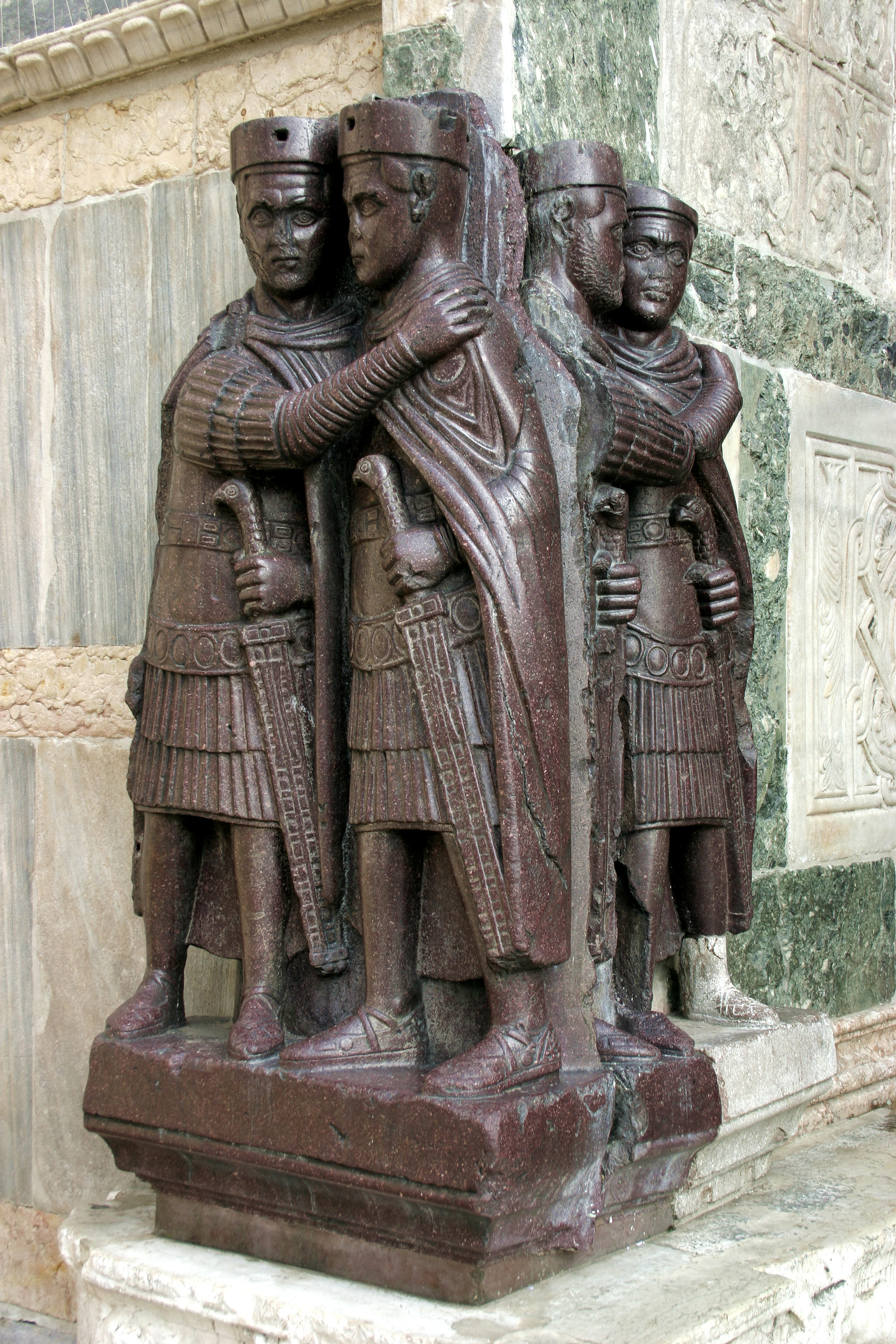
Portrait of the Four Tetrarchs (St Mark's Basilica, Venice)

The Illyrian Diocletian was a genuine representative of the soldier emperor's reformist zeal. He was proclaimed emperor at a meeting of senior officers at Nicomedia in November 284. He recognized that he could not rule the vast empire alone and made his former comrade-in-arms the Pannonian Maximian his co-ruler, first, in 285, as Caesar (or junior emperor), a year later, as Augustus. The diarchy—the rule of two co-emperors—resulted in the informal division of the empire: Diocletian mostly ruled in the east (including Illyricum and Egypt), and Maximian in the west. In 293, Diocletian instituted a tetrarchy—four co-emperors' joint rule—by appointing two Illyrian officers Constantius Chlorus and Galerius as Caesars. The tetrarchs repelled pillaging raids by the neighboring tribes and launched offensive campaigns against them. New border fortresses were built along the Danube and a selective settlement program was introduced, allowing some Carpians to move from their north-Danubian homeland to Pannonia and Moesia. The Sassanian ruler Narseh invaded Armenia, a buffer state under Roman suzerainty, and routed Galerius in 296. Reinforced by fresh troops from the Danubian provinces, Galerius defeated Narseh in Armenia and sacked the Persian capital Ctesiphon. Peace was restored when Narseh acknowledged the Romans' suzerainty over Armenia and the neighboring Caucasian Iberia, and surrendered some border provinces in 299.

The systematic codification of Roman law began with the Gregorian Code—a collection of imperial rulings—in 292. The tetrarchs' involvement in the process is not documented, but it was consistent with their attempt to stabilize the empire. The spread of Christianity and the Christians' rejection of traditional cults troubled the elderly Diocletian. In concern with Galerius, he outlawed Christianity in 303, initiating the Christians' last systematic persecution in the empire.

After recovering from a serious illness Diocletian concluded that he and Maximian had ruled long enough. They jointly announced their retirement in May 305. A new tetrarchy was established with Constantius and Galerius as the new Augusti, and two Illyrian officers Valerius Severus and Maximinus Daia as the new Caesares. The new arrangement ignored the ambitions of Constantius' son Constantine and Maximian's son Maxentius. When Constantius died in Britain in 306, his troops proclaimed Constantine his successor. Galerius recognized Constantine as the new Caesar in return for Constantine's consent to the appointment of Valerius as Augustus in the west. Maxentius rejected their agreement. He persuaded his retired father to again assume the title of Augustus and attacked Valerius in Italy, forcing him to commit suicide in 307. To restore internal peace, Diocletian, Galerius and Maximian held a conference at Carnuntum in 308. Diocletian and Galerius established a new tetrarchy recognizing Galerius and his protégé Licinius as Augusti, and Maximinus and Constantine as Caesares, but Maximian, Constantine and Maxentius did not accept their decision.

Maximian staged a failed coup against Constantine and committed suicide in 310. A year later, Galerius and the retired Diocletian died, leaving Constantine, Licinius, Maxentius and Maximinus on the scene. Constantine and Licinius quickly concluded an alliance against Maxentius whose realm separated their territories. Constantine invaded Italy and defeated Maxentius at the Milvian Bridge near the city of Rome in 312. Maxentius drowned in the Tiber and Constantine seized Italy and Africa. He reinforced his alliance with Licinius at a meeting in Milan in February 313. They restored religious freedom, abolishing all laws limiting the Christians' civil rights. Although their agreement was not formally enacted, it is now known inaccurately as the Edict of Milan. After returning to the east, Licinius inflicted a decisive defeat on Maximinus in Thrace in April 313. After their triumph, relationship between Constantine and Licinius became strained. In 317, Licinius had to surrender Illyricum to Constantine. Seven years later, Constantine routed Licinius at Chrysopolis and enforced his abdication.

=== Christianization ===
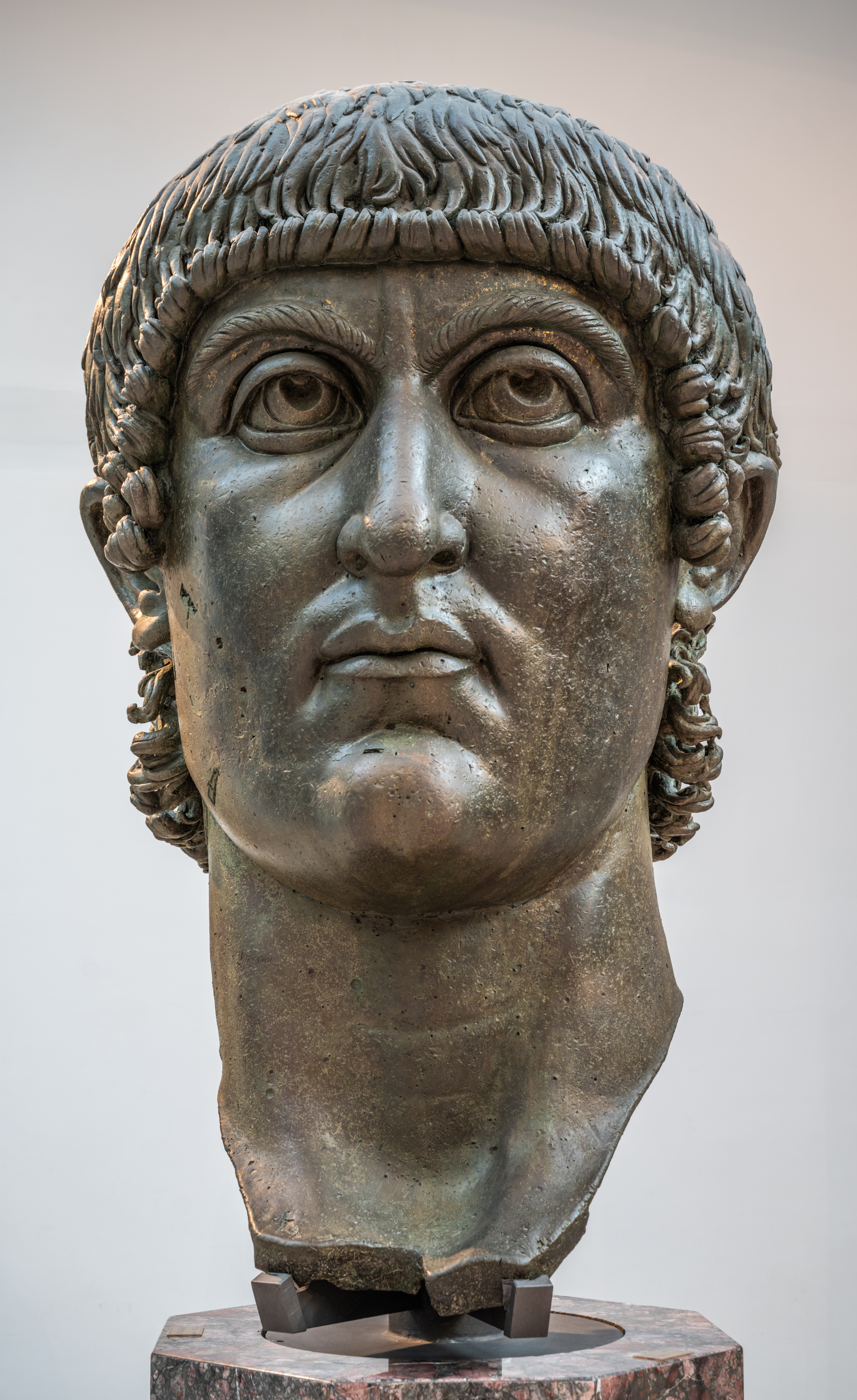
Head of a bronze colossus of Constantine (Capitoline Museums, Rome)

Constantine was not baptised until his last illness but Christian ethics influenced his legislation especially in cases when Christian values corroborated tendencies that had already existed in Roman law. He forbade the branding of slaves on the forehead, abolished penalties for celibacy, and offered financial support to poor parents to discourage infanticide. He banned gladiator games and promoted the less violent chariot racing. Unilateral divorce was limited to cases of serious crimes, like poisoning, committed by husband or wife. Constantine developed a system of client states along the Danube and Rhine taking advantage of the neighboring tribes' dependence on commerce with the empire. He established a new city on the site of the ancient Greek polis of Byzantium on the Bosporus. His "New Rome" was consecrated as Constantinople on 11 May 330. He appointed his three sons, Constantine II, Constantius II, and Constans Caesars between 328 and 333, but none of them was promoted to Augustus during his lifetime. In 335, he made his nephew Dalmatius the fourth Caesar and awarded Dalmatius' half-brother Hannibalianus with the traditional Persian royal title "King of Kings". After the Sassanian king Shapur II expelled the Roman client king Tigran VII from Armenia, Constantine decided to launch a counter-attack, but he died on 22 May 337. For Constantius believed that Dalmatius and Hannibalianus wanted to get rid of him and his brothers, he had them and their suspected supporters executed. In September 337, the three brothers assumed the title of Augustus and divided the empire at a meeting in Pannonia: Constantine received the western, Constans the central and Constantius the eastern regions.

Constantius persuaded the Armenian king Arshak II to accept Roman protection, but he mainly refrained from offensive actions against Persia. Constantine, the eldest of the three brothers, was dissatisfied with the division of the empire. In early 340, he attacked Constans to seize Italy, but died in an encounter and Constans took control of his territory. Constans fell victim to a conspiracy by a military commander Magnentius who was proclaimed emperor early in 350. A period of anarchy followed the coup in the west, lasting until Constantius overcame Magnentius and reunited the empire in 353. He appointed his cousin Gallus to rule the eastern provinces as Caesar, but Gallus' despotic measures caused massive discontent. In 354, Constantius had him arrested and executed, and made Gallus' half-brother Julian Caesar with responsibility for Gaul. After a Persian invasion of Mesopotamia, Constantius hurried to the east. He ordered Julian to send reinforcements but the Gallic troops revolted and proclaimed Julian Augustus. Constantius died of a mortal illness in Cilicia in November 361. On his deathbed, he had allegedly named Julian as his sole heir. Julian had concealed his pagan Neoplatonic sympathies, but after his ascension he openly renounced Christianity. He died fighting the Persians on 26 June 363.

Julian's successor, a Christian military commander named Jovian, abandoned Roman territories in Mesopotamia and acknowledged Persian protectorate over Armenia in return for a thirty-year peace. While marching towards Constantinople, he died of accidental carbon monoxide poisoning in February 364. The army leaders proclaimed another Christian officer Valentinian I emperor after they reached Nicaea. Fearing of a new succession crisis, the soldiers persuaded Valentinian to appoint a co-emperor. He choose his younger brother Valens, entrusting him with the administration of the eastern half of the empire. Julian's relative Procopius challenged Valens' claim to rule, but Valens routed him in Lydia in 366. Next year Valentinian fell seriously ill and made his eight-year-old elder son Gratian his co-ruler in the west. Valentinian survived, only to die of stroke after a heated encounter with Quadian envoys in the Pannonian Brigetio in 375. His generals proclaimed his younger son Valentinian II Gratian's co-emperor, likely to prevent each other from claiming the throne. As Valentinian was only four, Gratian became the sole ruler of their father's part of the empire.

Unable to resist attacks by the nomadic Huns from the east, masses of Goths—reportedly 100,000 men, women and children—gathered at the Lower Danube and sought asylum from Valens in the summer of 376. Valens granted their request because he wanted to muster fresh troops from among the Goths for a new war against Persia. The asylum seekers were settled in Thrace, but avaricious provincial officials enslaved many of them in return for low quality food staff. The local Roman army could not stop the influx of further refugees across the Danube. The despaired Goths revolted and they were joined by Hunnic raiders. Valens sought military assistance from Gratian but engaged the Goths and their allies at Adrianople without waiting for the arrival of western reinforcements. The Goths nearly annihilated the East Roman army and Valens died in the battlefield on 9 August 378. Facing the new military crisis, Gratian reactivated a previously dismissed Hispanian general Theodosius I, and appointed him as his co-emperor in January 379. Theodosius could pacify the Goths only through an unprecedented compromise in 382. He not only allowed them to settle in groups in Thrace and Dacia Ripensis as foederati, or allies, but also recognized their right to live under their own chieftains' rule.

Theodosius I was the first emperor to rule primarily from Constantinople. Early in 383 he proclaimed his six-year-old elder son Arcadius his co-emperor. Gratian refused to confirm the child's promotion, but he soon faced insurrections in the west. In June the commander of the Roman troops in Britain Magnus Maximus assumed the title of Augustus and seized Gaul. Two months later Gratian was murdered by his own guards. As Maximus quickly took control of Hispania and Africa, Valentinian could only keep Italy. In 387 Theodosius concluded a peace treaty with the new Sassanian king Shapur III. They divided Armenia. Two years later Western Armenia was incorporated into the Roman Empire, but Theodosius appointed local Armenian aristocrats to rule the new provinces as hereditary governors. Maximus forced Valentinian to flee from Italy to Thessaloniki in summer 387. After Theodosius married Valentinian's sister Galla, Maximus invaded Pannonia, but Theodosius defeated and captured him at Aquileia. Theodosius restored Valentinian as emperor in the west, but put him under the guardianship of a Frankish military commander Arbogast. Arbogast openly disobeyed Valentinian's orders and the young emperor committed suicide in 392. With Arbogast's support, a Roman pagan aristocrat, Eugenius was proclaimed emperor, but Theodosius defeated him in the Battle of the Frigidus on 6 September 394. He re-unified the Roman Empire, but he died on 17 January 395.

=== Divided empire ===
The Roman Empire after its division in 395

On Theodosius's death the Roman Empire was divided between his two sons: the eighteen-year-old Arcadius succeeded him in the east and the ten-year-old Honorius in the west. Theodosius's death is traditionally regarded as a decisive moment in the separation of the empire's eastern and western halves. Contemporaneous observers did not consider it more than a new division of responsibilities—on this occasion between two leading figures of the two emperors' courts, the Western Roman general Stilicho and the Eastern Roman praetorian prefect Rufinus. Their conflict enabled an ambitious Gothic leader Alaric I to take control of the western Balkans. Before the end of 395, the Huns launched a plundering raid against the Eastern Roman Empire from the east, and a Gothic commander in Roman service, Gainas murdered Rufinus. Arcadius' confidant, the eunuch Eutropius assumed power in Constantinople, but Gainas achieved his deposition after a rebellion of the Phrygian Gothic troops in 399. In a year, an anti-Gothic popular riot broke out in Constantinople and Arcadius dismissed Gainas with the support of another Gothic general, Fravitta. Anti-Gothic sentiments endured in Constantinople: Fravitta was executed and the Gothic military commanders were replaced by Armenians, Persians and Isaurians.

Likely the Eastern Romans' hostility to the Goths persuaded Alaric to search a new homeland in northern Italy, but Stilicho routed him at Pollentia on Easter Day 402. In 405, a Gothic chieftain Radagaisus led a mixed group of people into Italy. Stilicho enclosed and captured them with the support of Alans, Goths and Huns at Florence. In late 406, masses of Vandals, Alans, Suebi and other peoples stormed into Western Roman territory across the Rhine. Both migrations were probably triggered by the Huns' westward expansion. The Roman troops in Britain mutinied. One of their candidates to emperorship Constantine III consolidated his position and crossed the Channel into Gaul where he recruited new troops from among the invaders. As the bulk of the Roman garrisons accompanied Constantine to Gaul, raiders from Ireland launched regular attacks against Britain. Alaric resumed the attacks against northern Italy and Noricum and demanded 4,000 pounds of gold for a peace treaty. The senators preferred to resist, but Stilicho paid the tribute because he wanted to seize Illyricum from the Eastern Romans with Alaric's support.

Arcadius died in Constantinople on 1 May 408 leaving his successor, the six-year-old Theodosius II under the guardianship of the praetorian prefect Anthemius. Honorius was planning to assume authority in Constantinople, but Stilicho prevented his travel. By hiring foreign troops, Stilicho had lost the native officers' confidence and he was murdered by plotters in Ravenna in August. Stilicho's foreign troops and their families were massacred and those who escaped sought Alaric's protection. A Hunnic leader Uldin raided Thrace and captured Castra Martis, but Anthemius forced him to abandon the campaign by paying off his deputies. Alaric invaded Italy and persuaded the Senatus to proclaim a pagan Roman aristocrat Priscus Attalus emperor in November 409. The usurper Constantine III could not prevent the Vandals, Alans and Suebi from crossing the Pyrenees into Hispania. His general Gerontius mutinied and acclaimed a certain Maximus emperor. After realizing that the central government could no more control Britain, Honorius "sent letters to the cities of Britain, urging them to fend for themselves".

Attalus could not provide the Goths with sufficient food and Alaric deserted him. After Alaric's negotiations with Honorius failed, the Goths sacked Rome on 24 August 410. The plundering of the Eternal City shocked the Romans although the Goths quickly abandoned it. Alaric decided to conquer Roman Africa, but he died before the end of the year. The Goths under his rule, now known as Visigoths, elected his brother-in-law Athaulf his successor. Maximus attacked Constantine in Gaul and the two usurpers' conflict gave Honorius' general Constantius the opportunity to intervene. Maximus withdrew to Hispania and Constantius captured Constantine at Arles. A Gallic aristocrat Jovinus secured the support of a coalition of Burgundians, Alans and other peoples and had himself proclaimed Augustus in Mainz. He allowed the Burgundians to establish their kingdom in Roman territory on the Middle Rhine. The Visigoths left Italy and joined the coalition supporting Jovinus in Gaul, but after Honorius promised grain supplies to them, Athaulf captured and beheaded Jovinus. He married Honorius' half-sister, Galla Placidia who had been captured during the sack of Rome. At the wedding, he reportedly declared the renewal of the Roman Empire "by the might of the Goths" as his main purpose, but a year later, in 415, he was murdered by a retainer. His successor Wallia agreed to fight against the Vandals and Alans in Hispania in return for food supply from the Romans.

The general Constantius who had a pivotal role in the negotiations with the Visigoths married Galla Placidia in January 417. The Visigoths inflicted humiliating defeats on the Vandals and Alans, and Constantius allowed them to settle in Gallia Aquitania. Honorius made Constantius his co-emperor as Augustus in 421, but Constantius soon died of an illness. After a fierce conflict with her half-brother the widowed Galla Placidia fled to Constantinople. In response to a persecution of Persian Christians, Theodosius declared war on Persia, but a Hunnic invasion of the Balkans forced him to renew the peace with the Sassanian Empire. To prevent further plundering raids, he agreed to pay a yearly tribute of 25,200 nomismata to the Huns. When Honorius died in August 423, his courtiers proclaimed one of their number John emperor, but Theodosius acknowledged Galla Placidia's six-year-old son by Constantius, Valentinian III as Honorius' lawful successor. Theodosius appointed the Alan general Ardabur and Ardabur's son Aspar to lead troops against John, while John sent a junior court officer Flavius Aetius to the Huns to recruit mercenaries. Aetius who had spent years among the Huns as a hostage returned to Italy accompanied by Hunnic troops but by that time Ardabur had captured John. Aetius and Ardabur reached a compromise whereby Aetius acknowledged the child Valentinian III as emperor in return for his appointment as the supreme commander of the Western Roman army. Galla Placidia distrusted Aetius. She appointed a senior officer Felix to the supreme commandership and sent Aetius to Gaul. Taking advantage of a conflict between Felix and the military commander of Roman Africa Bonifatius, Aetius staged a coup and had Felix murdered. Bonifatius and Aetius would be mentioned as "the last of the Romans" by Procopius, but their rivalry was a principal characteristic of their age.

Although the Vandals and Alans conquered southern Hispania, their king Gaiseric realized that they could hardly resist attacks by the Visigoths and Romans for long. He led the Vandals and Alans across the Strait of Gibraltar into northern Africa. They defeated Bonifatius who was the military commander of Roman Africa and captured Hippo Regius in Numidia. Aspar led Eastern Roman and Italian refinforcements to Carthage, but they could not defeat the invaders. To counterbalance Aetius' power, Galla Placidia recalled Bonifatius from Africa and made him the supreme commander of the Western Roman army. Bonifatius defeated Aetius at Rimini in 432, but was mortally wounded during the battle. His son-in-law Sebastianus succeeded him as supreme commander. Aetius fled to the Huns and hired Hunnic mercenaries. On his return to Italy, Sebastianus was deposed and Aetius was appointed as his successor. He concluded a peace treaty with the Vandals, acknowledging their hold of the western regions of Roman Africa in 435. The Huns had established their new center of power in the plains along the river Tisza in Central Europe. Aetius regularly hired them to fight against the Burgundians, Visigoths and the rebellious Bagaudae of Gaul.

== Government ==
=== Monarchy ===
Diocletian introduced the official ritual of adoratio, ordering that his subjects were to kneel before him and kiss the corner of his robe. Traditional imperial titulature was expanded with titles like dominus ("lord"), and Jovius or Herculius (in reference to the gods Jupiter and Hercules, respectively). The use of the adjectives "sacred" and "divine" became common when referring anything with direct contact with the emperor, including his bedchamber and treasury. Access to the emperors was increasingly controlled by new court officials. They were often chosen from among the eunuchs who were always at the emperor's mercy, and were often unpopular. Among the new dignitaries, the primicerius was first attested in 312, the praepositus in 326. As only top bureaucrats could afford time-consuming and costly travels, low-level provincial officials rarely made contacts with their peers in other provinces.

The tetrarchs ruled the empire as members of an undivided "imperial college", but they rarely met in person. They were mainly staying along the borders and their absence from Rome gave rise to the development of new imperial centers, including Nicomedia, Serdica, Thessalonica and Trier, each provided with a palace, a hippodrome and warehouses. In 286 Diocletian moved the imperial court from Rome to Milan, and it became the capital of the western empire until 402, when Honorius moved it to Ravenna. Constantinople developed into the empire's unrivalled second capital only during the reign of Theodosius I. From the 380s, the emperors rarely held their court along the frontiers, and the eastern emperors mainly stayed in Constantinople, and their western co-rulers in Milan, Aquileia or Ravenna.

In theory, Roman emperors were autocrats whose authority to make, modify or even break laws was absolute. In practice, they made decisions based on information received from faraway officials and official reports often gave a distorted view of individual cases. (Note: Around 368, a provincial governor and three imperial envoys were executed on charges of perjury based on testimonies by witnesses who had been bribed by a fifth imperial official.) Emperors typically intervened in local affairs on the initiative of individuals or municipalities who wanted of take advantage of their intercession. Roman citizens could approach the emperor directly for seeking his opinion on specific points of law. Under the rescript system, the legal question was raised on the top of a piece of papyrus, and it was answered by the emperor, or rather one of his legal advisors on the bottom half. The Code of Theodosius cites a number of cases when the system was misused through the falsification of imperial responses.

After the Christianization of the empire the Senatus no more rewarded deceased emperors with a divine status, but the emperors were regarded as God's representatives on Earth. Official meetings began with acclamations in their honor emphasizing the divinely sanctioned nature of their rule. Even imperial images sent to the cities at the beginning of an emperor's rule were received and greeted at formal assemblies. Most Christian intellectuals embraced a modified version of Rome's imperialist ideology, claiming that God destined the empire to facilitate the spread of Christianity for the salvation of all mankind. Paulinus of Nola, Melania the Elder and a few other thinkers were more critical and denied that Rome represented an ideal civilization under God's special protection.

=== State administration ===
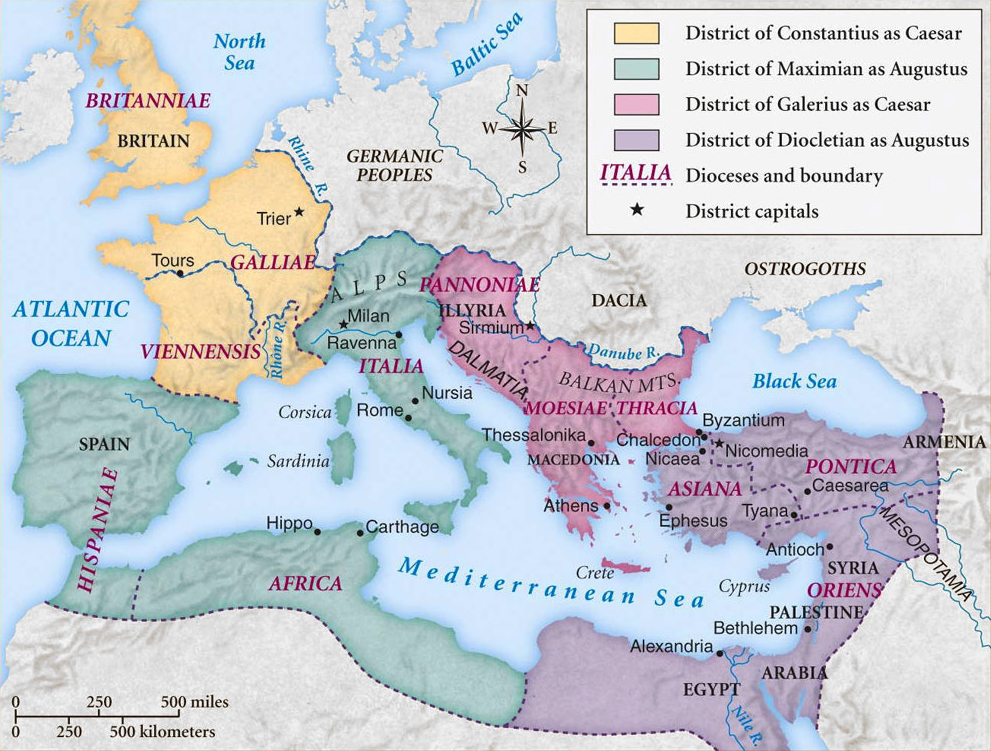
The Roman Empire under the first tetrarchy, showing the dioceses and the four tetrarchs' zones of influence post-299.

State administration underwent more structural changes during the period starting with Diocletian's ascension and ending with Theodosius's death than in the previous three centuries. By the end of the 4th century, a highly centralized bureaucratic system, employing about 35,000 officials, operated state affairs. In comparison, the central administration employed less than a thousand full-time bureaucrats during the reign of the first emperors.

The Roman Empire was divided into about 50 provinces in the 260s. As almost all provinces were split into two under Diocletian, the early-4th-century Laterculus Veronensis already listed almost 100 provinces. Diocletian grouped the provinces into 12 new territorial units, known as dioceses. Each diocese was ruled by a vicarius who reported to one of the two praetorian prefects. The head of the large Diocese of the East bore the title of Comes Orientis, while the provinces Africa and Asia remained under the rule of proconsuls who reported directly to the emperors. The praetorian prefects were the highest-ranking military, financial and judicial officials, and the appointment of the vicarii eased their administrative burdens. The maintenance of two separate hierarchies of equestrian and senatorial offices became obsolete by the end of the 3rd century. Diocletian replaced the old system with a new hierarchy of imperial officials and made the senatorial rank available to all who held high offices in imperial administration. Under the new system, civil and military hierarchies were separated. The provincial governors were no more responsible for military affairs, although they were occasionally ordered to lead a military campaign or build a fort. The traditional senatorial aristocracy mainly held offices with limited military responsibility, (Note: An offspring of a traditional senatorial family could typically serve as praetor, quaestor, proconsul, Italian provincial governor or praefectus urbi (Roma's urban prefect).) while military career became open to non-Roman soldiery. The new imperial aristocracy was based on office-holding instead of inherited wealth and family connections.

Constantine removed the praetorian prefects' most military functions, although they remained responsible for recruitment and supply of armies. With the regular appointment of five praetorian prefects, each ruling a well defined group of dioceses, new territorial administrative units, known as praetorian prefectures, came into being during his reign. A new high-ranking official, the magister officiorum, was first mentioned in 320. By the end of Constantine's rule, he was the head of the court secretariats and the scholae palatinae, or imperial guard. After abolishing the senators' obligation to reside in Rome and attend the meetings of the Senate, Constantine could grant senatorial rank generously. The establishment of a new Senate at Constantinople further increased the number of senators. To promote the development of his new capital, he granted Anatolian estates to all senators who built a private house in Constantinople. The unofficial title comes had been used in reference to the emperors' companions, but Constantine formalized it as a new rank and honor, bestowing it particularly on those in his immediate service. As a sign of the growing importance of Christianity, Constantine authorized the bishops to make judgement in civil cases between Christian litigants.

=== Military ===
Roman citizens regarded the defense of their homeland as the emperors' prime duty. They paid taxes and raised troops in return for protection against the "howling people" surrounding the Roman Empire, but the emperors were not always able to meet their expectations. Civil wars could ruin the defense system, talented barbarian chieftains could launch successful invasions deep into the empire, and catastrophic events could cause mass migrations towards the borderlands. Public opinion endorsed cruelty when dealing with the enemy and prisoners of war were customarily thrown to the beasts in gladiator shows. Emperors routinely commemorated their victories over the barbarian tribes on inscriptions and coins. Quite paradoxically, even Honorius, characterized as the "most unwarlike emperor" by historian Thomas S. Burns, was depicted as a conqueror of enemy forces on his coins.

The making of strategic decisions was the emperor's monopoly, but in many cases he was far away from military emergency. The imperial post transferred messages at a speed of about 80 kilometres (50 miles) per day, and news often reached the imperial court weeks after the events. The tetrarchy addressed this issue by allocating a separate field army to each emperor. Emperors Julian and Valens were killed in action, demonstrating that the personal command of the army could put the emperor's life at risk.

A late source with access to official records, John the Lydian asserts that during Diocletian's reign 389,704 troops served in the field army and 45,562 sailors in the navy. According to modern estimations, the Roman army was of 400,000–600,000 strong in the mid-4th century. For Roman soldiery served twenty-year terms, this army size could be maintained through the recruitment of at least 20,000 troops each year. Most soldiers were conscripts and sons of veterans were expected to serve in the army. (Note: A son of a soldier, the pious Martin of Tours could not avoid consription and served in the imperial guard for 15 years.) Imperial laws against those who mutilated themselves reveal that a military career was not attractive to all citizens. Prisoners and defeated enemies were regularly recruited, and volunteers, both Romans and foreigners, also served in the army. Although the rules changed time to time, slaves, men less than 1.65 metres (5.4 feet), heretics and urban magistrates were excluded from military service.

Most Roman soldiers were stationed along the frontiers around 260. They were organized into legions and auxiliary forces under the command of the provincial governors. The emperors were accompanied by elite troops, including 10 cohorts of praetorians and a cavalry unit known as equites singulares. Under Diocletian new cavalry units serving directly under the emperors were organized. They were called scholae palatinae. Constantine I dissolved the praetorians and formalized the distinction between the border troops, or limitanei, and the field army troops, or comitatenses. Part of the field army was organized into regional units each under the command of a magister militum. The regional units usually wintered at Trier, Sirmium, Marcianopolis and Antioch. On occasions, expeditionary forces developed into permanent detachments, like those dispatched to Africa, Britain and Isauria. The rest of the field army remained under the emperor's direct command and the imperial field army was divided into two units on the division of the empire between Valentinian I and Valens in 364. The main Roman fleet was based at Ravenna in the west, and first at Nicomedia then at Constantinople in the east. The reorganization of the army established a more flexible command structure and diminished the dependence of the frontier troops on the imperial field army in case of emergency.

== Society ==
Imperial Roman society was highly hierarchical. An individual's status depended on their wealth, occupation, family connections and career. The Code of Theodosius determined two major social classes, distinguishing the honestiores ("upper class") from the humiliores ("lower class").

== Religion ==
=== Paganism ===
The cities were the centres of the pagan cults all over the Roman Empire. The local deities were associated with the gods of the Roman pantheon, but elements of the local cults survived. Pagan cults were mainly centered around major temples and public festivals were their important elements. When praying, a pagan often used formulas that had allegedly been disclosed to the leaders of their native town by an oracle. Associations of worshippers who showed specific reverence towards one of the gods mainly existed in urban environment. Their members often had the same ethnic or professional background. Soldiers primarily worshipped Mithras or Jupiter Dolichenus and primarily eastern merchants frequented the temple of Serapis at Leptis Magna. Emperor worship was an other essential component of Roman traditions. It was closely associated with gladiator shows. Ideas about a single supreme god who governs the universe were widespread. For instance, the oracle at Claros spoke about the Highest God ruling over other deities, including the Twelve Olympians, in the 3rd century. Emperor Aurelian presented the sun god Sol Invictus ("Unconquered Sun") as the supreme deity. On the other hand, a persistent belief in the existence of myriads of demons is well documented. Individuals regularly approached sorcerers or applied magical practices to secure the support of unearthly powers although magical practices were outlawed. The regulated way of life of Egyptian priestly communities and their enthusiasm for scientific studies arrested the attention of some pagan philosophers from the 3rd century. Porphyry of Tyre praised their piety, an Egyptian group using the name Hermes Trismegistus promoted the adoption of allegedly Egyptian priestly traditions, and Porphyry's pupil Iamblichus completed a coherent polytheist theological system under the Egyptian pseudonym, Abammon.

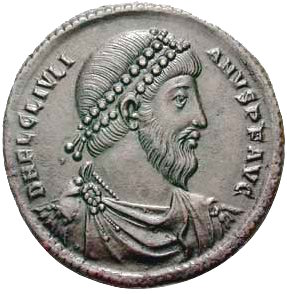
Portrait of Julian, the last pagan Roman emperor, on a bronze coin

A passionate convert to Christianity, Constantine I used harsh words when mentioning the pagans, but his legislation reflects a reconciliatory approach. In a letter to the eastern provincials, he stated that "It is one thing to take on willingly the contest for immortality, quite another to enforce it with sanctions". Only pagan practices that the Christians regarded especially immoral or offensive were banned under his rule. Examples include his ban on sacred prostitution and the demolition of pagan altars and sculptures near the Oak of Mamre where God had appeared to Abraham according to Biblical tradition. Late sources attribute the ban on sacrifices to him, but only sacrifices associated with magical practices were forbidden during his reign. Cases of religious syncretism are well documented. For instance, after the 348 earthquake in Beirut pagans started praying in the Christian church, but they did not abandon all their pagan customs. Pagan temples were first closed under Constantius II, but Julian re-opened them. Inscriptions hailed Julian as "restorer of liberty and the Roman religion". He revived the system of provincial high priests and appointed a chief priest for each city. His enthusiasm for sacrifices shocked Christians and pagan intellectuals alike. Reportedly, he sacrificed so many animals while making preparations for his Persian campaign that people worried about a shortage of cattle. His short reign could not stop the Christianization of the Roman Empire. Jovian adopted a moderate approach and only repeated bans on magical practices. The pagan panegyrist Themistius praised his religious policy for encouraging competition among people of diverse religious background.

The transformation of Roman religious life in Late Antiquity is poorly documented. Christian authors rarely recorded evidences of the survival of paganism. Pagan inscriptions were rare in the 4th century with the prominent exception of Rome, but it may have been the consequence of the transformation of practices of commemoration. In 382, Gratian abolished all state grants to pagan cults in the city of Rome, including the Vesta Virgins' salaries (. After his death, the city's pagan prefect Quintus Aurelius Symmachus could not persuade Valentinian II to allow the restoration of the Altar of Victory in the Senate House. Maternus Cynegius, the christian praetorian prefect of the East, was accused of allowing the destruction of pagan temples by fanatic mobs, but some recent authors, however, have questioned his role in events and his overall reputation as a christian fanatic and temple destroyer.

It is popularly believed the Serapeum was destroyed by Patriarch Theophilus and his followers in 392, but Alexandria had suffer a long-term backdrop of frequent mob violence during four hundred years, since the 1st century BC, so is also possible that the Serapeum was a collateral destruction because that mob violence that has no religious background (gangs consisted of christians as well as jews and pagans, no matter the religion of the member). There is evidence that pagans had taken part in citywide struggles both for and against Athanasius of Alexandria in 341 and 356.

Another widespread myth is that the successor of Theophilus, Cyril of Alexandria, ordered the murder of Hypatia, in reality Hypatia was assassinated not for religious reasons, but for political ones, as she belonged to one of the multi-confessional factions that disputed control of the city. Hypatia's death horrified Cyril, who, although he was her intellectual rival, held her in very high esteem, condemning the city for its violent nature.

When the flooding of the Nile delayed, the pagan Egyptians wanted to make sacrifices for Serapis, the deity responsible for the flooding, but the Christians destroyed Serapis' reliefs on their houses and painted crosses on their places. Theodosius I's opponent Eugenius promised to restore sacrifices to secure the support of the remnants of pagan aristocracy. After Eugenius' fall, Theodosius introduced a general ban on pagan sacrifices in 391. Bans on pagan sacrifices were regularly repeated in the 5th century, indicating that they were ineffectual.

Festivities were the most lasting elements of pagan cults. Augustine of Hippo writes of pagan dancers marching by Christian churches and stoning them as a reprisal for the Christian clergy's attempt to hinder the pagan celebration.

The end of neoplatonism occurred during the reign of Justinian I. Around 531 he banned all who had not received the orthodox/nicean baptism from teaching and serving in state administration. Their children were to be educated in Christian environment and those who resisted were banished from the empire.

Still in 591 Pope Gregory I wrote of Sardinian pagans who had bribed the island's governor to tolerate their activities.

=== Christianity ===
==== Great Persecution ====
Christians lived in peace for decades from the 260s. Official tolerance contributed to the spread of their faith, and their communities can be detected in most cities by the end of the century. Relationship between the Roman state and Christians was cordial to the extent that an Antiochene Christian group sought Emperor Aurelian's intervention against their bishop Paul of Samosata whom they had excommunicated for heresy. The legend of Maximilian of Tebessa, an early conscientious objector indicates that the number of Christian troops was not insignificant around 295. By the end of the 3rd century, clerical hierarchy had stabilized and the bishops emerged as the paramount leaders of the local Christian communities. Regarding themselves as the apostles' successors, the bishops of Rome, Alexandria and Antioch claimed the right to guide all Christians. Exorcism was an important component of Christianity in Late Antiquity. (Note: Around 251 exorcists made up around one third of the clergy in the city of Rome.) Christian exorcists were regularly approached by pagans as well, because their practices were regarded as a magical cure against demonic possession.

The peaceful period came to an abrupt end with the Great Persecution under Diocletian. Lactantius blames the haruspices—pagan priests practicing divination—for arousing Diocletian's anger against the Christians, and Galerius and his fanatically pagan mother for convincing him to take drastic measures. Diocletian outlawed Christianity on 23 February 303. His edits ordered the destruction of Christian churches and literature and the confiscation of church property. Christians were dismissed from imperial service and they were ordered to make sacrifices to pagan gods. The anti-Christian edits were not carried out consistently: in the west, Maximian and Constantius were mainly reluctant to implement them, and Constantine put an end to the purge in 306; in the east, Christians were imprisoned, tortured or executed, and the persecution lasted until Maximinus' fall in 312.

==== Legalization and Romanization ====
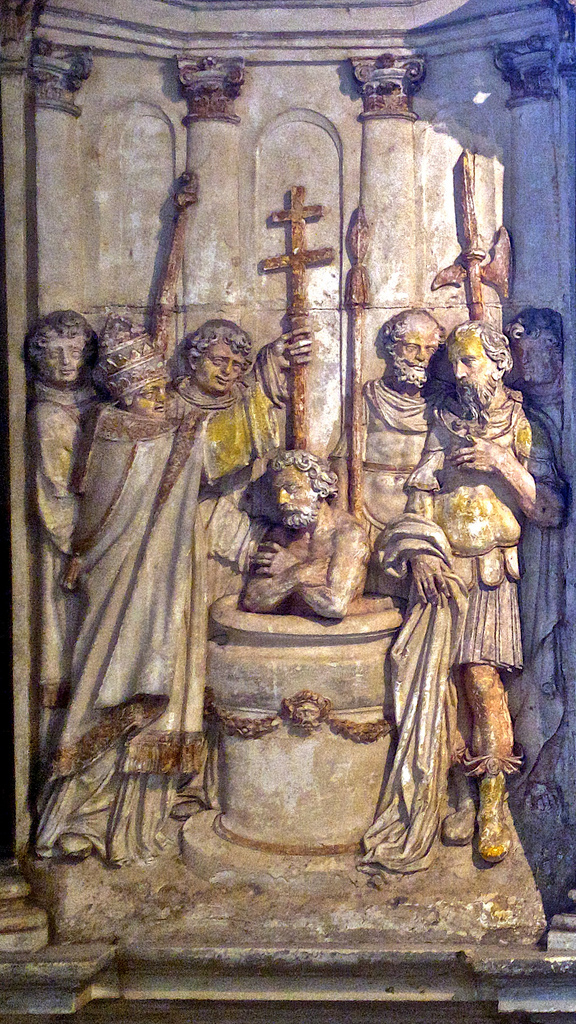
Baptism of Constantine the Great (Basilica of Saint-Remi, Reims)

The details of the Edict of Milan are known from a letter that Licinius sent to the eastern provinces. He announced the restoration of the confiscated property to the Christians, but also promised a compensation for those who had seized confiscated goods during the persecution. Constantine made lavish donations to the Christian church, including 10.5 tons of silver, 2,335 pounds of gold and 34,255 gold solidi according to a list preserved in the Liber Pontificalis. He sponsored the building of Christian churches in Rome, mainly in the suburbs, because he did not want to outrage the predominantly pagan Roman aristocracy. The construction of the Church of the Holy Sepulchre and other pilgrim churches in Jerusalem and Bethlehem started during his rule. He exempted the Christian clergy from all public duties and taxes and legitimized pious donations to the church. For clerical privileges increased other citizens' burdens, town magistrates tended to ignore them. Tax avoidance through receiving the holy orders was common and Constantine had to limit the number of clergymen to curb it.

Christianity, as historian Peter Heather underlines, was "in some senses a democratizing and equalizing force". While classical culture claimed that only the wealthy could live a truly civilized life, hagiographies praised uneducated ascetics who abandoned civilisation for the desert. According to Emperor Julian, Christianity owed its success primarily to the Christians' generous acts of charity, their special care for the dead and their attempt to live a virtuous life, because all these features were of particular importance for the impoverished masses of Roman society. In practice, Christian influence on Roman society and state was limited, but Christianity was quickly Romanized. The Christian God replaced the pagan gods in official documents and ceremonies, but few rich Christians renounced their wealth as Biblical stories proposed it. Church hierarchy followed the patterns of state administration: the bishops of the provincial capitals, known as metropolitan bishops, became the superior of other bishops in the province. Episcopal elections became controlled by the aristocracy and the local communities could no more freely elect their bishops. Constantine treated the bishops as imperial officials. His frequent interventions in church affairs set a precedent for future emperors.

==== Rigorism and Christology ====
Debates about the traditores—Christians who had given up holy books to state authorities or made pagan sacrifices during the Great Persecution—intensified in Numidia in the 310s. The more radical, mainly rural clergy believed that traditores should be rebaptized. They were known as Donatists for their bishop of Carthage, Donatus Magnus. After three synods condemned Donatist views, Constantine ordered the confiscation of their churches, but he stopped their persecution after his troops slaughtered a Donatist congregation in 321. Donatism survived and the separate hierarchy of Donatist clergy endured for more than a century.

Theological debates about the relationship between God the Father and Christ created a further schism. A Libyan priests Arius argued that Christ as God the Son was the Father's creature, while his opponents, in particular Pope Alexander I of Alexandria, maintained that the Father and the Son were identical in the Trinity. Anxious about church unity, Constantine summoned the bishops to the first ecumenical council to Nicaea in May 325. The nearly 300 bishops who assembled at the First Council of Nicaea adopted a creed emphasizing that the Son was of the same nature as the Father. For Arius and his supporters, known as Arians, did not accept the Nicene Creed, Constantine exiled them. Their banishment did not heal the schism, and the Arian exiles were allowed to return, while the most prominent anti-Arian bishops Athanasius of Alexandria and Marcellus of Ancyra were exiled. On his death bed, Constantine received baptism from an Arian bishop, Eusebius of Nicomedia.

In concert with most western bishops, Constantine II and Constans insisted on the Nicene Creed, but Constantius II and the majority of the eastern clergy sympathized with the Arians. Athanasius and Marcellus were restored to their episcopal sees, but in Constantinople Constantius replaced the Nicene Paul with Eusebius. He consecrated a moderate Arian priest Ulfilas bishop to lead a proselytizing mission among the Goths across the Danube in 341. Although seven years later Ulfilas was banned from the Gothic territory, Gothic converts continued his mission. In 338 Constantius achieved the deposition of Athanasius and Marcellus at a church council in Antioch, but they approached Pope Julius I for protection. The Pope acknowledged their orthodoxy, but they were declared heretics by 90 eastern bishops at a new synod. After anti-Arian riots in Constantinople, Constans persuaded Constantius to convoke the bishops to a new synod in 343. The Council of Serdica ordered the restoration of Paul to Constantinople and Athanasius to Alexandria, but the conflict continued because Constantius refused the Nicene creeds and rival Christian communities continued to co-exist in the eastern provinces.

Julian allowed the bishops who had been exiled during Constantius II's reign to return to their original position, allegedly because he wanted to create instability in the Christian church. He did not persecute Christians, but failed to punish those who persecuted them. Examples include the Arian bishop of Alexandria George of Cappadocia who was lynched by a pagan mob in Alexandria. He ordered the removal of the relics of a popular local saint Babylas from a former temple of Apollo. When a fire destroyed the roof of the temple and the statute of Apollo, Julian accused the Christians of arsonry and closed their church in Antioch. His order about the sprinkling of foods with water used by pagan priests during sacrifices was particularly provocative for Christians. His successor, Jovian abolished Julian's anti-Christian edicts in the autumn of 363.

Valens appointed the moderate Arian Demophilus to the see of Constantinople, but the western bishops insisted on the Nicene doctrine. Theodosius I was the first emperor to rule as a full member of the Christian community, because he received baptism during a grave illness. Born in Hispania, he had rejected Arianism. After his recuperation in 380, he issued an edict warning his subject to adhere to the Nicene Creed, but did not prescribe sanctions against those who disobeyed. He dismissed Demophilus and summoned the bishops to a new synod to Constantinople in 381. The First Council of Constantinople reaffirmed the Nicene Creed, complementing it with a statement about the full divinity of the Holy Spirit in the Trinity. The council declared that only preceded by the Bishops of Rome, the bishops of Constantinople would hold the second highest position in church hierarchy. Theodosius ordered the appointment of Nicene bishops to all eastern sees. The Goths and most other barbarians who settled in the empire remained Arians and their strong position in the imperial army secured the survival of Arianism. Their adherence to Arianism became a mark of their own ethnic identity and their attempts to have their own churches led to conflicts with Nicene bishops. Empress Justina was unable to convince the powerful bishop of Milan, Ambrose, to make available a church to the Gothic guards of his son, Valentinian II in the early 380s. Ambrose also came into conflict with Theodosius. After imperial troops massacred 7,000 townspeople in Thessaloniki in retaliation for the murder of the Arian German commander of their garrison, Ambrose forced Theodosius to do public penance.

==== Monasticism ====
Ascetics like Pachomius and Anthony who settled in remote places in the Egyptian desert originated Christian monasticism in the late 3rd century. Some of their followers lived a solitary life, others assembled at least once a week for a communal meal or prayer. Pachomius' monastic rules for his community at Tabenna set a template for further foundations, but the Cappadocian Basil of Caesarea's rules became even more popular. Ascetics of aristocratic background could cede their own houses and estates to monastic communities, like Melania the Younger who convinced her husband Valerius Pinianus to establish a monastery in the Holy Land. The ascetic Jerome was the spiritual instructor of a circle of wealthy Roman women, including Paula and her daughter Blaesilla. A previously lively girl, Blaesilla took ascetism to the extreme, and after she died, Jerome warned her mother against excessive grief.

=== Judaism ===
Jews lived in most cities in the Roman Empire. They were theoretically led by their patriarch of allegedly Davidic line until the patriarchs' lineage died out in 429. Local Jewish communities accepted the leadership of their rabbis. Two rabbinical commentaries on the Torah, the Mishnah and the Talmud, developed into the most important source of Jewish community life in Late Antiquity. Non-Jewish sympathizers, known as god-fearers visited synagogues and conversion to Judaism was not uncommon. Emperor Julian authorized the Jews to rebuild their Temple in Jerusalem, allegedly to refute Christ's prophecy on the Temple and to demonstrate the common features of pagan and Jewish sacrifices. The project failed because an earthquake destroyed the building site. Leading Christian intellectuals described Judaism as a major threat to Christianity from the late 4th century. John Chrysostom delivered sermons against Christians who regularly visited synagogues in Antioch in 386 and 387. Ambrose of Milan sharply attacked the Jews in his correspondence with Theodosius I about the destruction of a Syrian synagogue by Roman soldiers. Patriarch Cyril organized a series of pogroms against the Jews of Alexandria in 415 and 416. Judaism was never outlawed, but Christian converts to Judaism lost their property and Jews could not hold imperial offices.

The Samaritans, who were related to the Jews, lived in Palestine and they made sacrifices in their temple on Mount Gerizim. Armed conflicts between them and the local Christians were common in the late 5th century. In retaliation for their attack on Christians during Easter, their temple was transformed into a Christian church. After Justinian forbade their religious practices, tens of thousands of Samaritans fled to the Sassanian Empire. Those who remained in Palestine took up arms against the imperial government in 529, but the revolt was crushed and reportedly 100,000 Samaritans were executed.

=== Manichaeism ===
A Mesopotamian prophet Mani combined the elements of Persian Zoroastrianism with Christianity in the mid-3rd century. He died in prison in the Sassanian Empire, but his disciples spread his teaching and established Manichaean communities all over the Roman Empire. Manichaeism was a dualistic religion: its adherents distinguished a good and an evil god, and blamed the evil god for the creation of the material world. Their communities were divided into two groups: the ascetic Elects (who abstained from sex), and the Hearers (who lived a more ordinary life). Their asceticism and dualism were particularly attractive to young intellectuals, among them Augustine who adhered to their faith before his conversion to Christianity around 382. The persecution of Manichaeans started during Diocletian's reign primarily because of their association with Zoroastianism, although Manichaeism had been outlawed in the Sassanian Empire. Theodosius I renewed their persecution, describing them as followers of a sect who meet in "nefarious retreats and wicked recesses". From 382 Manichaeans could not inherit property and their religious meetings were forbidden, from the late 5th century they were sentenced to exile or death. Christians who were regarded heretics by state authorities were regularly labelled as Manichaeans. Priscillian, a Hispanian lay ascetic, who rejected marriage and promoted vegetarianism, was an early example. He and his closest disciples were executed at Trier in 383.

== See also ==
- Late Antiquity
- Migration Period
- Gothic Wars
- Historiography of the fall of the Western Roman Empire

== Sources ==
- Cameron, Averil (1993). The Later Roman Empire, AD 284–430. Fontanta History of the Ancient World. Vol. 6. Fontana Press. ISBN 978-0-00-686172-0.
- Burns, Thomas S. (2003). Rome and the Barbarians, 100 B.C.–A.D. 400. Johns Hopkins University Press. ISBN 0-8018-7306-1.
- Elton, Hugh (2018). The Roman Empire in Late Antiquity: A Political and Military History. Cambridge University Press. ISBN 978-1-108-45631-9.
- Fowden, Garth (2000) [1999]. "Religious Communities". In Bowersock, G. W.; Brown, Peter; Grabar, Oleg (eds.). Late Antiquity: A Guide to the Postclassical World. The Belknap Press of Harvard University Press. pp. 82–106. ISBN 0-674-51173-5.
- Harper, Kyle (2017). The Fate of Rome: Climate, Disease, and the End of an Empire. Princeton University Press. ISBN 978-0-691-16683-4.
- Harries, Jill (2012). Imperial Rome, AD 284 to 363: The New Empire. The Edinburgh History of Ancient Rome. Vol. 7. Edinburgh University Press. ISBN 978-0-7486-2053-1.
- Heather, Peter (2006) [2005]. The Fall of the Roman Empire: A New History of Rome and the Barbarians. Oxford University Press. ISBN 978-0-19-532541-6.
- Herrin, Judith (2020). Ravenna: Capital of Empire, Crucible of Europe. London, UK: Allen Lane. ISBN 978-1-846-14466-0.
- Kulikowski, Michael (2019). Imperial Tragedy: From Constantine's Empire to the Destruction of Roman Italy, AD 363–568. The Profile History of the Ancient World. Vol. 4. Profile Books. ISBN 978-1-78125-632-9.
- Lee, A. D. (2013). From Rome to Byzantium, AD 363 to 565: The Transformation of Ancient Rome. The Edinburgh History of Ancient Rome. Vol. 8. Edinburgh University Press. ISBN 978-0-7486-2791-2.
- Mitchell, Stephen (2017) [2007]. A History of the Later Roman Empire, AD 284–641. Blackwell History of the Ancient World. Vol. 3. Wiley-Blackwell. ISBN 978-1-118-31242-1.
- Treadgold, Warren (1997). A History of the Byzantine State and Society. Stanford University Press. ISBN 0-8047-2630-2.
- Wolfram, Herwig (1997). The Roman Empire and Its Germanic Peoples. Translated by Thomas Dunlap. University of California Press. ISBN 978-0-520-24490-0.
