= Divine Meditations =

Divine Meditations may refer to:

- Divine Meditations, 1572 work by Thomas Palfreyman
- Divine Meditations, 1622 series of poems by John Hagthorpe
- Divine Meditations, alternate title for the Holy Sonnets by John Donne

== See also ==
- Three Decads of Diuine Meditations, 1630 work by Alexander Ross (writer)
- Divine Meditations upon Several Occasions, anthology of works by William Waller
- The Art of Divine Meditation, 1634 work by Edmund Calamy the Elder
- Meditation (disambiguation)
