= Mediate =

Mediate may refer to:

- "Mediate" (song), by INXS
- Domenic Mediate (born 1982), professional soccer player
- Rocco Mediate (born 1962), professional golfer
- A common misspelling of the website Mediaite

== See also ==
- Mediation (disambiguation)
