= Charles Saltonstall =

English British sea-captain

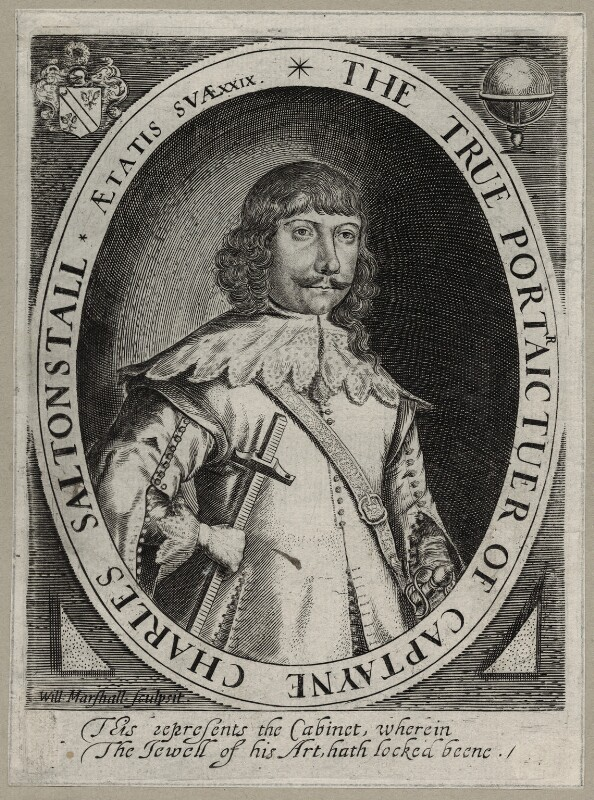
- Occupation: Sea captain

Charles Saltonstall (fl. 1642) was an English sea captain.

== Biography ==
Whiddon was probably son of Sir Samuel Saltonstall (d. 1640), and brother of Wye Saltonstall, who dedicated to him his ‘Picturæ Loquentes’ in 1631. Charles was the author of ‘The Navigator, shewing and explaining all the Chiefe Principles and Parts both Theorick and Practick that are contained in the famous Art of Navigation …’ (sm. 4to, 1642). The work is extremely rare, and in the British Museum there was only an imperfect copy of the third edition (sm. 4to, 1660?). In the dedication to Thomas, earl of Arundel and Surrey, he describes himself as a stranger to the land and his kinsfolk, many long voyages having banished him from the remembrance of both; and in the body of the work he speaks incidentally of having sailed with the Hollanders. As a treatise on navigation, the little book has considerable merit; it strongly condemns the ‘plaine charts’ then in use; urges the use of the so-called Mercator's charts, the invention of which he correctly attributes to Edward Wright, and discusses at some length the principle of great circle-sailing. He may be identical with the Charles Saltonstall who in 1640–1 wrote from Boston in Lincolnshire, condemning the inefficiency of Sir Anthony Thomas in connection with the draining of the fens and the works on the north-east side of the river Witham (Cal. State Papers, Dom. 1640, p. 102, 1 Feb. 1640–1), or with the Captain Charles Saltonstall who in January 1652 commanded the ship John in the state's service (ib. 6 Jan. 1652). A portrait of Saltonstall, engraved by William Marshall, is prefixed to the ‘Art of Navigation.’
