= Wye Saltonstall =

English translator & poet (??–c.1640)

Wye Saltonstall (baptised 1602 – after 1640) was an English translator and poet.

== Life ==
Saltonstall was baptised at St Dunstan-in-the-East in London on 3 October 1602. He was the son of Sir Samuel Saltonstall, and grandson of Sir Richard Saltonstall, Lord Mayor of London in 1597.Richard Saltonstall was first cousin to Sir Samuel, and Charles Saltonstall was apparently Wye's brother. The family originally came from Halifax. The father was a prominent man in the city of London, but subsequently, for some unknown cause, was imprisoned for thirteen years; he was released by the efforts of his brother-in-law Sir Thomas Myddelton.

Wye entered Queen's College, Oxford, as a commoner in Easter term 1619, but did not graduate; subsequently he is said to have studied law at Gray's Inn, but his name does not appear in the register. About 1625 he returned to Oxford "purposely for the benefit of the public library and conversation with learned men" (Wood). He also acted as tutor in Latin and French, but latterly fell into a state of misery and apparently poverty. He was alive in 1640, and Wood attributes to him Somnia Allegorica, by W. Salton (2nd edition 1661), no copy of which can be traced. Still more doubtful is Wood's assignment to him of the Poems of Ben Johnson [sic], junior (1672). The author, "W. S. gent.", seems to have been more highly patronised than Saltonstall ever was, and Saltonstall was probably dead before 1672.

== Works ==
Saltonstall's works are:

1. Picturæ Loquentes; or Pictures drawne forth in Characters, with a Poem of a Maid, 1631, dedicated to "adelphōi suo C. S." (probably Charles Saltonstall); another edition appeared in 1635. The "Characters", and especially that "of a scholar at the university", are satires. The "Poem of a Maid" is, according to Thomas Corser (Collect. Anglo-Poet. v. 92), the best extant imitation of Sir Thomas Overbury's "Wife".
2. Ovid's Tristia in English Verse (rhymed couplets), 1633; dedicated to Sir Kenelm Digby; other editions appeared in 1637 and 1681.
3. Clavis ad Portam; or a Key fitted to open the Gate of Tongues (i.e. an index to Anchoran's translation of Komensky's Porta Linguarum), Oxford, 1634; reprinted 1640.
4. Historia Mundi; or Mercator's Atlas … written by Judocus Hondy in Latin, and englished by W.S., 1635.
5. Ovid's Heroicall Epistles, englished by W. S., 2nd edit. 1636; subsequent editions were 1639, 1653, 1663, 1671, and 1695.
6. Eusebius his Life of Constantine the Great, in Foure Books, 1637; dedicated to Sir John Lambe, and bound up with Meredith Hanmer's translation of Eusebius's Ecclesiastical History.
7. Ovid's Epistolæ de Ponto, translated in Verse, 1639; 2nd ed. 1640.
8. Funerall Elegies in English, Latin, and Greek, upon the Death of his Father, Sir Samuel Saltonstall, knt., who deceased 30 June A.D. 1640. It is dedicated to Saltonstall's cousin, Sir Thomas Myddelton. At the end are eulogistic verses to the author by his friend Robert Codrington; it is partly reprinted in Wood's ‘Athenæ,’ ii. 677–80.
