= Meditation (disambiguation) =

Meditation is a technique to train attention and awareness, achieve mental clarity, and reach an emotionally calm, stable state.

Meditation may also refer to:

== Forms ==
- Buddhist meditation
- Christian meditation
- Daoist meditation
- Heart Rhythm Meditation
- Hinduism meditation
- Jain meditation
- Jewish meditation
- Meditation in the Ravidasi Faith
- Monastic silence
- Transcendental Meditation
- Sensual Meditation
- Sikh meditation
- Sahaja Yoga meditation
- Heartfulness Meditation (Sahaj Marg)

== Literature ==
- Meditation (writing), a discourse that expresses an author's reflections, or that guides others in contemplation
- Meditations, a series of personal writings by Marcus Aurelius, Roman Emperor 161–180 CE, setting forth his ideas on Stoic philosophy
- Meditations on First Philosophy, a philosophical treatise written by René Descartes and first published in 1641
- Meditation, later published as Passage Meditation, a 1978 book by Eknath Easwaran

== Music ==
- The Meditations, a Jamaican reggae group
- "Méditation" (Thaïs), an symphonic intermezzo from the 1894 opera Thaïs by Jules Massenet
- Méditations sur le mystère de la Sainte Trinité, a composition by Olivier Messiaen

=== Albums ===
- Meditations (Kataklysm album), 2018
- Meditation, classical album by Elina Garanca, 2014
- Meditation (Toshiko Akiyoshi Quartet album), 1971
- Meditation (George Coleman and Tete Montoliu album), 1977
- Meditation: Solo Guitar, a live album by Joe Pass, recorded in 1992 and released posthumously in 2002
- Meditation (Bobby Miller album), released 2003
- Meditations (John Coltrane album), 1965
- Meditations (Elmo Hope album), 1955
- Meditations (Mal Waldron album), 1972

=== Songs ===
- "Meditation" (Antônio Carlos Jobim song), a bossa nova song composed by "Tom" Jobim and Newton Mendonça and English lyrics by Norman Gimbel
- "Meditation", song by Booker T. & the M.G.'s, written B. T. Jones, B-side of "Slum Baby" 1969

== Art ==
- Meditation (Hayez), two paintings by Francesco Hayez in 1850/1851
- Meditation (Rodin), an 1886 sculpture by Auguste Rodin
- Meditation (Maryon), a 1910 sculpture by Edith Maryon
- Meditation, an 1885 painting by William-Adolphe Bouguereau
- Meditation, a 1918 painting by Alexej von Jawlensky

== See also ==
- Brain activity and meditation
- Dhyana in Hinduism
- Divine Meditations (disambiguation)
- Mantra
- Meditation in popular culture
- Muraqaba
- Research on meditation
- Samadhi
- Simran
