= Mediation (disambiguation) =

Mediation, in legal practise, is a form of alternative dispute resolution.

Mediation(s) may also refer to:

- Cultural mediation, a mechanism of human development
- Data mediation, data transformation via a mediating data model
- Mediation (Marxist theory and media studies), the reconciliation of two opposing forces within a given society by a mediating object
- Mediations, journal of the Marxist Literary Group
- Mediation (statistics), a concept in causal modeling
- Telecommunications mediation, a process that converts call data to a layout that can be imported by a billing system or other application
- Division by two, in arithmetic

== See also ==
- Mediativity
- Mediatization (media), the influence of mass media on society
- Meditation (disambiguation)
