= Medieval ecclesiastic historiography =

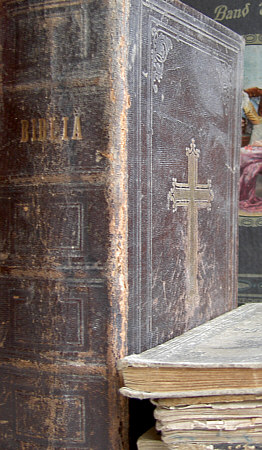
The Holy Bible was one of the main sources for medieval Historians and greatly influenced ecclesiastic historiography.

Medieval ecclesiastic historiography encompasses the historiographic production by the Clergymen of the European Middle Ages, who created their own style of developing history and passing it on to posterity. It originated with Eusebius of Caesarea, who molded a new way of writing. He gathered several followers who began copying him and propagating his model, even if indirectly.

It was generally characterized by the proposal of exposing the goals and methods of the Historians in their work. They sought to clarify their purpose and how they had managed to gather the necessary information for each of their texts. The dominant method was narration and their main goal was to pass on the information to future times. There were serious problems in making the works, the principal one being the search for documents (rare) and the various inconsistencies among the works, resulting from forgeries in many cases.

Despite its problems, the ecclesiastic historiography of the Middle Ages had its importance in the development of History as an academic discipline, according to the French historian Bernard Guenée. It also left a legacy that includes the development of auxiliary sciences such as bibliography, epigraphy, archeology, and genealogy.

== Origins ==
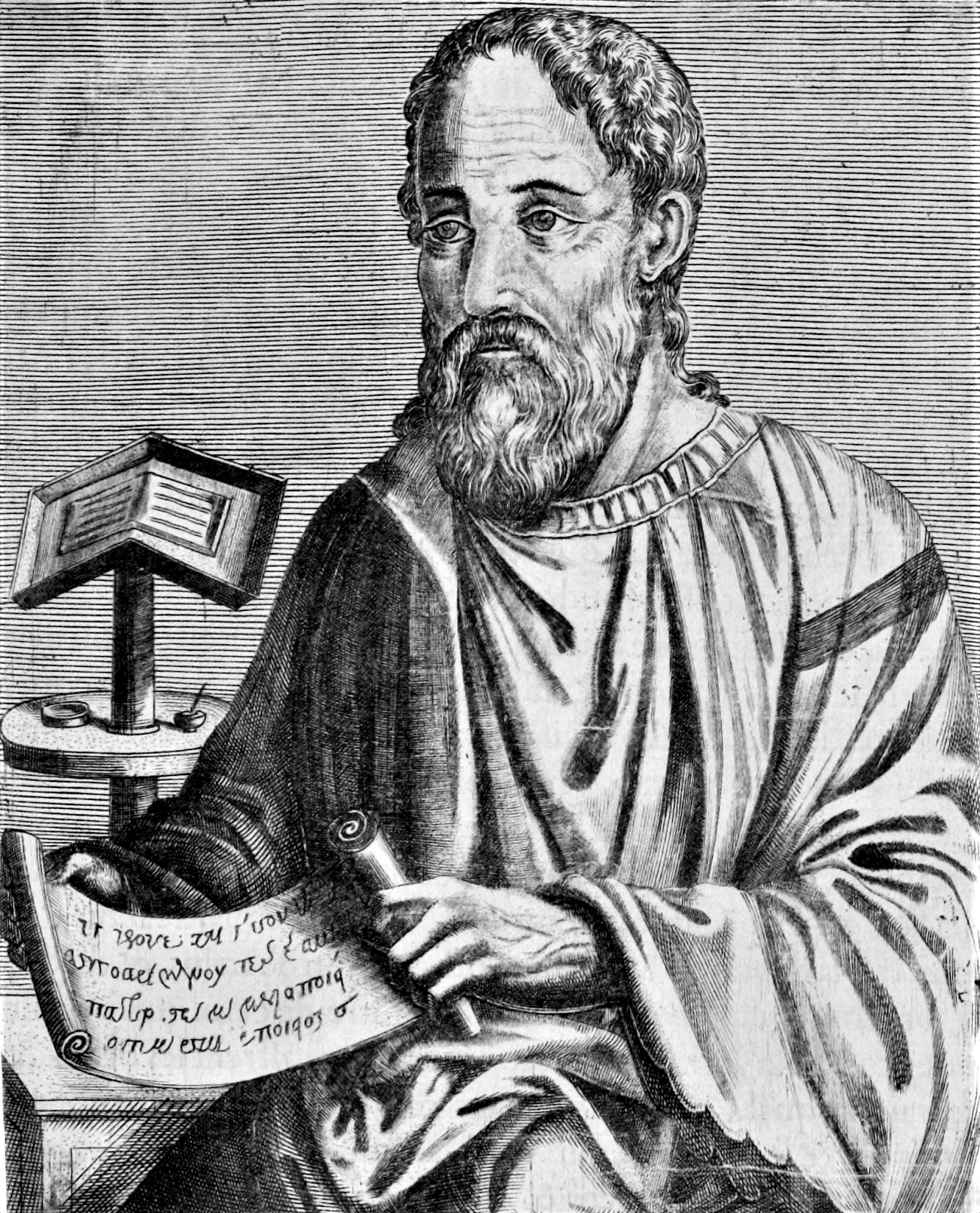
Eusebius of Caesarea is considered the "father" of ecclesiastic historiography.

The origins of ecclesiastic historiography go back to Eusebius of Caesarea, who is considered its father, and to his immediate successors: Socrates, Sozomen, Theodoret, and Gelasius, the bishop of Caesarea Maritima. At first, it was possible to compare the new branch of historiography that was forming to political history, and it was possible to draw an analogy between the battles and treatises of the latter with the themes of persecution and heresy in Eusebius' work.

Eusebius was the main recognizer of the importance of documents for the development of history while adopting several aspects of Jewish influence in his works. The most relevant of these was "succession," which had been created through the thinking of the rabbis and developed with strong Greek influence.

Another line for ecclesiastic historiographic production was that created by Philip of Side, around 430 A.D. His work Christian History began with the origin of the world (explained through the theory of creationism) and included many diverse subjects beyond history, such as geography, the natural sciences, and mathematics. (Note: In The Classical Roots of Modern Historiography, Arnaldo Momigliano compares Philip of Side's work to a "Christian encyclopedia in history format", mainly because of the inclusion of such diverse topics in the same book, but always with a Christianized view of such topics.) However, Philip failed to garner followers and was soon forgotten.

However, while ascending, ecclesiastic historiography did not end the cycles of other types of historiography. (Note: Political history, in particular, continued to be developed continuously and was recognized by all the ecclesiastic historians of late antiquity, including Eusebius of Caesarea himself.) Political history, in particular, continued to be developed continuously and was recognized by all the ecclesiastic historians of late antiquity, including Eusebius of Caesarea himself. Rufinus' translation of Church History from Greek into Latin is considered the starting point of ecclesiastic writing in the Western Roman Empire, since before this it had been developed only in the Eastern Roman Empire. The impact of the translation made by Rufinus was so great that the work became extremely popular. It was known that medieval historians such as Gregory of Tours, Beda, and Augustine were familiar with it.

== Goals and methods ==
One of the main characteristics of ecclesiastic historiography is the common presence of goals and methods in the prologue of the works. Through the analysis of the prologues of medieval history books, it is possible to understand how the work was produced, for what purpose it was developed, to whom it was intended, and what methods were applied in its making.

The key objective of the Clergymen was to transmit historical knowledge to posterity, but only events worthy of remembrance were to appear in the works produced, and they usually dealt with subjects such as biographies or wars. (Note: An exception was the work of Gerard of Wales (Topographia hibernica), which was especially intended to study the customs of the peoples of present-day Ireland.) As it happened with the liturgy of the Catholic Church, history would become a tool of memory.

The main method for conveying history was the narration of events, and it was very common to use works of history to convey examples of reputable men that should be followed by others. The work of Valerius Maximus, the Book of Memorable Doings and Sayings, is an example of this compilation made several times. Therefore, it would be up to the historian to create someone's glory or infamy, and for this very reason, several works of history started to be "commissioned" by nobles in the same period (so that their names would not be forgotten).

== Sources ==
=== Written ===
The written sources used by medieval historians came mainly from libraries and archives, and were used especially for studies on "ancient times". (Note: Gautier Map considered "modern times" to be the period that could be covered by orality (at most one hundred years), while "ancient times" would be those that comprised all phases before this.)

During the Middle Ages, libraries were not yet as rich as they would become during the Renaissance (to a great degree after the spread of the press throughout Europe in the 15th century). Only a few books were available and in small quantities, very few being history books. The main source for many works was the Bible, which had been recommended by Cassiodorus to all libraries in the sixth century, in addition to Eusebius of Caesarea's Church History. Content not covered by the Holy Bible and Eusebius' work was hardly found in ordinary libraries, and its diffusion was extremely limited.

The archives were as rustic as the libraries, and there were several problems with the conservation of manuscripts. Besides the problem of conservation, there was also a great obstacle imposed by the lack of classification, as well as the lack of access (many historians could only turn to the archive of the institution to which they belonged). One of the best-known archives is that of Reims, which was organized as early as the 9th century by Hincmar. Only from the 11th century onwards did the episcopal archives begin to be inventoried, and only with the advance of royal power in the 14th century did the need for classification become clear.

=== Oral ===
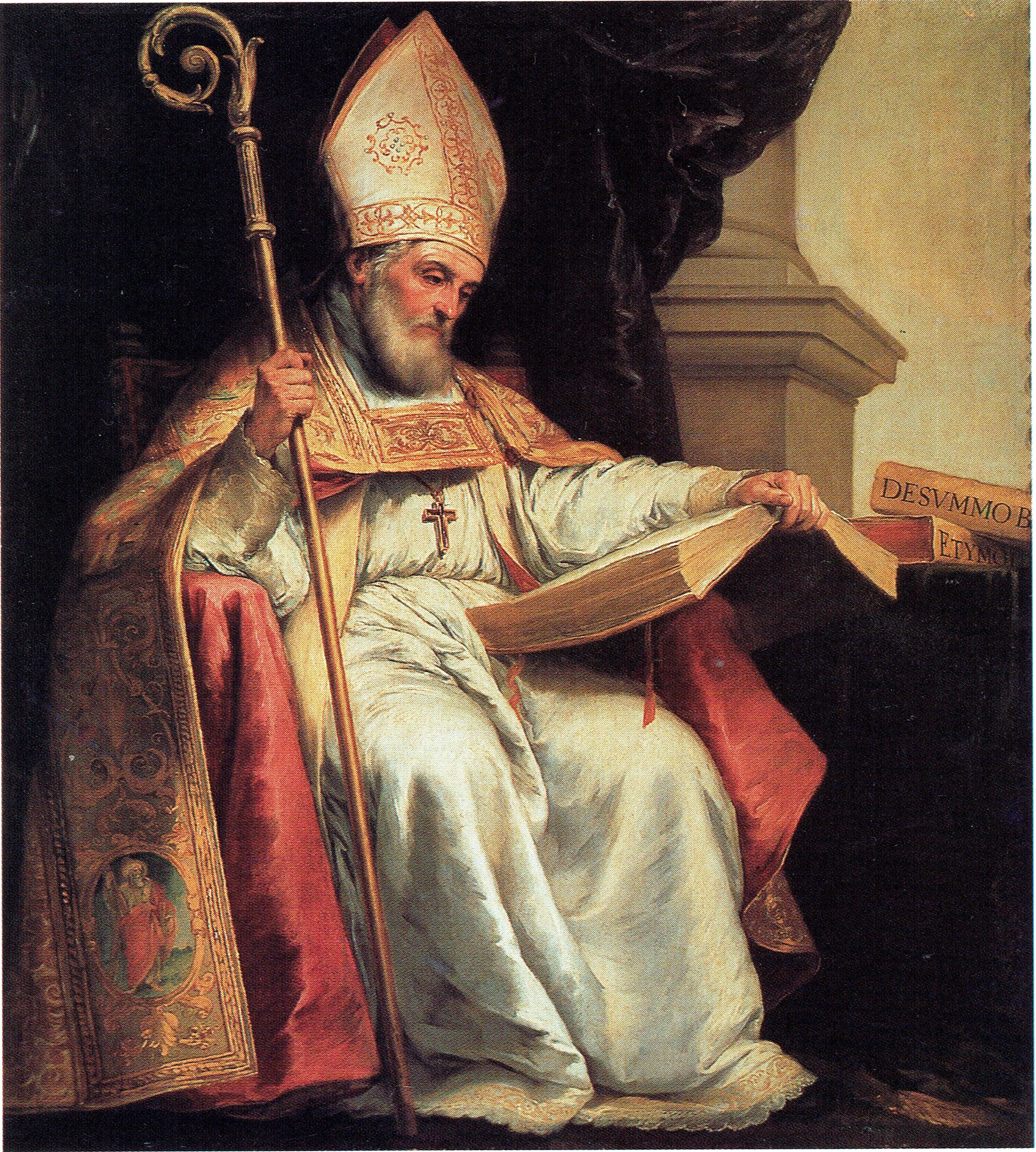
Isidore of Seville was the precursor of the use of oral sources in the works of ecclesiastic historiography.

The oral sources were those coming from the testimony of people who had witnessed the events narrated in the works. Isidore of Seville is considered a precursor in encouraging the use of oral sources, because of the great influence he had on later historians. According to Isidore's teachings, the oral tradition was followed, and the most reliable oral sources were used, which were direct testimonies. In addition, the search for criticism of testimonies is notorious, since confirmation of these testimonies was sought in others (then considered "secondary"). When it was not possible to use direct testimonies, historians looked for support for their books in popular beliefs, ancient traditions, and songs that circulated in the medieval world.

=== Auxiliary ===
Auxiliary sources were those that came from monuments, ruins, sculptures, and buildings, for example. Although there were not yet adequate instruments for exploring the past through the legacies of other times that had already passed (archeology had not yet been developed, and only in the 14th century would epigraphy be considered an auxiliary science of history), the importance of this type of source was already considered.

Among the buildings most sought after by medieval historians were the tombs of important men, for these could reveal information of the most diverse nature, from their genealogy to their biography itself. A clear example of such importance is the monastery of Saint-Denis which gathered the tombs of the kings of the Merovingian and Capetian dynasties respectively.

=== Forgery ===
The falsification of documents was a recurring attitude in medieval history and, for a long time, it hurt historians, especially those who did not have a very acute critical sense. However, at the same time that there were historians without this skill, others were already dealing with evaluating and analyzing the sources; After comparing them with other sources, they looked for differences and similarities.

This often led to an overvaluing of the "authority of the source", which was the search for a "guarantor" for the evaluation of a text as a historical source. This happened several times during the Medieval Era and examples of this are the book on the history of Genoa between the years 1100 and 1152, which was elevated to the level of a highly reputable source by the consuls of the city, and the chronicle of Rolandino of Padua, which vested itself with authority only when it was validated by the scholars of the University of Padua.

Another major problem was the influence of copyists who, in numerous historical works, always ended up "adding" some information that was not available in the original text they used. In short, the criterion for the quality of historiographical production was not the truth, but rather the authenticity established by authorities who obeyed a kind of hierarchy. (Note: The scale started with the author himself (if he was better known, the text had more chance of being authentic, if not, then it had less chances), then it went through the approval of princes, which was lower than the approval of kings, who in turn had less authority in approving texts than the Catholic Church, and finally, among the texts approved by the church, the most reputable was the one that was the oldest.)

== Genres ==
The moment history manages to gain its autonomy from the other sciences, its genres (known as historical genres) emerge: annals and chronicles are known for providing brief descriptions of events and related facts by year, while history sees style and rhetoric being highly valued (there is still a tendency to look to historians of antiquity such as Suetonius and Salustius). Later, from history, other genres would derive such as providential history (which was guided by theology), scholarly history (used by clerics and chanceries), political history, and "romance" history (which gains readers from social groups other than the clergy, such as the nobility).

There were also a large number of works made to order, which were requested by nobles who wanted to keep their memory alive for posterity. An example of this is the work that appears on the occasion of the death of William the Marshal in 1219, which was commissioned by his son (to keep his father's memory alive). This genre would later also make room for works of genealogy.

== Acceptance ==
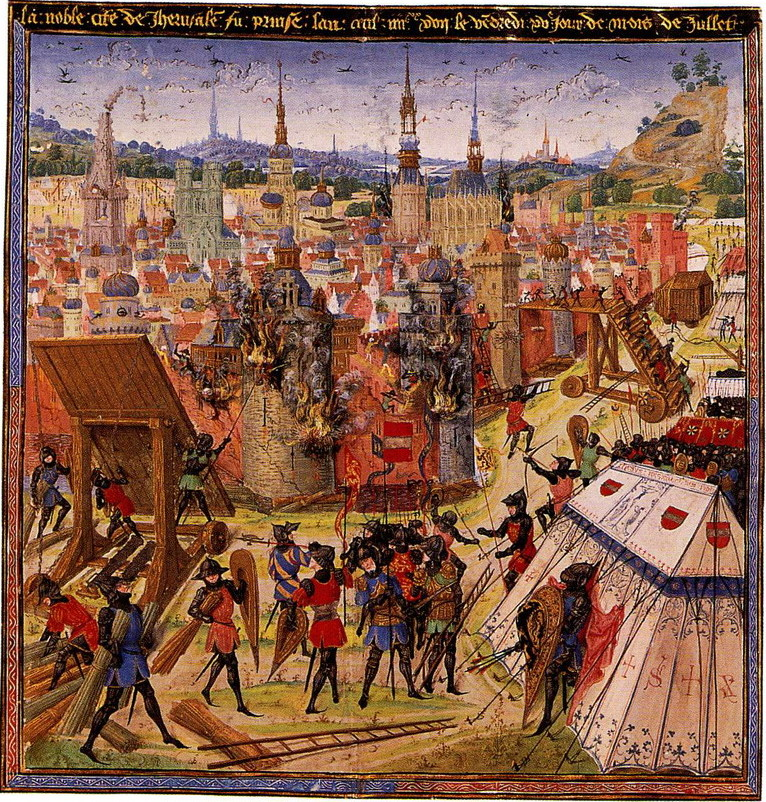
The Crusades strongly influenced the "romance" genre of history in ecclesiastic historiography.

During the Medieval Age, ecclesiastic production was well-received and diverse. One of the genres with the greatest popular appeal was the "romance" history of the Crusades, whose books recounted the adventures of the knights of Christianity in the distant lands of the Middle East. However, they were often written with little or even no historical accuracy, which may relativize their use as a source. Among the texts of this kind is the "Song of Antioch."

The mendicant orders were also great recipients and repeaters of ecclesiastic historiography, adapting it according to their needs. The Dominicans focused their production on scholarly manuals and were more concerned with preaching than historical research. The Franciscan order, on the other hand, followed a similar line to the Dominicans and sought only "beautiful stories" for preaching in front of people of "less culture".

Nowadays, the historiographical production of the Medieval Era is often viewed with contempt, and those responsible for this view are the humanists of the Renaissance. This is thought to be because the view held is that, until then, history was a mere "servant of religion" and auxiliary to the Catholic liturgy. One of the main inaccuracies of medieval texts are the illustrations: illustrators and engravers drew biblical characters as clerics and knights of the Medieval Era and thus incurred serious anachronism.

== Legacy ==
Ecclesiastic historiography has a very important legacy for the further development of history as an academic discipline. This importance can be gauged by the great presence of works created within this historiographic movement, such as the Histories of Gregory of Tours (which was a very important source for the understanding of the sixth century in the Frankish Kingdom), the Ecclesiastical History of the English People by Bede and, later, Vincent de Beauvais' Historial Mirror and the Great Chronicles of France. The legacy of ecclesiastic historiography is summed up in the following quote by the French historian Bernard Guenée:

It is during the Middle Ages that the techniques that we are proud to possess today began to be developed. Perhaps we deserve to be branded ungrateful for having allowed our arrogance and ignorance to mercilessly expose the gaps in medieval scholarship. If possibly today's historians are giants, perhaps those of the Middle Ages would have been dwarfs. But today's giants are sitting on the shoulders of yesterday's dwarfs.

== See also ==
- Scriptorium.

== Bibliography ==
- BASCHET, Jérôme (2006). A Civilização Feudal. Do Ano 1000 à Colonização da América. São Paulo: Globo. ISBN 8525041394
- CAIRE-JABINET, Marie-Paule (2003). Introdução à Historiografia. Bauru: EDUSC. ISBN 8574601640
- LeGOFF, Jacques; SCHMITT, Jean-Paul (2006). Dicionário Temático do Ocidente Medieval. 2. Bauru: EDUSC. ISBN 8574601489
- MOMIGLIANO, Arnaldo (2004). As Raízes Clássicas da Historiografia Moderna. Bauru: EDUSC. ISBN 8574602256
- SHAHÏD, Irfan (1984). Byzantium and the Arabs in the Fourth Century (em inglês). [S.l.]: Dumbarton Oaks. ISBN 0884021165
