= John Hagthorpe =

English poet

John Hagthorpe (fl. 1627) was an English poet. He may also have been a naval captain, as he claimed that his family were the only Hagthorpes in England, and a contemporary Captain John Hagthorpe is documented.

== Life ==
Hagthorpe was the son of Rowland Hagthorpe (died 1593) of Nettlesworth in the parish of Chester-le-Street, County Durham, by his first wife, Clare, daughter of Sir Ralph Hedworth, of Harraton in the same county. He was baptised 12 February 1585. In his writings he refers to the time when he lived in Scarborough Castle, Yorkshire. He married Judith, daughter of Anthony Wye, who had a lawsuit in 1605 with Elizabeth Saltonstall, mother of Wye Saltonstall, the poet.

== Reduction of property ==
In 1607 he sold his manor and estate of Nettlesworth to John Claxton. On 27 February 1608, being then of Whixley, Yorkshire, he surrendered certain copyhold lands in Chester-le-Street to the use of Henry Thompson and Jane his wife, who was his father's widow. In 1611 license was granted to him and Judith, his wife, to alienate to Francis Wright the half of Greenbury Grange in the parish of Scorton, near Scarborough. He does not seem to have profited by these transactions, for he complains bitterly in the dedication of his ‘Divine Meditations’ to James I of poverty caused by lawsuits in which he had been worsted. Fearing that he might be compelled to emigrate with his family to Virginia, he entreated the king to procure for his son a presentation to Charterhouse School. He added that there was not a man named Hagthorpe in England 'beside myself and mine.' If this statement be literally true he must be identical with the Captain John Hagthorpe who, on 22 April 1626, was certified by Robert Hemsworth as a fit person to command 'one of the ships to waft the cloth fleet to the East land'. During the same year Captain Hagthorpe did good service in protecting the Hull ships bound for Holland against the attacks of the 'Dunkirkers'. He had also taken part in the Cádiz expedition of 1625, and with four other captains petitioned Duke of Buckingham on 20 September 1626 for payment of the king's gratuity of one hundred nobles. A week later he was charged by William Hope, gunner of the Rose of Woodbridge, with illegally selling ship's stores, a course he was probably driven to adopt on account of the persistent neglect of the admiralty to furnish him with victuals and beer.

== Poetry ==
John Hagthorpe the poet was the author of: 1. ‘Divine Meditations and Elegies,’ 16mo, London, 1622. A selection from this tiny volume was presented to the Roxburghe Club in 1817 by Sir S. E. Brydges under the title of ‘Hagthorpe Revived; or Select Specimens of a forgotten Poet.’ 2. ‘Visiones Rervm. The Visions of Things, or foure Poems,’ 16mo, London, 1623, dedicated to Charles, prince of Wales, to whom he renews the suit addressed in his former volume to the king. 3. ‘Englands-Exchequer, or a Discovrse of the Sea and Navigation, with some things … concerning plantations,’ &c., 4to, London, 1625, an eloquently written prose tract, with poetry interspersed, inscribed to the Duke of Buckingham. He has also laudatory verses prefixed to Captain John Smith's ‘Sea Grammar,’ 1627. In the sale catalogue of William Roscoe's library (1816) ‘The Divine Wooer; composed by I. H.,’ 8vo, London, 1673, is attributed to Hagthorpe.
