= Christian Frederic Crusé =

- Born: June 27, 1794; Philadelphia
- Died: October 5, 1865 (aged 71); New York City
- Education: University of Pennsylvania
- Employer: General Theological Seminary; University of Pennsylvania

Christian Frederic Crusé (June 27, 1794 – October 5, 1865) was a minister of the Protestant Episcopal Church, born June 27, 1794, in Philadelphia, of Lutheran parentage. He entered the University of Pennsylvania in 1812, and graduated Jan. 10, 1815, with distinguished honors. He was appointed professor in the University in 1831, and resigned in 1833. He was a teacher for several years at Dr. Muhlenberg's celebrated boys' school on Long Island. He was ordained by bishop White about 1822; became rector of Trinity Parish, Fishkill, N.Y., in April, 1846, but resigned the cure in 1851, and afterwards had no parish. He soon after removed to the General Theological Seminary, where, as librarian, he had ample opportunities for those studies in which he was so successful. In the ancient languages — Syriac, Hebrew, and Greek — Dr. Cruse was very well informed. He translated and edited Eusebius's Church History, and his edition is the best in English. He died in New York October 5, 1865.
