= Ecclesiastical History (Eusebius) =

4th-century Christian chronology by Eusebius

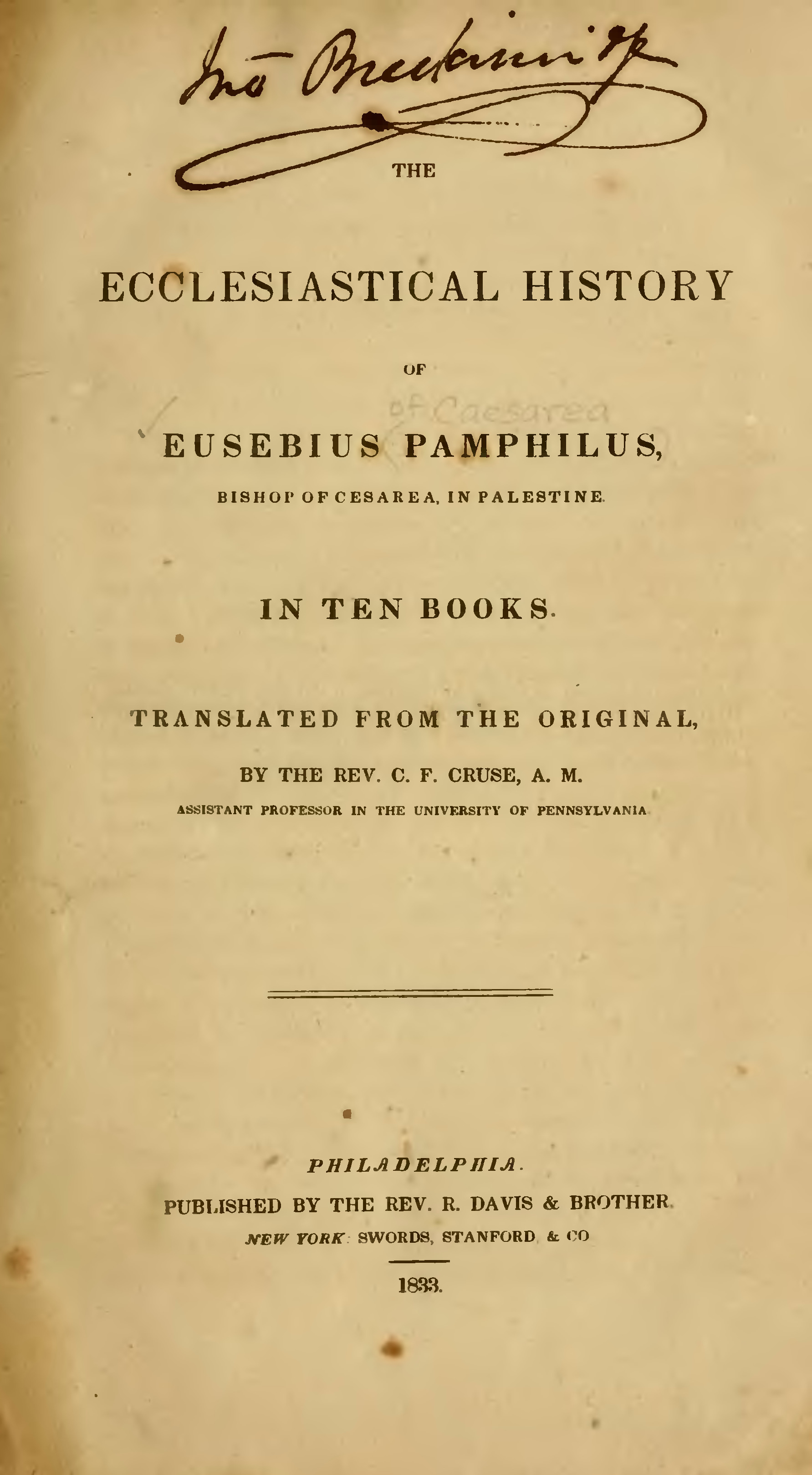
An 1842 edition of Eusebius's Ecclesiastical History

The Ecclesiastical History (Ancient Greek: Ἐκκλησιαστικὴ Ἱστορία, Ekklēsiastikḕ Historía; Latin: Historia Ecclesiastica), also known as The History of the Church and The Church History, is a 4th-century chronological account of the development of Early Christianity from the 1st century to the 4th century, composed by Eusebius, the bishop of Caesarea. It was written in Koine Greek and survives also in Latin, Syriac, and Armenian manuscripts.

== Contents ==
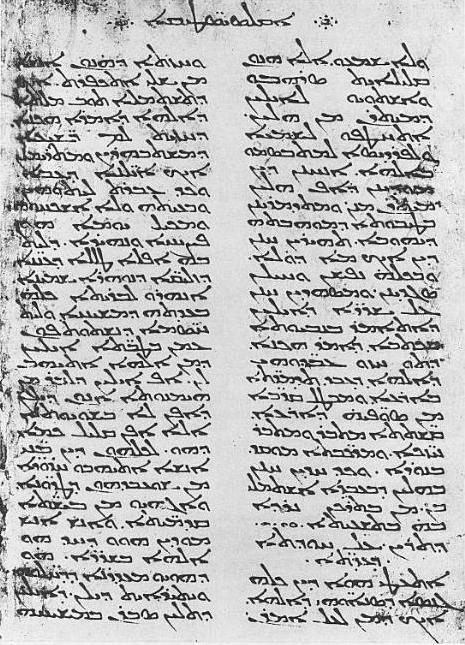
Syriac manuscript of Ecclesiastical History, X,I,4-II,1 (National Library of Russia, Codex Syriac 1)

The result was the first full-length narrative of the world history written from a Christian point of view. According to Paul Maier, Herodotus was the father of history and Eusebius of Caesarea is the father of ecclesiastical history. In the early 5th century, two advocates in Constantinople, Socrates Scholasticus and Sozomen, and a bishop, Theodoret of Cyrrhus, Syria, wrote continuations of Eusebius's account, establishing the convention of continuators that would determine to a great extent the way history was written for the next thousand years. Eusebius's Chronicle, which attempted to lay out a comparative timeline of pagan and Old Testament history, set the model for the other historiographical genre, the medieval chronicle or universal history.

Eusebius had access to the Theological Library of Caesarea and made use of many ecclesiastical monuments and documents, acts of the martyrs, letters, extracts from earlier Christian writings, lists of bishops, and similar sources, often quoting the originals at great length so that his work contains materials not elsewhere preserved.

It is therefore of historical value, though it pretends neither to completeness nor to the observance of due proportion in the treatment of the subject-matter. Nor does it present in a connected and systematic way the history of the early Christian Church. It is to no small extent a vindication of the Christian religion, though the author did not primarily intend it as such. Some scholars, while admitting that his judging of persons or facts is not entirely unbiased, push back on claims of intentional fabrication as "quite unjust."

== Plan of the work ==
Eusebius attempted according to his own declaration (I.i.1) to present the history of the Church from the apostles to his own time, with special regard to the following points:

1. the successions of bishops in the principal sees;
2. the history of Christian teachers;
3. the history of heresies;
4. the history of the Jews;
5. the relations to the heathen;
6. the martyrdoms.

He grouped his material according to the reigns of the emperors, presenting it as he found it in his sources. The contents are as follows:

- Book I: detailed introduction on Jesus Christ
- Book II: The history of the apostolic time to the destruction of Jerusalem by Titus
- Book III: The following time to Trajan
- Books IV and V: approximately the 2nd century
- Book VI: The time from Septimius Severus to Decius
- Book VII: extends to the outbreak of the persecution under Diocletian
- Book VIII: more of this persecution
- Book IX: history to Constantine's victory over Maxentius in the West and over Maximinus in the East
- Book X: The reestablishment of the churches and the rebellion and conquest of Licinius.

== Chronology ==
Andrew Louth has argued that the Ecclesiastical History was first published in 313. In its present form, the work was brought to a conclusion before the death of Crispus (July 326), and, since book x is dedicated to Paulinus, Archbishop of Tyre, who died before 325, at the end of 323 or in 324. This work required the most comprehensive preparatory studies, and it must have occupied him for years. His collection of martyrdoms of the older period may have been one of these preparatory studies.

== Attitudes of the author ==
Eusebius blames the calamities which befell the Jewish nation on the Jews' role in the death of Jesus. This quote has been used to attack both Jews and Christians (see Antisemitism in Christianity).

… that from that time seditions and wars and mischievous plots followed each other in quick succession, and never ceased in the city and in all Judea until finally the siege of Vespasian overwhelmed them. Thus the divine vengeance overtook the Jews for the crimes which they dared to commit against Christ.

Eusebius levels a similar charge against Christians, blaming a spirit of divisiveness for some of the most severe persecutions.

But when on account of the abundant freedom, we fell into laxity and sloth, and envied and reviled each other, and were almost, as it were, taking up arms against one another, rulers assailing rulers with words like spears, and people forming parties against people, and monstrous hypocrisy and dissimulation rising to the greatest height of wickedness, the divine judgment with forbearance, as is its pleasure, while the multitudes yet continued to assemble, gently and moderately harassed the episcopacy.

He also launches into a panegyric in the middle of Book X. He praises the Lord for his provisions and kindness to them for allowing them to rebuild their churches after they have been destroyed.

== Criticism ==
The accuracy of Eusebius's account has often been called into question. In the 5th century, the Christian historian Socrates Scholasticus described Eusebius as writing for "rhetorical finish" in his Vita Constantini ("Life of Constantine") and for the "praises of the Emperor" rather than the "accurate statement of facts." (Note: "Also in writing the life of Constantine, this same author has but slightly treated of matters regarding Arius, being more intent on the rhetorical finish of his composition and the praises of the emperor, than on an accurate statement of facts".) The methods of Eusebius were criticised by Edward Gibbon in the 18th century. In the 19th century Jacob Burckhardt viewed Eusebius as a liar, the "first thoroughly dishonest historian of antiquity." Ramsay MacMullen in the 20th century regarded Eusebius's work as representative of early Christian historical accounts in which "Hostile writings and discarded views were not recopied or passed on, or they were actively suppressed... matters discreditable to the faith were to be consigned to silence." As a consequence this kind of methodology in MacMullen's view has distorted modern attempts, (e.g. Harnack, Nock, and Gustave Bardy), to describe how the Church grew in the early centuries. Arnaldo Momigliano wrote that in Eusebius's mind "chronology was something between an exact science and an instrument of propaganda".

== Translations ==
The work was translated into other languages in ancient time (Latin, Syriac, Armenian). Codex Syriac 1 housed at the National Library of Russia is one of the oldest Syriac manuscripts, dated to the year 462.

=== English translations ===
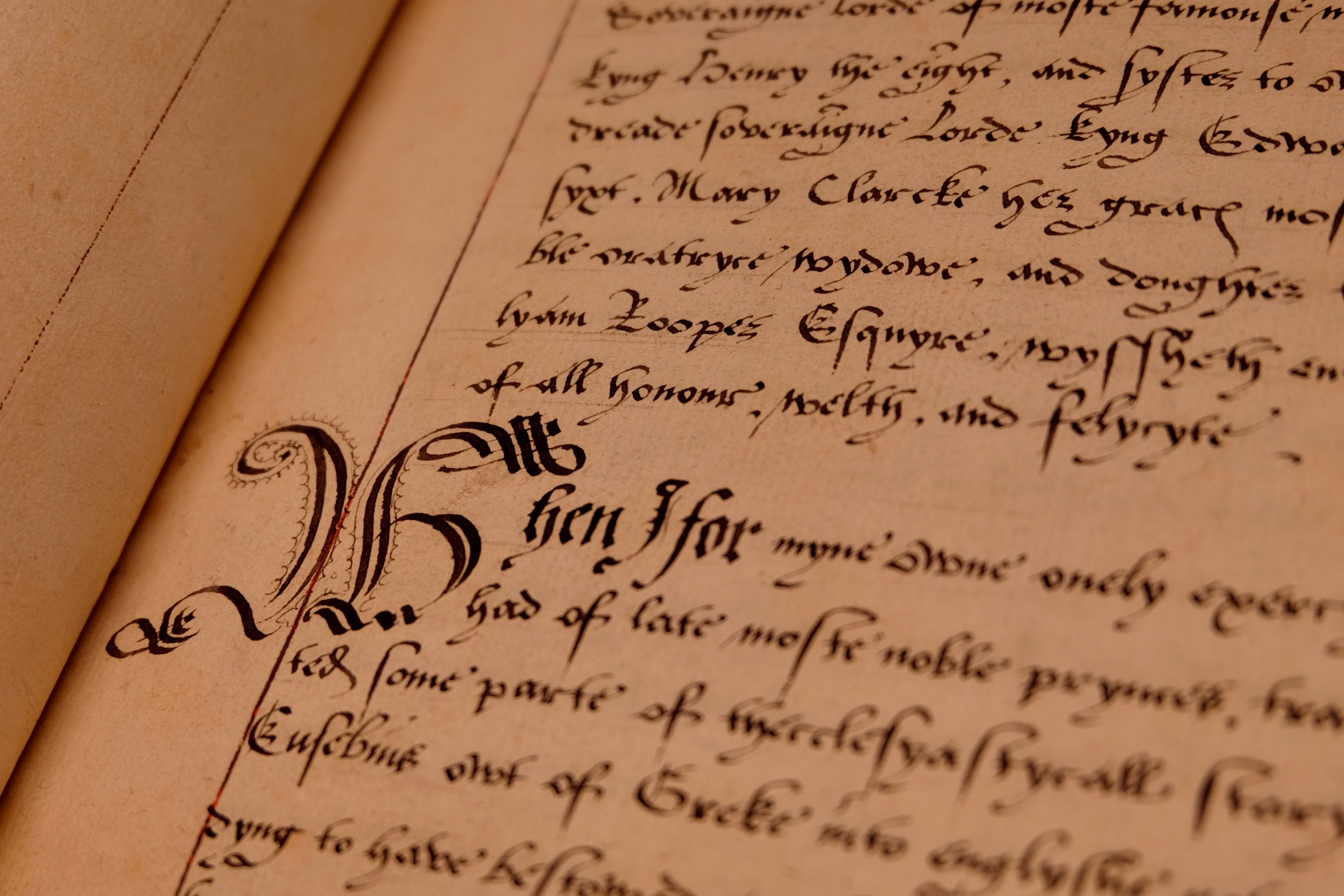
A page from the prefatory material of Mary Basset's translation of the Ecclesiastical History

The first partial English translation was by Mary Basset, the granddaughter of Sir Thomas More, who worked on Eusebius's first five books between 1544 and 1553 and presented her manuscript to Mary Tudor. The first printed English version was by Meredith Hanmer in 1576 and then subsequently much reprinted.

- Basset, Mary, ed. (1544–1553), Thecclesyastycall Storye (Harley MS 1860).
- Hanmer, Meredith, ed. (1576), The Auncient Ecclesiasticall Histories of the First Six Hundred Years after Christ, Written in the Greek Tongue by Three Learned Historiographers, Eusebius, Socrates, and Euagrius, London.
- Crusé, Christian Frederic; et al., eds. (1833), The Ecclesiastical History of Eusebius Pamphilus, New York: Rev. R. Davis & Brother.
- McGiffert, Arthur Cushman, ed. (1890), The Church History of Eusebius, A Select Library of the Nicene and Post-Nicene Fathers of the Christian Church, 2nd Series, Vol. I, New York: Christian Literature Co.
- Lake, Kirsopp; et al., eds. (1926–1942), The Ecclesiastical History, London: W. Heinemann.
- Louth, Andrew; et al., eds. (1965), The History of the Church from Christ to Constantine, London: Penguin.
- Deferrari, Roy Joseph, ed. (1969), Ecclesiastical History, Washington: Catholic University of America Press.
- Maier, Paul L., ed. (1999), The Church History: A New Translation with Commentary, Grand Rapids: Kregel Publications, reprinted 2007.

== See also ==
- Ecclesiastical history (Catholicism)
- Medieval ecclesiastic historiography

Other early church historians:

- Socrates Scholasticus
- Sozomen
- Theodoret of Cyrus
- Rufinus of Aquileia (he added two books to his translation of Eusebius)
- Philostorgius
- Evagrius Scholasticus
- Zacharias Rhetor
- Theodorus Lector
- John of Ephesus
- Bede, Historia ecclesiastica gentis Anglorum
- Flavius Josephus
- Saint Hegisuppus
- Justin Irenaeus
