= National Library of Russia, Codex Syriac 1 =

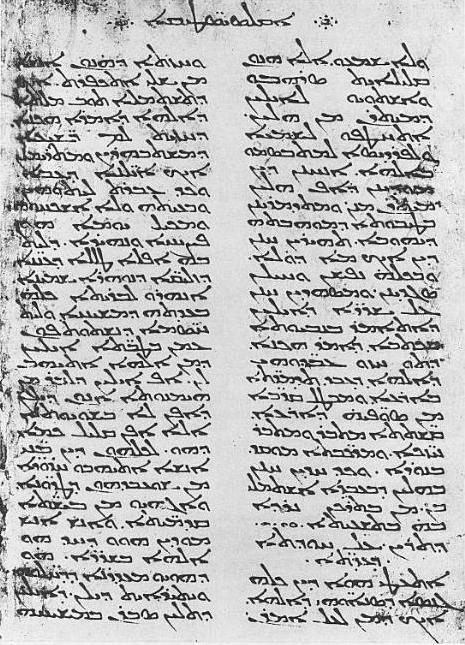
Ecclesiastical History, X,I,4-II,1

National Library of Russia, Codex Syriac 1, designated by siglum A, is a manuscript of Syriac version of the Eusebian Ecclesiastical History. It is dated by a Colophon to the year 462. The manuscript is lacunose.

== Description ==
The codex contains the text of the Ecclesiastical History, arranged in large quarto (4 leaves in quire), on 123 parchment leaves. The leaves measure is about 31 cm by 23.5 cm. The first leaf is a flyleaf taken from another volume. The original number of quires was 29. It has a large lacuna after folio 84 and several smaller defects elsewhere.

The writing is in two columns per page, in 29-34 lines per column, in fine, large, and bold estrangela letters, with a few diacritical points. The colour of ink is brownish black. The leaves were numbered by a later hand, but inaccurately. The text is divided into chapters.

It is one of the two extant ancient Syriac manuscripts of the Eusebian Ecclesiastical History. There are also some fragments in other manuscripts. Curiously the text of the later manuscript is better.

== History ==
According to the colophon, on folio 123 verso, the manuscript was written in the year 773 of the Seleucid era (462/1 A.D.) and the name of scribe was Isaac. The name of the place where the manuscript was written has been erased. According to the note on folio 1 recto the manuscript was presented to the convent of St. Mary Deipara by one Sahlun, a priest of Harran.

The manuscript was examined and described by William Wright and by William Hatch in 1934.

It is currently housed at the National Library of Russia (Cod. Syr. 1) in Saint Petersburg.

== See also ==
- British Library, Add. Ms. 12150
