= Meditation (Toshiko Akiyoshi Quartet album) =

Studio album by Toshiko Akiyoshi
- Released: 1971
- Recorded: 23, 26 February 1971
- Venue: Tokyo
- Genre: Jazz
- Length: 46:56
- Label: Dan Records

Toshiko Akiyoshi chronology
Jazz, The Personal Dimension (1971)	Meditation (1971)	Sumie / The Personal Aspect in Jazz (1971)

Alternative Cover
- re-issue cover with obi strip

Meditation (subtitle: Aspect of Toshiko Akiyoshi Quartet) is a jazz album by pianist Toshiko Akiyoshi and her quartet, recorded in Tokyo in late February 1971 and released in Japan by Dan Records.

== Track listing ==
Side 'A'

1. "What Now My Love" (Bécaud, Delanoë, Sigman) – 11:55
2. "Stella by Starlight" (Young, Washington) – 10:35

Side 'B'

1. "Willow Weep for Me" (Ronell) – 6:20
2. "Straight, No Chaser" (Monk) – 10:16
3. "Meditation" (Jobim, Mendonça) – 7:50

Same track order on re-issue except the positions of "Meditation" and "What Now My Love" are reversed.

== Personnel ==
- Toshiko Akiyoshi – piano
- Lew Tabackin – tenor saxophone, flute
- Lyn Christie – bass
- Albert Heath – drums

== References / External Links ==
- Minorufon VC-6001,
- Tokuma/Dan VC-7513
