= Life of Constantine =

4th century AD work by Eusebius

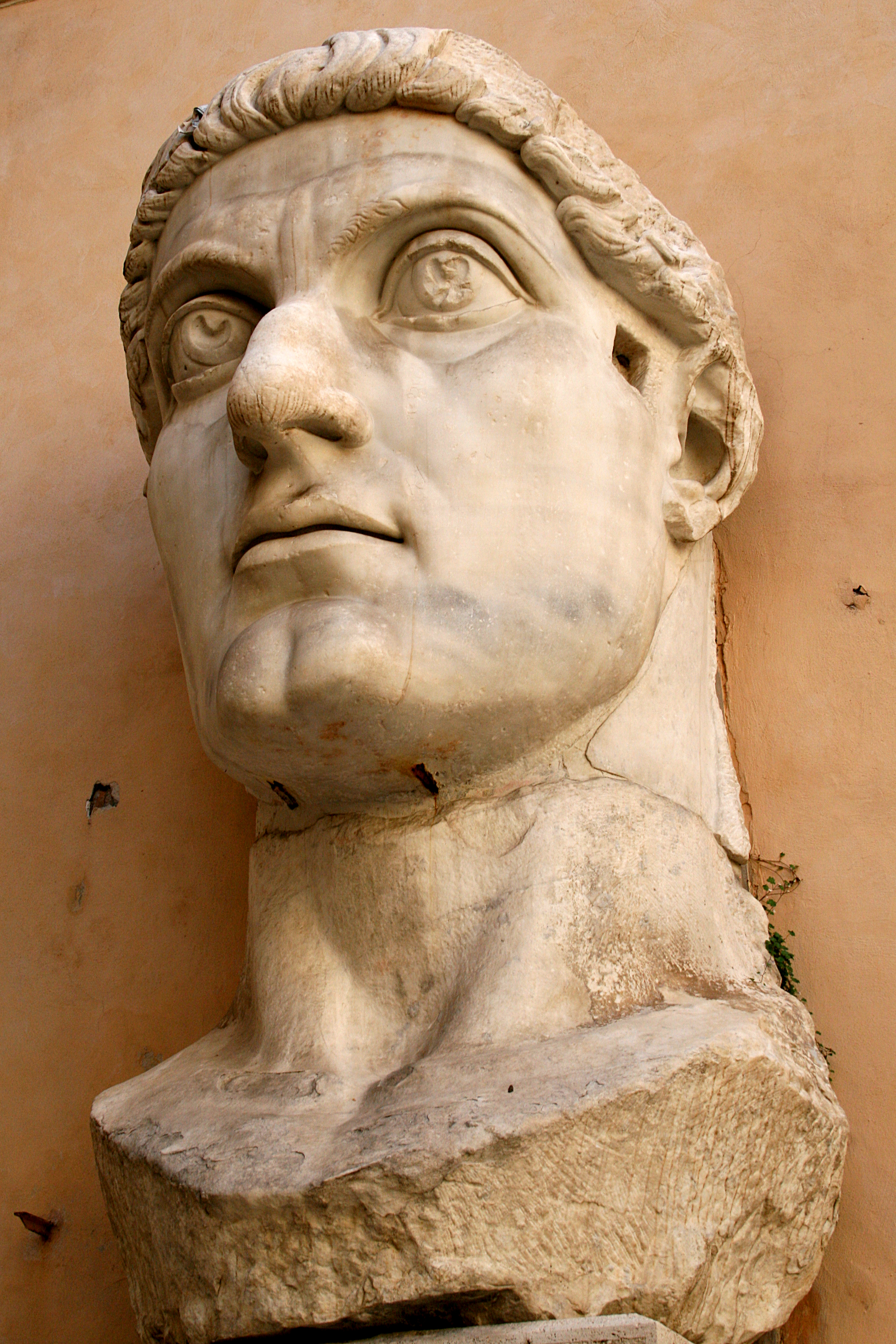
An image of Constantine, subject of Life of Constantine

Life of Constantine the Great (Ancient Greek: Βίος Μεγάλου Κωνσταντίνου, romanized: Bios Megalou Kōnstantinou; Latin: Vita Constantini) is a panegyric written in Greek in honor of Constantine the Great by Eusebius of Caesarea in the 4th century AD. It was never completed due to the death of Eusebius in 339. The work provides scholars with one of the most comprehensive sources for the religious policies of Constantine's reign. In addition to detailing the religious policies of the Roman Empire under Constantine, Eusebius uses Life of Constantine to engage several of his own religious concerns, such as apologetics, as well as a semi-bibliographic account of Constantine.

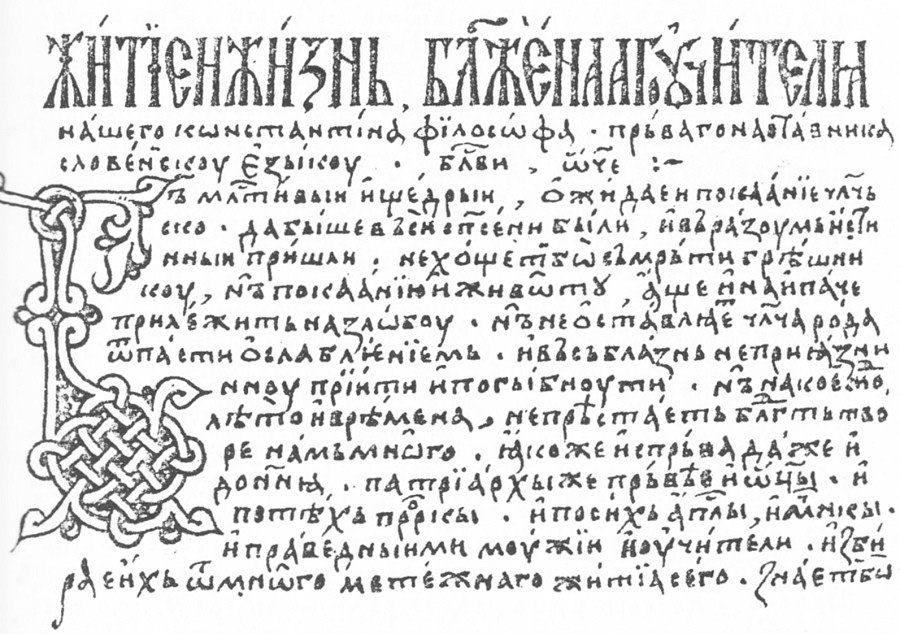
Facsmilie of a 15th-century Old Church Slavonic manuscript of the Life of Constantine

== Synopsis ==
Divided into four books, Life of Constantine begins with the declaration that Constantine is immortal. This opening sets the tone for the rest of the work, a general glorification and deification of the Emperor and his works on Earth. The work progresses into Constantine's time under the Emperor Diocletian. Constantine is contrasted with the tyrannical Diocletian, whose persecution of Christians and oppressive rule accentuates the presentation of Constantine as a strong Christian and a just man. This section also established the overarching metaphor in the work, as Eusebius likens Constantine to Moses. Eusebius suggests that it was God's will to raise Constantine to emperor, as a reliever of the Christian torment in the Empire.

Eusebius moves on from the introduction to Constantine's military exploits for the remainder of Book 1 and half of Book 2. The first of which, the campaign against Maxentius, contains perhaps the most famous scene in the Life of Constantine, the vision of Constantine. This section has generated ample controversy, as there is much suspicion regarding the validity of the story. Eusebius claimed that he heard the story from the mouth of Constantine himself; however, much of modern scholarship agrees that the story is a distortion of facts or completely fabricated. The same account is often compared to Lactantius’, which provides a radically different depiction of the same story. Eusebius moved on to describe Constantine's next military campaign, the war against Licinius. Eusebius facilitates in the blackening of Licinius, who was pro-Christian, that was started by Constantine as imperial propaganda to justify the aggression against Licinius.

The work transitions from military campaigns to the religious rule of Constantine. The rest of book 2 ends with the outlining of the religious problems faced by Constantine. Book 3 is largely concerned with Constantine's constructive settlement of the various religious problems. The section includes the only continuous contemporary account of the Council of Nicaea as well as the pilgrimage to Bordeaux. The Council of Nicaea has been examined closely by scholars for bias however, as Eusebius was himself very involved in the politics of the council. The remainder of the book deals with the ecclesiastical laws of Constantine. Eusebius focuses much of his attention in painting Constantine in an extremely Christian light, building holy sites and allegedly destroying pagan temples. The majority of Constantine's imperial letters appear in book 3.

Book 4 is largely concerned with Constantine and his personal life and final accomplishments, concluding with the death of Constantine. Most of the work is devoted to the illustration of Constantine's personal piety. His trip to Persia is painted in an apologetic universal Christian theme, his laws forbidding idol worship of his own image and the reiteration of the suppressing of idol worship and sacrifice. As the work concludes, Eusebius give much effort to uncover a personal Constantine, taking time to describe the Emperor as a remarkable public speaker and preacher, as well as a listener. Near the Emperor's death, Eusebius focuses on Constantine's mental and spiritual strength, as well as his physical strength, helping finish the portrait of a nearly godlike man. The panegyric ends with the death of the Emperor, his funeral, and the succession of the throne.

== Treatment of Constantine ==
Eusebius’ treatment of Constantine has generated much of the controversy surrounding the text. Eusebius’ use of the panegyric style results in an extremely generous treatment of Constantine that has been noted for its less-than-objective aims. Timothy Barnes notes that Eusebius clearly omits accounts and information to portray Constantine in the favorable light. Eusebius advanced the idea of divine right on Constantine, as he was Emperor due to God's will, and is God imitator on earth. Eusebius's narrative constructs Constantine as god-sent, in order to end the persecution of Christians under the Roman Empire, and ensure the correct worship of God. Eusebius’ vehicle for this narrative is metaphor, and he explicitly paints Constantine in the image of Moses.

== Sources ==
Eusebius's known sources for painting a textual portrait of Constantine and his rule come from eight legal texts, forty-six biblical references, and eight literary references. Eusebius often referenced his own former works, forty-one times in Life of Constantine, most notably Ecclesiastical History (Historia Ecclesiastica) and the Tricennalian Oration (Laus Constantini). The Ecclessiastical History itself has many imperial documents and letters from Constantine, some repeating their appearance in Life of Constantine. Eusebius often quotes verbatim both his own work and the imperial documents; however, he also quotes without citing, often to help build his narrative of Constantine as a god-sent emperor. These imperial letters, described or transcribed, frequently relate to religious matters concerning the treatment of pagans and Christians. They are thus an important source for Constantine's religious politics. The pronouncements in the letters are systematically pro-Christian and anti-pagan. They fit well into the Eusebius’ programmatic treatment of Constantine as a devout Christian emperor but are particularly vehement in their anti-paganism, given the historical context. The genuineness of the anti-pagan pronouncements, whether in content or in execution, has thus been a point of contention. Bradbury argues that the anti-pagan pronouncements were implemented but never applied, functioning as a moral guidance. Similarly, Curran argues that anti-pagan pronouncements were not actually put into practice, rather reflecting the emperor's personal stance. Regarding the pro-Christian imperial letters such as his letter to the Palestinians (Vita Constantini 2.24-44), various interpretations have been offered as well. While Barnes argues Constantine's letters were public proclamations of his faith within his broader pro-Christian program, Drake interprets the letters rather as documents in favour of religious toleration.

== The Letter to Shapur in Book IV ==
The ‘Letter of Constantine I to Shapur II’ is a diplomatic exchange located in Book 4 of the Life. It has been dated between 324 and 336. In the letter Constantine expresses to Shapur his devotion to Christianity, attributing his success to the Christian deity whose beneficence is the result of Constantine's piety, religious toleration and destruction of Tyrants and persecutors. He makes reference to previous emperors who fell from power due to their persecution of Christians, Valerian chief among them, who was himself defeated and captured by the Persians, an event which Constantine ascribes to the Christian deity. Aware of the presence of Christians within Shapurs realm, Constantine, writing on their behalf, calls upon the king to rule over them piously or, in a veiled warning, face the same downfall as other persecutors.

The Letters authenticity is source of debate for many Constantinian scholars. Barnes accepts the letter as genuine, its content in keeping with Constantine's' own view of his career, especially in the period of reform after the defeat of Licinius. Elizabeth Fowden argues for the letters authenticity, viewing its content as in keeping with Constantine's' vision of himself as an ambassador of God on earth and his desire for a universal Christian empire. Even so, the religious content of the letter and the claims by Constantine to represent the Christians of the Persian Empire continues to divide scholarly opinion.

The reliability and motives of Eusebius as a biographer must be considered when analysing the authenticity of the letter and its contents. The letter is distinctive in style from Eusebius’ own writing, and its content and tone is similar to that of the other Constantinian documents in the Life. The discovery of the ‘London Papyrus’, an independent imperial document which was found to be quoted honestly by Eusebius in the Life Book 2, was taken by many as a sign of his honesty in his use of imperial texts. Unlike the other letters quoted by him this one an extract, lacking the formal greeting found in other imperial documents quoted in the Vita and is the only one in which Constantine is dealing with secular affairs.

The letters location within the Life is peculiar. Barnes has argued for an adoption of an early date for the letter, around AD324/5, and fitting into Book 2 after the defeat of Licinius. Eusebius however has placed it in Book IV, after Constantine's wars against the Sarmatians and Goths on the Danube, thus moving its chronology to after AD335. Placing the letter after these events provides Eusebius with the opportunity to use the letter to foreshadow Constantine's final war against the Persians, which he claims Constantine said ‘he had still to achieve’. Such foreshadowing is a common motif of Book 4 and a further caution when assessing the authenticity and context of Constantine's correspondence with Shapur as presented by Eusebius.

== Credibility ==
Eusebius's apologetic glorification of Constantine has led scholars to question the credibility of his work: already in the 5th century AD, Christian historian Socrates Scholasticus wrote that Eusebius was "more intent on the rhetorical finish of his composition and the praises of the Emperor, than on an accurate statement of facts". Indeed, while many accept the work as generally reliable, few modern scholars claim that the text is not without its question marks, especially in regards to the motives and biases of Eusebius.

Eusebius consistently neglects relevant information to portray Constantine in a favorable light. He also engages in the politicization of several topics in the work, most notably the campaign against Licinius and the Council of Nicaea. In the former case, Eusebius engages in the tarnishing of Licinius’ reputation, painting him a supporter of pagans and a truce breaker, both claims that are historically dubious.

Eusebius was himself a participating member of the Council of Nicaea and his motivations in writing on the matter in which he was an active participant must be approached with caution. Eusebius also takes great pain in describing himself as very close to the Emperor, when in fact, the opposite is most likely. Timothy Barnes notes that Eusebius and Constantine meeting in person was a rare occurrence, as Eusebius did not reside near the capital, nor did he have special access to Constantine, as he claims in Life of Constantine. Rather, Barnes claims that before the Council of Nicaea, Eusebius might have seen the Emperor once, in a large crowd of people. It wasn't until 25 years later that Eusebius would meet the Emperor, at the Council of Nicaea. After the Council however, personal contact was sporadic at best. Even letter exchanges between the two were infrequent. It is clear that Eusebius was not the courtier he had painted himself as in Life of Constantine.

== Historical significance ==
Life of Constantine remains the most important work for examining the reign of Constantine. Only a select number of pagan accounts of the reign exist or have been discovered, with only one pagan panegyric known to exist. While Eusebius does have a clear pro-Christian bias, Life of Constantine also provides several insightful secular matters that have not been discovered outside of the work. However, despite its modern significance, Life of Constantine was widely obscure in the 4th and 5th centuries, and did not reach popularity until much later in history.

== General and cited references ==
- Barnes, Timothy (1981). Constantine and Eusebius. Cambridge, Mass.: Harvard University Press. ISBN 978-0-674-16530-4.
- Barnes, Timothy (1985). ‘Constantine and the Christians of Persia’:The Journal of Roman Studies, Vol. 75
- Bradbury, Scott (1994). ‘Constantine and the Problem of Anti-Pagan Legislation in the Fourth Century’, Classical Philology 89 120–139.
- Curran, John R. (2000). Pagan city and Christian capital : Rome in the fourth century, Oxford: Clarendon Press, ISBN 978-0-199-25420-0, retrieved 2019-12-2
- Drake, H. A. (2000). Constantine and the Bishops: The Politics of Intolerance, Baltimore: Johns Hopkins University Press, ISBN 978-0-801-87104-7, retrieved 2019-12-2
- Drake, H. A. (Jan. 1988). ‘What Eusebius Knew: The Genesis of the “Vita Constantinii”’, Classical Philology, Vol. 83, No. 1
- Eusebius (1999). Life of Constantine. Averil, Cameron; Stuart Hall, trans. Oxford: Clarendon Press. ISBN 978-0-19-814924-8.
- Fowden, Elizabeth Key (2006). "Constantine and the Peoples of the Eastern Frontier", in Lenski, N. The Cambridge Companion to the Age of Constantine, U.S.A. Cambridge University Press p. 389-90
- Fowden, Garth (1993). Empire to Commonwealth: Consequences of Monotheism in Late Antiquity. Princeton: Princeton University Press. ISBN 978-0-691-06989-0.
- Young, Frances; Teal, Andrew (1 June 2010). From Nicaea to Chalcedon: A Guide to the Literature and Its Background. Grand Rapids: Baker Publishing Group. ISBN 978-0-8010-3915-7.
