= Roman–Palmyrene War of 272–273 =

Roman conquest of Palmyra

Aurelian's invasion of Palmyra
- Part of the Crisis of the 3rd century
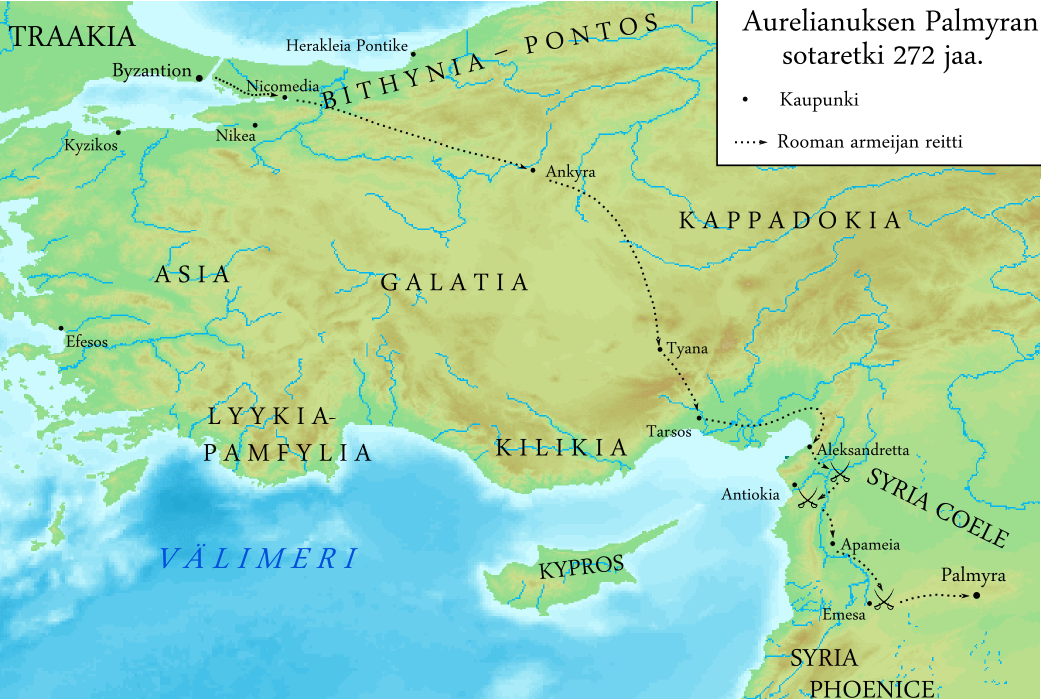
- Aurelian's campaigns into the Palmyrene Empire
Date	272–273 AD
Location	Palmyra and Anatolia
Result	Roman victory
Territorial changes	Fall of the Palmyrene Empire

Belligerents
Roman Empire	Palmyrene Empire

Commanders and leaders
Emperor Aurelian	Zenobia (POW); Zabdas (POW)

The Roman–Palmyrene War of 272–273, also called the Eastern campaigns of Aurelian or, more simply, the Palmyrene War, was fought between the Roman Emperor Aurelian against the Palmyrene Empire. These campaigns were the consequence of the secession of Palmyra desired by Zenobia after the Crisis of the Third Century, who had usurped her husband's title, effectively extending her power over all the eastern provinces of the Roman Empire, including Cilicia, Syria, Mesopotamia, Cappadocia, including an invasion of Egypt. The campaign ended with the Siege of Palmyra and with the capture of the Palmyrene queen, Zenobia. For his decisive triumph Aurelian was remembered not only as Palmyrenicus maximus, but also as Adiabenicus, Parthicus maximus, Persicus maximus, but above all as Restitutor orbis, as he had succeeded in reunifying the Empire by defeating both Palmyra and Gaul.

== Historical context ==
=== The Crisis ===
From 260 to 274, the Roman Empire suffered the secession of two vast territorial areas, which however allowed its survival. In the west, the usurpers of the Gallic Empire, such as Postumus (260–268), Laelian (268), Marcus Aurelius Marius (268–269), Victorinus (269–271), Domitian II (271) and Tetricus I (271–274), managed to defend the borders of the provinces of Britain, Gaul and Hispania. Eutropius wrote:

«As Gallienus abandoned the state, the Roman Empire was saved in the West by Postumus and in the East by Odenathus.» (translation from Latin)

— Eutropius, Breviarium ab urbe condita, 9, 11.

Postumus had in fact succeeded in establishing an empire in the West, located in Germania Inferior and Gallia Belgica and, shortly after, in all the other Gallic, British and Hispanic provinces including, for a short period, even Rhaetia.

The Roman Empire in 271 AD, and its rebel states, during the period of Military anarchy (260–274): The Gallic Empire; The Roman Empire; The Palmyrene Empire.

These emperors not only formed their own senate in the middle of the Treveri tribes and attributed the classical titles of consul, Pontifex maximus or tribune of the plebs to their magistrates in the name of Roma aeterna, but also assumed the normal imperial title, minting coins at the mint of Lugdunum, aspiring to unify with Rome and, most importantly, never think of marching against the so-called "legitimate" emperors, who rules over the main empire, such as Gallienus, Claudius Gothicus, Quintillus or Aurelian. They, on the contrary, felt they had to defend the Rhine borders and the Gallic coast from the attacks of the Germanic populations of Franks, Saxons and Alemanni. The Imperium Galliarum was therefore one of the three territorial areas that allowed Rome to retain its western part.

In the East, it was the Palmyrene Empire, also called the Kingdom of Palmyra, that rebelled and took over part of the provinces of Anatolia and Syria while invading Egypt, first with Odenathus (262–267), nicknamed by Gallienus as "Corrector Orienti ", and then by his secessionist widow, Zenobia (267–271). During the reign of Valerian, the prince of Palmyra, Septimius Odenathus, belonging to a family that had obtained Roman citizenship under Septimius Severus, after a failed attempt at an alliance with the Sassanid ruler of the Parthian kingdom, Shapur I, son of Ardashir I, had approached his own emperor, Valerian, who, in 258 had recognized him as vir consularis. The Roman Emperor had however been defeated in the Battle of Edessa of 260 AD, where he was taken prisoner by Shapur I. The intervention of Odenathus was providential for the fate of the Limes Orientalis, a series of fortifications along some eastern Roman provinces. The Palmyrene prince succeeded, in fact, in inflicting notable losses on the enemy, so much so that the emperor Gallienus conferred upon him numerous honorary titles, including that of Palmyrenicus and dux Romanorum.

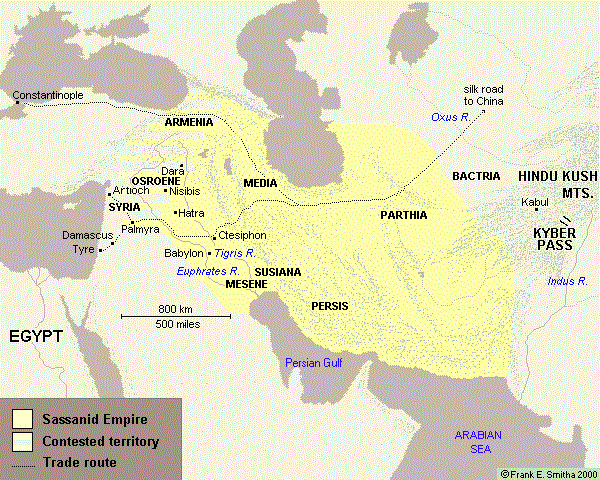
The Sasanian Empire at the time of Shapur I, ~260 AD.

The Sasanid campaigns of Odaenathus that succeeded later, however, led to the reconquest of the former Roman provinces of Mesopotamia and Cappadocia, while Odaenathus besieged Ctesiphon in 263 AD, sacking the city but without being able to conquer it. These victories earned Gallienus the honorary title of Persicus Maximus, and Odaenathus the one of Corrector Orientis, with jurisdiction over a large part of the Limes Orientalis. Later, Odaenathus was recognized with the title of king of kings, which placed him in opposition to the Shahanshah Shapur I. The borders of Odaenathus' power, in those years, extended north from the Taurus Mountains and to the south until it reached the Persian Gulf, including the provinces of Cilicia, Syria, Mesopotamia and Arabia Petraea.

=== Casus belli ===
Zenobia : Antoninianus
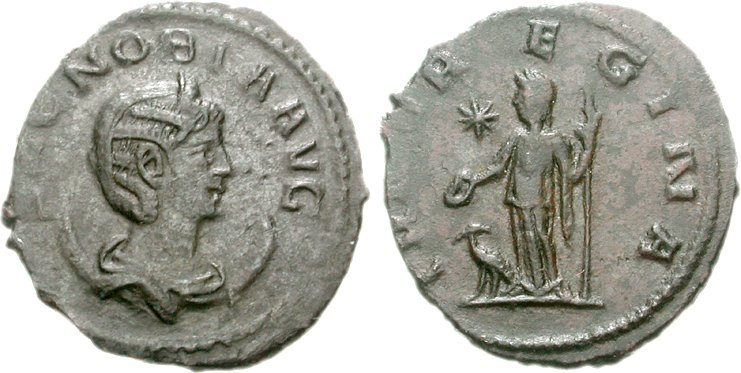
First side of the image: S ZЄNOBIA AVG, draped bust to the right, hair braided together in crescent;
Second side of the image: IVNO REGINA, Juno standing left, holding a patera in right hand and sceptre in left; at left foot, peacock standing left; star at upper left.
Minted in 272 in Antioch (3.64 g, 6h)

Between 267 and 268, Odaenathus was assassinated at Emesa, together with his son Hairan (or Herod or Herodianus). They were assassinated by Maeonius (or Maconius), cousin (Note: According to Zonaras xii.24.) or nephew (Note: According to Historia Augusta.) of Odaenathus, on the orders of Zenobia, queen consort of Odaenathus.

Maeonius was later executed immediately after the murder. Shortly after his death, Zenobia took power, in the name of her minor son, Vaballathus, with the aim of maintaining autonomy from Rome, thus creating an independent state in the East.

Gallienus, however, wanted to oust Zenobia, and march through the Limes Orientalis. He was stopped by two invasions: one from Barbarian tribes in 267 AD and another one by the Heruli tribe in 268 AD. The Vita Gallieni reports that the emperor sent against the Palmyrene Empire one of his generals, Aurelius Heraclianus, appointed dux of the expedition aimed at regaining control of the border with Persia after the death of Odenathus in 267. However, he was later defeated by Zenobia's Palmyrene knights, led by the general Septimus Zabdas.

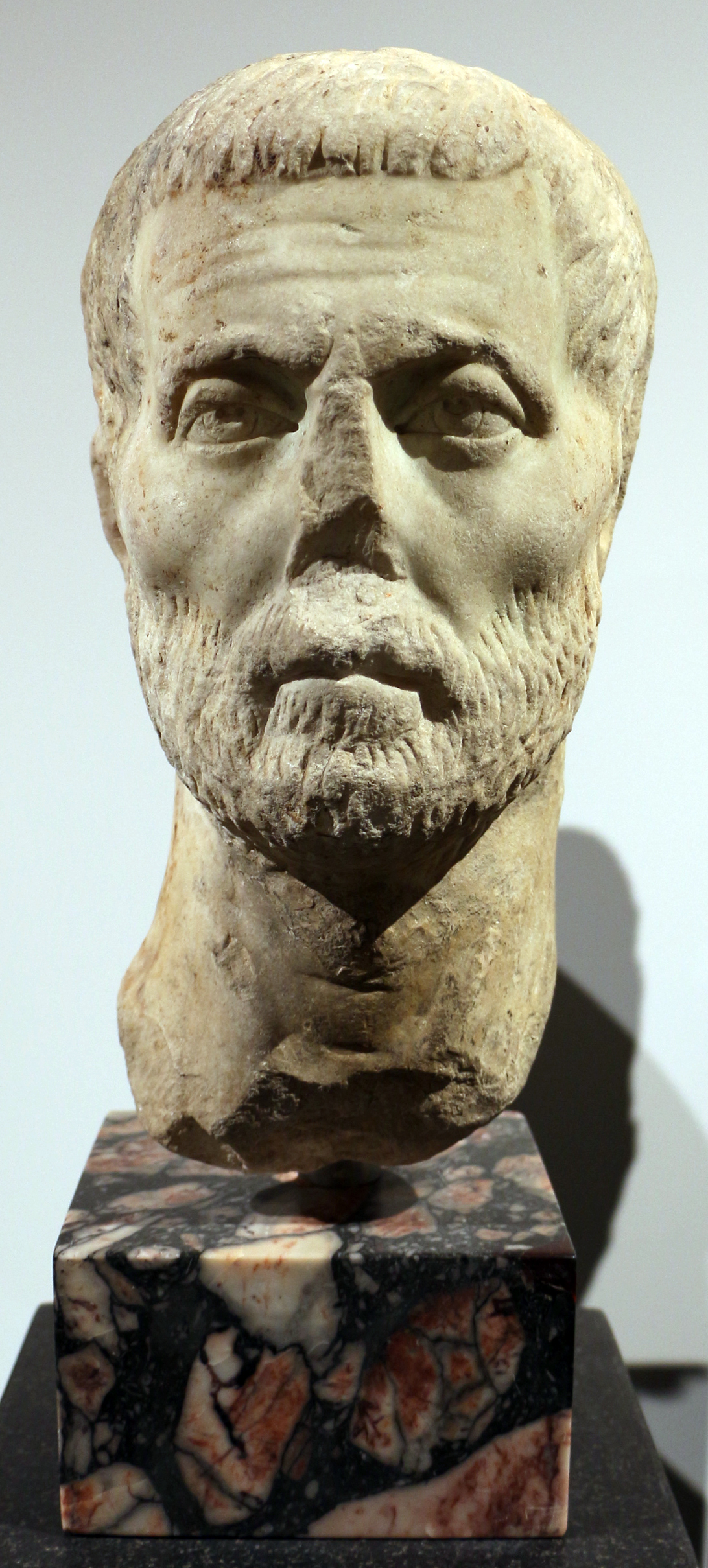
Portrait of Claudius Gothicus (Palatine Museum, Rome)

According to some alternative interpretations, this expedition did not take place under Gallienus but under his successor Claudius Gothicus or may not have taken place at all. However, in light of these events, the belief that the Palmyrenes had the mission of governing the East was strengthened and Zenobia, guardian-regent of her son Vaballathus, only after the death of the emperor, Claudius, which occurred in 270, led the rebellion against the imperial authority.

For the first few years Zenobia limited herself to preserving and strengthening the kingdom left to her by her husband, while maintaining temporary good relations with Rome. Then the queen began to establish ties with the Sassanid king Shapur I, who was in open hostility towards the Romans. Starting from 269, Zenobia implemented an expansionist policy, appointing the able general Septimius Zabdas as supreme commander of the Palmyrene troops, sending him to extend her power up to the borders of Bithynia and Egypt.

== Chronology of the campaign ==
=== 270 and 271: Aurelian's rise for power ===
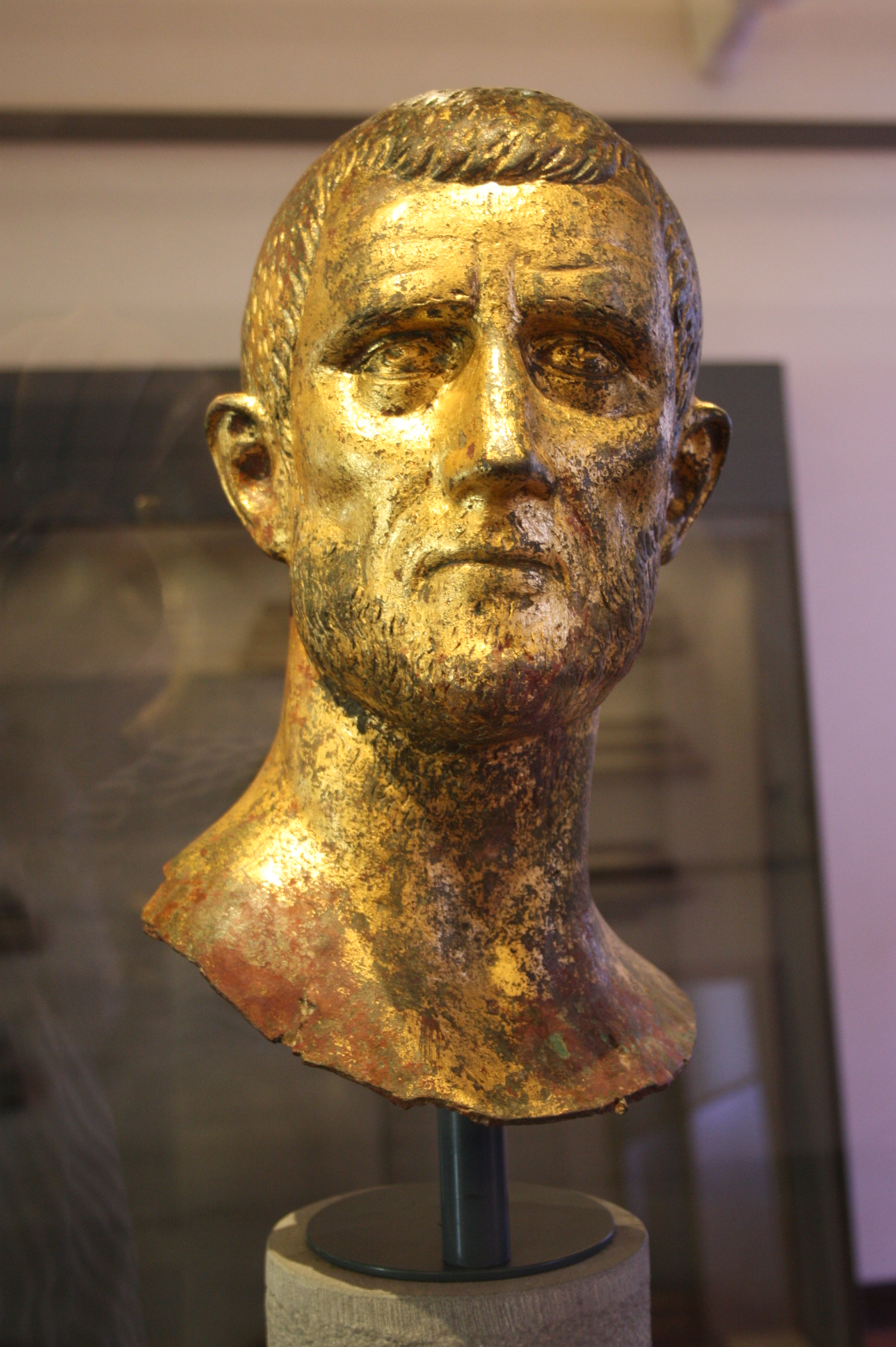
Bust of Aurelian.

When Emperor Claudius died, his brother Quintillus seized power with support of the Senate. With an act typical of the Crisis of the Third Century, the army refused to recognize the new emperor, preferring to support one of its own commanders: Aurelian was proclaimed emperor about August or September (older sources argue for May) by the legions in Sirmium. Aurelian then overthrew Quintillus, and was recognized as emperor by the Senate after Quintillus's death. The claim that Aurelian was chosen by Claudius on his death bed can be dismissed as propaganda; later, probably in 272, Aurelian put his own dies imperii at the day of Claudius' death, thus implicitly considering Quintillus a usurper. Aurelian, having solved the problems he had in Italy, decided to plug all the gaps in the Roman defensive system, restoring the integrity of the state on the old borders, starting with the Kingdom of Palmyra. As a first move, he sent the future emperor Marcus Aurelius Probus, when he was still a general, to Egypt to reconquer for the imperial cause the territories lost a couple of years earlier to the advantage of the Palmyrene kingdom. Probus succeeded in bringing the Egyptian territories back within the jurisdiction of the central Empire of Rome.

Aurelian : Antoninianus
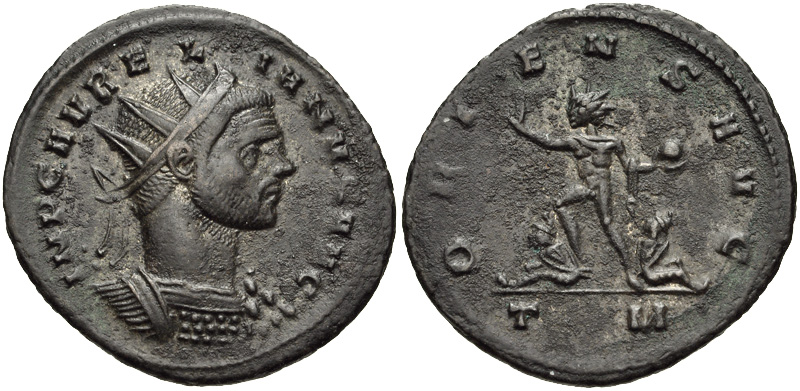
First side of the image: IMP C AVRE L IANVS AVG, radiate crown and bust with armour facing right;
Second side of the image: ORIENS AVG, the sol invictus striding left holding a globe and arm outstretched left, two enemies bound at his feet; TM in exergue.
minted in 274 in Mediolanum.
Aurelian: Antoninianus
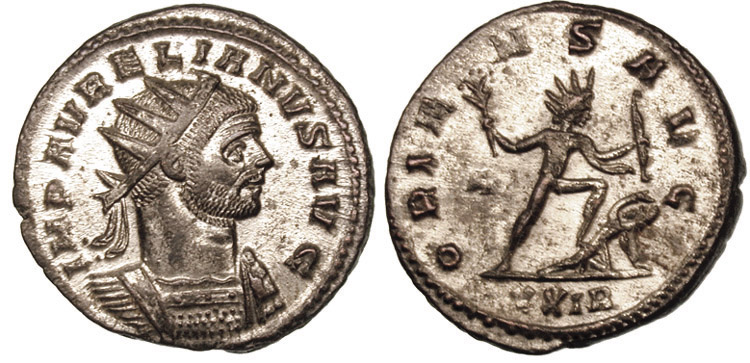
First side of the image: IMP AVRELIANVS AVG, radiate crown and bust with armour facing right;
Second side of the image: ORIENS AVG, the sol invictus walks right holding a bow on a branch, trampling an enemy; XXIR in exergue.
minted in 274–275 in Rome.
Aurelianus: Antoninianus
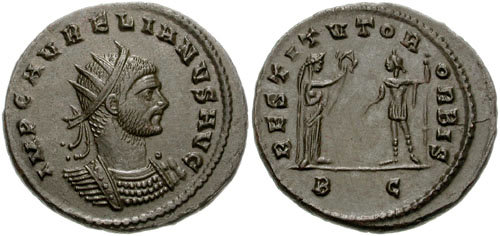
First side of the image: IMP C AVRELIANVS AVG, radiate crown and bust with armour facing right;
Second side of the image: RESTITVTOR ORBIS, a female figure standing right, giving a wreath to Aurelian, who stands left and holds a sceptre; BC in exergue.
minted in spring 273–274 in Cyzicus; (23mm, 4.25 g, 5h).

When Aurelian became emperor, he initially recognized Vaballathus with the titles of vir clarissimus rex and imperator dux Romanorum, so much so that in the kingdom of Palmyra coins were minted with the effigy of Vaballathus, imperator dux Romanorum on one side and of the emperor, Aurelian, on the other. Zenobia, instead, was initially granted the title of Augusta.

=== 272: Reconquest of Bythinia and Antioch ===
In 272, Aurelian crossed the Bosphorus and advanced quickly through Anatolia. With that, Aurelian brought the province of Bithynia under his control without encountering resistance, and took Ancyra (modern Ankara), and Tyana, the latter by treachery. Aurelian was merciful to the city of Tyana, sparing its inhabitants and executing the traitor who had opened its gates to him. Since Aurelian, during the siege, enraged by the resistance of the city, had sworn not to leave a dog alive in it after its capture, the Roman army asked the Emperor for permission to sack the city and exterminate the population. Aurelian replied:

«I did not swear this. Kill the dogs, I permit you.» (translation from Latin)

— Historia Augusta, Divus Aurelianus, 23.2.

Afterwards the army, disappointed by the spoils that had been lost, obeyed without hesitation. According to legend, Aurelian's clemency towards the inhabitants of Tyana was due to an apparition in a dream of the philosopher Apollonius who told him:

«Aureliano, if you want to win, spare my fellow citizens.» (translation from Latin)

— Historia Augusta, Divus Aurelianus, 24.4.

Zenobia, meanwhile, prepared a mighty army under the command of Zabdas, the one who had conquered Egypt on behalf of the kingdom of Palmyra; the Palmyrene soldiers were mostly light archers and iron-armed horsemen. The Roman and Palmyrene armies first clashed at Immae, in Syria (not far from Daphne, a suburb of Antioch on the Orontes). The Roman horsemen first fled, forcing the enemy horsemen into a tiring pursuit, then tired them out in small skirmishes and finally defeated the Palmyrene cavalry corps, certainly well armed but not very agile in their movements. After the defeat, Zabdas fled to Antioch and fearing not to be received he lied by saying that he had defeated the Romans and showed as proof a captive man in imperial robes who looked a little like Aurelian. Once inside, he told the truth to Zenobia and the following night he and the queen left with a second army for Emesa.

Aurelian arrived in Antioch the day after the battle, where he found the city almost deserted: in fact, most of the inhabitants, frightened by the arrival of the Roman army, had fled. Aurelian, realizing this, immediately took steps to repopulate the city by convincing the citizens who had fled to return with the promise that not a hair would be harmed, since they had been forced to obey the usurper out of necessity and not by will. Zenobia, leaving Antioch, had left an army on a hill overlooking the village of Daphne in order to keep Aurelian in Antioch as long as possible and to give her more time to reorganize and prepare an army capable of fighting on equal terms with that of Aurelian. These were however defeated by the Emperor, who, after leaving Antioch, subdued the cities of Apamea, Larissa and Arethusa, which spontaneously opened their gates to him. Having arrived at Emesa, he faced there the troops of Zenobia and her ally Zabdas, which amounted to 70,000 men. Despite the superiority of the Palmyrene cavalry, more numerous than the Roman one, Aurelian brought back a new victory over the usurper. Having entered Emesa, he ordered that a new temple be built, dedicated to the god sol invictus.

After these defeats, Zenobia found it impossible to prepare a third army and prepared to resist the siege of Palmyra that Aurelian would soon undertake. The Emperor meanwhile sent Probus to subjugate Egypt and headed towards Palmyra crossing the desert and facing the Syrian-Arab raiders, who during a small clash, managed to wound him. Aurelian then began the siege of Palmyra, uncertain of the protection of the Gods and of the outcome of the siege, he proposed to Zenobia the surrender promising the queen great honors if she surrendered and the citizens of Palmyra their ancient privileges. However Zenobia refused. The queen hoped that hunger would force the Romans to abandon the siege and that she would receive great help from the Persians. But the Sassanid king Shapur I had just died of illness and only small aid was sent from Persia which was however easily intercepted and defeated by the Roman legions. Convoys arrived regularly from Syria and soon Probus, fresh from the reconquest of Egypt, reached his emperor in Palmyra. Zenobia then decided to mount the fastest of her dromedaries and attempt to escape but sixty miles from Palmyra she was reached and captured by the Emperor just before she crossed the Euphrates. Shortly afterwards, Palmyra surrendered. The eastern provinces again recognized the authority of Aurelian. When the Emperor received the prisoner Zenobia, he asked her why she had dared to rebel against the Roman Emperors, and she replied:

«Because I disdained to regard an Aureolus, and a Gallienus as Roman Emperors. I recognize you alone as my conqueror and Sovereign.» (translation from Latin)

Zenobia, fearing for her life (the army had in fact asked for her to be executed), blamed her rebellion on her advisors, who with their advice had influenced her decisions, since she was a female (weaker sex) and therefore easily influenced. Cassius Longinus, Zenobia 's secretary, paid the price for it, guilty of having written the letter with which Zenobia had refused to surrender, and punished with death.

=== 273: end of the campaign ===
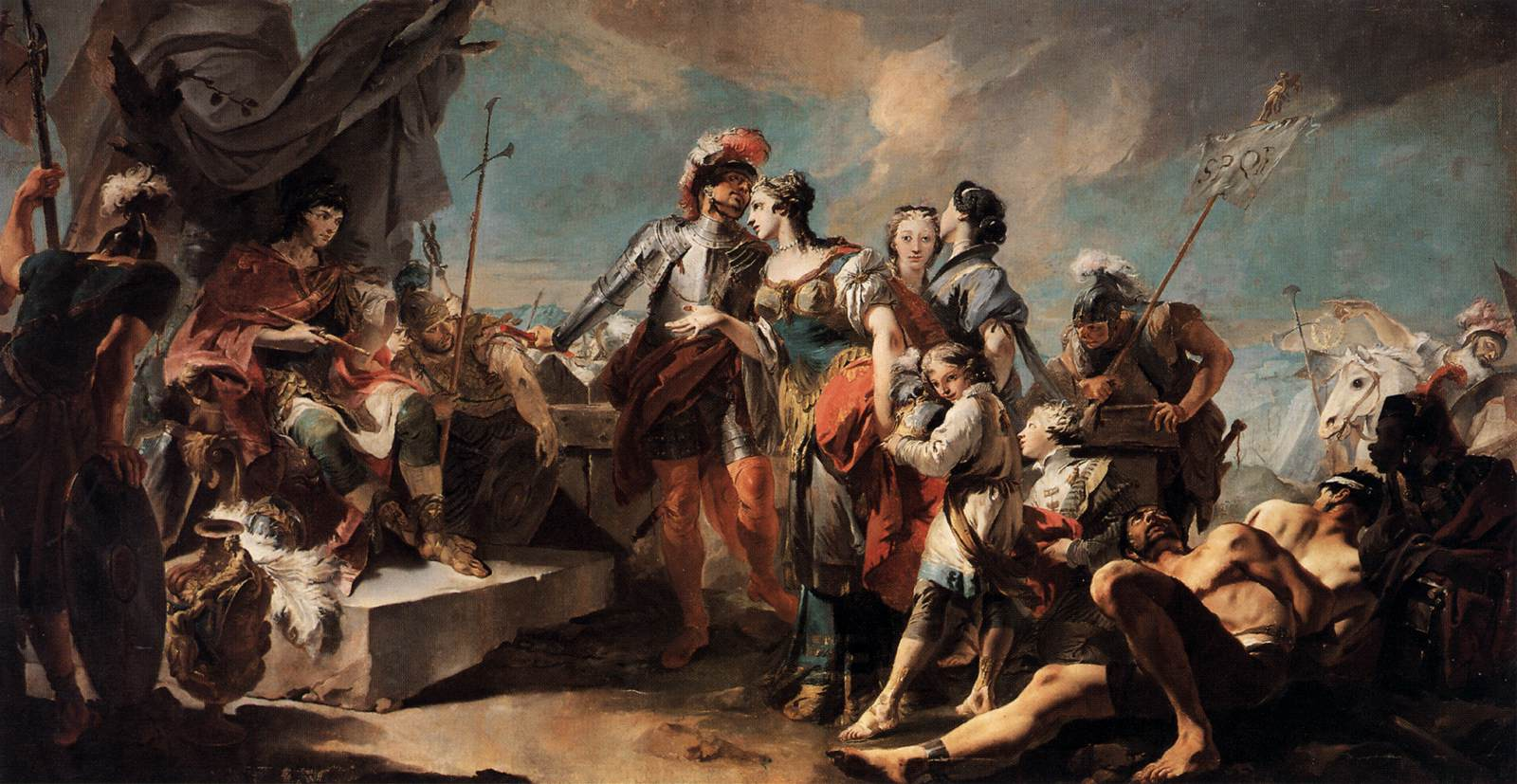
The surrender of Zenobia to Aurelian, from a painting by Giovanni Battista Tiepolo.

And while Aurelian was returning to the West, taking with him Zenobia and her son Vaballathus, he received news that the inhabitants of Palmyra, under the leadership of a certain Apseus, had revolted, had killed the local governor, and had ingratiated themselves with the praefectus Mesopotamiae and rector Orientis of Mesopotamia (a certain Marcellinus), so that he himself would assume the imperial throne, in opposition to Aurelian. And since Marcellinus existed, they decided to proclaim as emperor a relative of Zenobia, a certain Achileus (or Antiochus). Without delay Aurelian returned to quell the rebellion. Once he had restored order without fighting, he was harsh with the city of Palmyra: not only did he order the execution of the armed rebels but also of women, old people, children and farmers. The city was then destroyed, while Achilleus/Antiochus was left free, not even considering him worthy of punishment, so irrelevant was he. He did however allow the surviving inhabitants to rebuild and inhabit the city.

After this campaign Palmyra declined from a trading post to an obscure city with few inhabitants. In the meantime, Fermus, a friend of Odaenathus and Zenobia and a merchant by profession, organized a revolt in Egypt. Having occupied Alexandria, he proclaimed himself Augustus and minted coins, published edicts and organized an army. However, he was quickly defeated by Aurelian and put to death. Once all these revolts had been quelled and the East pacified, Aurelian was able to return triumphant to Rome.

== Consequences ==
Aurelian returned triumphantly to Rome in 274. The triumphal procession was opened by twenty elephants, four royal tigers and more than 200 exotic animals, followed by approximately 1,600 gladiators. The procession included numerous prisoners of war from various nations (Goths, Vandals, Roxolani, Sarmatians, Alans, Franks, Suebi, Germans) and Egyptians: ten female warriors of Gothic nationality were attributed a fictitious Amazon nationality. The most important prisoners were, however, Zenobia, former Queen of Palmyra, and Tetricus, ex Emperor of Gaul, dressed in sumptuous attire. The chariot of Aurelian was drawn by four deer or four elephants. The procession was finally closed by the senators, the people and the army. At the end of the procession, numerous games were celebrated in the theatres, in the Circus Maximus, in the Flavian amphitheatre as well as a naumachia.

The Emperor was very generous with the two usurpers. He gave Zenobia a villa near Tivoli, where she became a Roman matron and her daughters married Romans of illustrious rank. Tetricus built a palace on the Monte Caelio, where Aurelian was once invited to dinner. The Emperor conferred on Tetricus the title of governor of Lucania while the son of the usurper of Gaul became an influential senator.

== Sources ==
=== Primary or ancient sources ===
- Eutropius, Breviarium ab Urbe condita, IX.
- Historia Augusta, Gallieni duo, Divus Aurelianus and Tyranni triginta.
- Zosimus, Historia nova, I.

=== Secondary or modern sources ===
- Bryce, Trevor (March 2014). Ancient Syria: A Three Thousand Year History. Oxford: OUP. ISBN 978-0-19-964667-8.
- Frye, R. N. (1993). "The Political History of Iran under the Sassanians". In Bayne Fisher, William; Gershevitch, Ilya; Yarshater, Ehsan; Frye, R. N.; Boyle, J. A.; Jackson, Peter; Lockhart, Laurence; Avery, Peter; Hambly, Gavin; Melville, Charles (eds.). The Cambridge History of Iran. Cambridge: Cambridge University Press. ISBN 0-521-20092-X.
- Kienast, D. (2017). Römische Kaisertabelle. Grundzüge einer römischen Kaiserchronologie. Darmstadt: Wissenschaftliche Buchgesellschaft. ISBN 9783534132898.
- Mazzarino, Santo (1978). L'impero romano. Bari: Editori Laterza. ISBN 88-420-2377-9.
- Peachin, Michael (1990). Roman Imperial Titulature and Chronology, A.D. 235–284. Amsterdam: Gieben. ISBN 90-5063-034-0.
- Southern, Pat (2001). "Beyond the Eastern Frontiers". The Roman Empire from Severus to Constantine. Routledge. ISBN 0-415-23943-5.
- Stein, Arthur (1924). "Zur Chronologie der römischen Kaiser von Decius bis Diocletian". Archiv für Papyrusforschung und verwandte Gebiete. 7 (1–2). doi:10.1515/apf.1924.7.1-2.30. S2CID 161464046.
- Watson, Alaric (2004). Aurelian and the Third Century. London & New York: Routledge. ISBN 0-415-30187-4.
