= Vaballathus =

Emperor of Palmyra in 272

Vaballathus 𐡥𐡤𐡡𐡠𐡫𐡶 وهب اللات
- Augustus of Syria, Cappadocia and Aegyptus
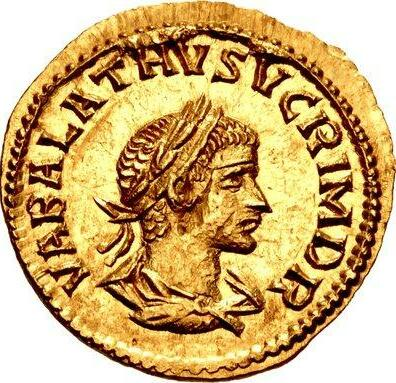
- Vaballathus as King on the obverse of a Aureus minted in Antioch, 271 AD. Legend: vabalathvs v c r im d r.

King of Kings of Palmyra
- Reign: 267–272 AD
- Predecessor: Odaenathus and Hairan I
- Regent: Zenobia

Emperor of Palmyra
- Reign: 272
- Successor: Septimius Antiochus (from 273 AD)
- Co-ruler: Zenobia
- Born: Septimius Vaballathus c. 259; Palmyra, Syria
- Died: After 274; Rome, Roman Empire
Regnal name
- Imperator Caesar Lucius Julius Aurelius Septimius Vaballathus Athenodorus Augustus
- House: House of Odaenathus
- Father: Odaenathus
- Mother: Zenobia
- Religion: Palmyrene paganism

Septimius Vaballathus (Palmyrene Aramaic: 𐡥𐡤𐡡𐡠𐡫𐡶, romanized: Wahbʾalat; Arabic: وهب اللات, romanized: Wahb Allāt, lit. 'Gift of Allāt'; c. 259 – c. 274 AD) was emperor of the Palmyrene Empire centred at Palmyra in the region of Syria.

He came to power as a child under his regent mother Zenobia, who led a revolt against the Roman Empire and formed the independent Palmyrene Empire.

== Early life ==
Lucius Julius Aurelius Septimius Vaballathus was born and raised in the city of Palmyra, an oasis settlement in the Syrian Desert in 259 to the king of kings of Palmyra, Odaenathus, and his second wife, the queen consort of Palmyra, Zenobia.

Vaballathus is the Latinized form of his Palmyrene name, Wahballāt, "Gift of Allāt". As the Arabian goddess Allāt came to be identified with Athena, he used Athenodorus as the Greek form of his name. He had a half-brother, Hairan I, born from his father and another woman, who reigned as co-king of kings with his father, and a lesser-known brother, Hairan II. He also might have had other brothers, who were mentioned in (and only known from) the Historia Augusta, Herennianus and Timolaus. Herennianus may be Hairan; while Timolaus is probably a fabrication.

== As king ==
=== Succession to the throne ===
In 267, a relative, perhaps a cousin of his father named Maeonius, murdered Odaenathus and his half-brother Hairan I. The unreliable Historia Augusta lists Maeonius as one of the "Thirty Tyrants" that claimed imperial power during Gallienus' reign. However, this is most likely an invention; according to the chronicler Joannes Zonaras, Maeonius was executed immediately after the murder. With Odaenathus and his oldest son dead, the succession came to his younger son, Vaballathus. The young Vaballathus was made king (rex clarissimus imperator dux Romanorum, "illustrious King of Kings" and corrector totius orientis) of the Palmyrene Empire at eight years old. Being too young to rule, his mother Zenobia ruled as queen regent and was the de facto ruler of Palmyra.

=== Reign ===
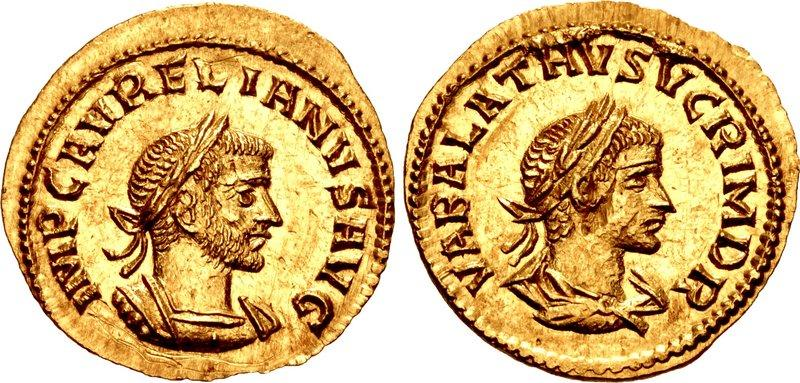
Coinage bearing Aurelian's and Vaballathus portraits.

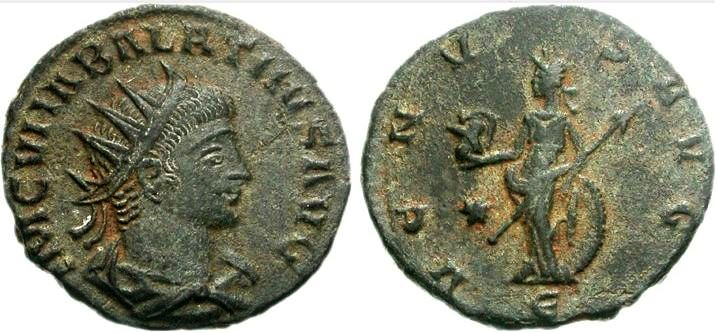
Antoninianus Wahb-Allat as Augustus

Initially the Roman emperor Aurelian recognized Vaballathus' rule, perhaps because Aurelian was engaged in a major conflict with the Gallic Empire in the west and hesitated to incite open warfare with the Palmyrene Empire. This mutual recognition is testified by early coins issued by Zenobia under Vaballathus's name and acknowledging Aurelian as emperor. In the coins, Aurelian is shown wearing a radiate crown that signifies his supremacy as emperor, while Vaballathus is crowned with a laurel wreath. The Alexandrian minted coins showed Aurelian in his first year and Vaballathus in his fourth year with Vaballathus adopting honorary titles possibly inherited from his father Odaenathus. Although the Palmyrene Empire was centred in Palmyra, Vaballathus and Zenobia probably spent most of their reign in Antioch, Syria's administrative capital. The relationship between the Roman Empire and the newly established Palmyrene empire deteriorated, and a series of Palmyrene conquests, carried out under the protective show of subordination to Rome, began around 270.

In October of 270, a Palmyrene army of 70,000 invaded Roman Egypt, and declared Zenobia, Vaballathus's mother, the Queen of Egypt. The Roman general Tenagino Probus was able to regain Alexandria in November, but was defeated and escaped to the fortress of Babylon, where he was besieged and killed by Zabdas, a Palmyrene general, who continued his march south and secured Egypt. Afterward, in 271, Septimius Zabbai, another Palmyrene general serving Zenobia, started military operations in Anatolia, and was joined by Zabdas in the spring of that year. The Palmyrenes subdued the Asian province of Galatia, and occupied the regional capital of Ancyra, marking the greatest extent of the Palmyrene expansion.

Aurelian disappeared from Palmyrene coinage, while Zenobia and Vaballathus adopted the titles of Augusta and Augustus, respectively. Vaballathus was named in coins "King, Emperor, Dux Romanum leader of the Romans" and an open rebellion against Rome started.

== Defeat ==
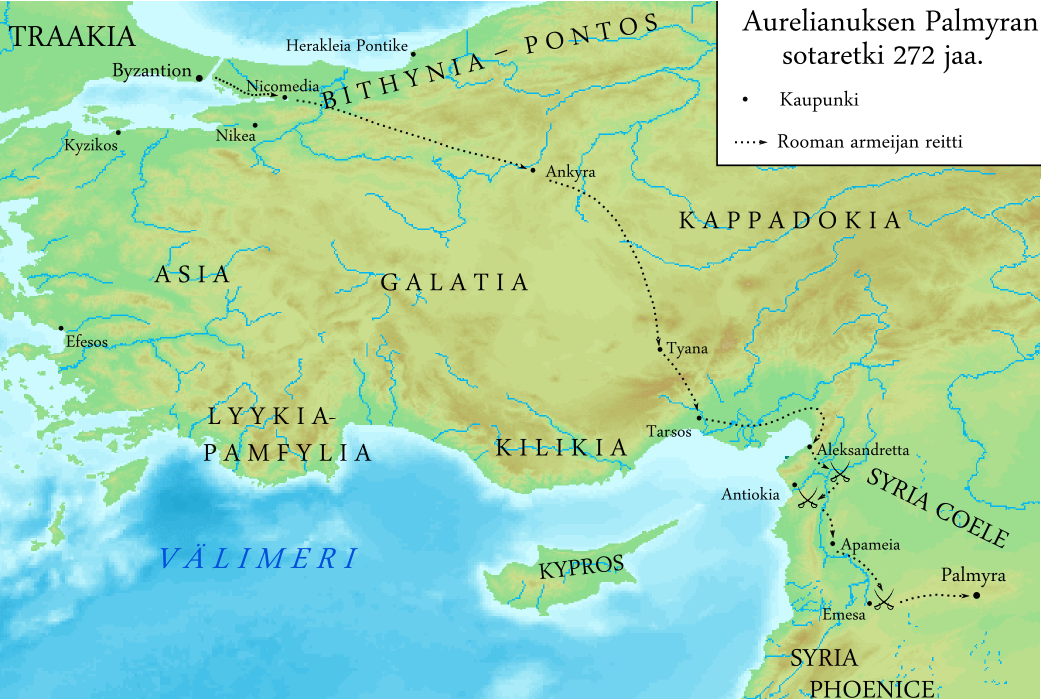
The route of Aurelian's campaign against Palmyra.

In 272, Emperor Aurelian crossed the Bosporus and advanced quickly through Anatolia. While the Roman general Marcus Aurelius Probus regained Egypt from Palmyra, the emperor continued his march and reached Tyana. Tyana fell and was lost to Palmyrene control; Aurelian up to that point had destroyed every city that resisted him, but he allegedly spared Tyana. Whatever the reason for his clemency, it paid off, as many more cities submitted to him upon seeing that the emperor would not exact revenge upon them.

Passing through Issus, Aurelian defeated Zenobia in the Battle of Immae near Antioch. The Palmyrene armies retreated to Antioch, then later Emesa, while Aurelian advanced and took the former. The defeat at Emesa by the Romans forced the Palmyrene armies to evacuate to the capital. The Romans began a siege of Palmyra, and tried to breach the city defences several times but were repelled, however, the situation worsened, so Zenobia, Vaballathus's mother, left the city and headed east to ask the Sasanian Empire for help. The Romans followed the queen, arrested her near the Euphrates, and brought her back to the emperor. Soon after, the Palmyrene citizens asked for peace, and the city was surrendered.

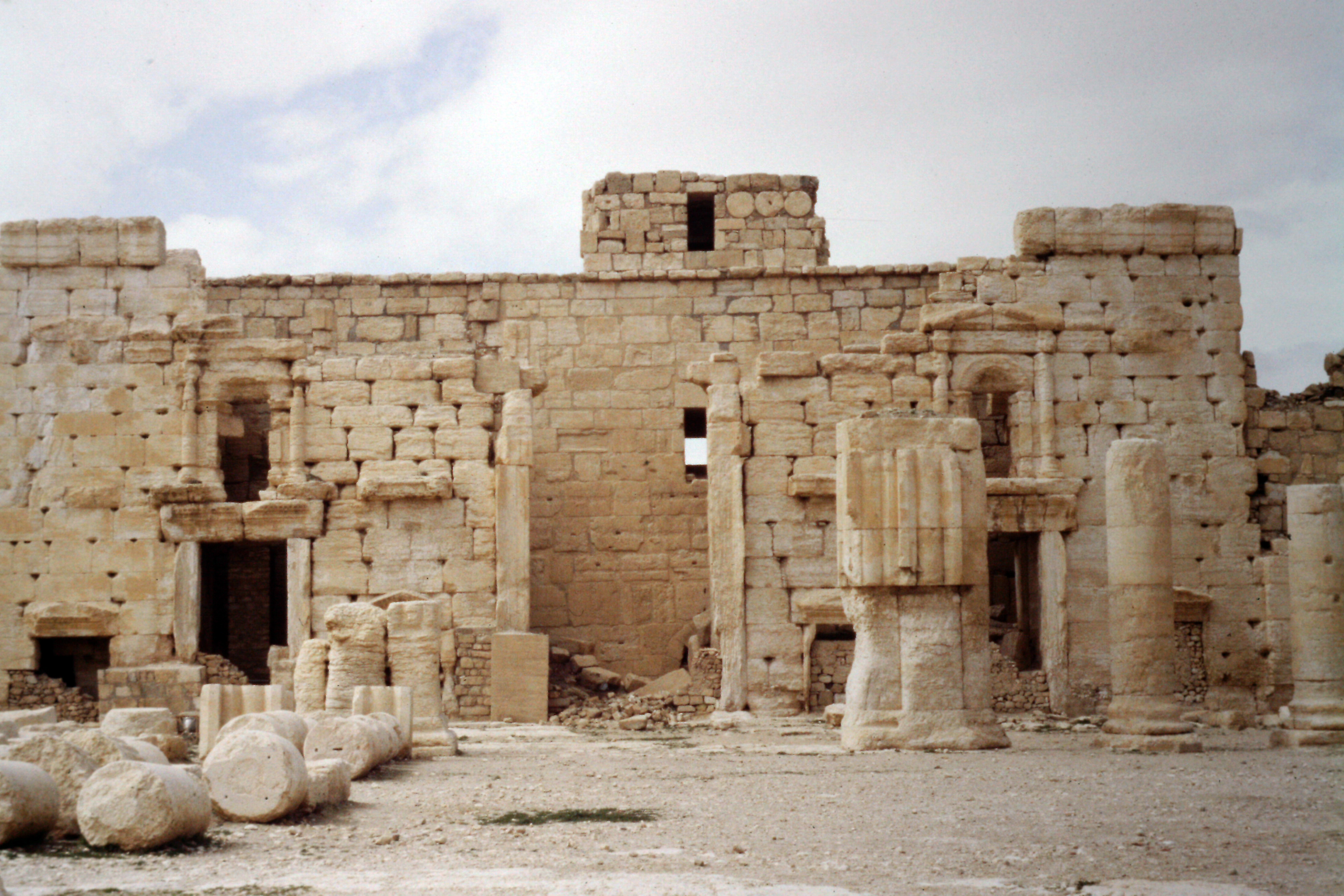
The Temple of Bel was looted and sacked by the Romans during the razing of Palmyra

The end of Vaballathus's nominal rule came after losing the siege of Palmyra. Vaballathus, his mother and her council were taken to Emesa and put on trial. Most of the high-ranking Palmyrene officials were executed, while Zenobia and Vaballathus's fates remain uncertain. Although Aurelian had most of his prisoners executed, he most likely spared the queen and her son to parade them in his planned triumph.

According to Zosimus, Vaballathus died on the way to Rome, but this theory has been neither confirmed nor disproved. Other sources have implied that after shipping the defeated Zenobia and Vaballathus to Rome, Aurelian allowed both of the rebels to live, but only after they had been marched through the streets of the imperial city in accordance with Roman traditions of celebrating military victories with a triumphal procession. This theory is supported by Aurelian's similar treatment of the Tetrici, Tetricus I and Tetricus II of the Gallic Empire, long-time enemies of Rome whom the emperor allowed to retire following their defeat at the Battle of Châlons in 274.

The fate of Palmyra, however took a turn for the worse. In 273, a revolution was started by Septimius Apsaios who declared a relative of Zenobia, Septimius Antiochus, as Augustus. Aurelian marched to Palmyra, razing it. Buildings were smashed, citizens clubbed and massacred and Palmyra's holiest temples pillaged. The city was reduced and disappeared from historical records from that time, thus ending the ascendancy of Palmyra over Roman Asia Minor.

== Bibliography ==
- Ando, Clifford (2012-06-20). Imperial Rome AD 193 to 284: The Critical Century. Edinburgh University Press. ISBN 978-0-7486-2920-6.
- Ball, Warwick (2002-01-04). Rome in the East: The Transformation of an Empire. Routledge. ISBN 978-1-134-82386-4.
- Bryce, Trevor (2014). Ancient Syria: A Three Thousand Year History. Oxford University Press. ISBN 978-0-19-100293-9.
- Butcher, Kevin (2003). Roman Syria and the Near East. Getty Publications. ISBN 978-0-89236-715-3.
- Teixidor, Javier (2005). "Palmyra in the Third Century". In Cussini, Eleonora (ed.). A Journey to Palmyra: Collected Essays to Remember Delbert R. Hillers. Brill. pp. 181–225. ISBN 978-90-04-12418-9.
- Nakamura, Byron (1993-06-08). "Palmyra and the Roman East". Greek, Roman, and Byzantine Studies. 34 (2): 133–150. ISSN 2159-3159.
- Pollard, Nigel (2000). Soldiers, Cities, and Civilians in Roman Syria. University of Michigan Press. ISBN 978-0-472-11155-8.
- Smith II, Andrew M. (2013). Roman Palmyra: Identity, Community, and State Formation. Oxford University Press. ISBN 978-0-19-986110-1.
- Sommer, Michael (2017). Palmyra: A History. Taylor & Francis. ISBN 978-1-351-34715-0.
- Southern, Pat (2008). Empress Zenobia: Palmyra's Rebel Queen. Bloomsbury Publishing. ISBN 978-1-4411-7351-5.
- Southern, Pat (2015). The Roman Empire from Severus to Constantine (2nd ed.). Routledge. ISBN 978-0-415-73807-1 – via Internet Archive.
- Stoneman, Richard (1994). Palmyra and Its Empire: Zenobia's Revolt Against Rome. University of Michigan Press. ISBN 978-0-472-08315-2.
- Watson, Alaric (1999). Aurelian and the Third Century (PDF). The Classical World. Vol. 94. London: Routledge. pp. 284–286. doi:10.2307/4352566. ISBN 0-415-07248-4. JSTOR 4352566. S2CID 153920517. Archived from the original (PDF) on 2020-02-18.
