= 272 =

272 in various calendars
- Gregorian calendar: 272; CCLXXII
- Ab urbe condita: 1025
- Assyrian calendar: 5022
- Balinese saka calendar: 193–194
- Bengali calendar: −322 – −321
- Berber calendar: 1222
- Buddhist calendar: 816
- Burmese calendar: −366
- Byzantine calendar: 5780–5781
- Chinese calendar: 辛卯年 (Metal Rabbit); 2969 or 2762 — to — 壬辰年 (Water Dragon); 2970 or 2763
- Coptic calendar: −12 – −11
- Discordian calendar: 1438
- Ethiopian calendar: 264–265
- Hebrew calendar: 4032–4033
- Hindu calendars
- Vikram Samvat: 328–329
- Shaka Samvat: 193–194
- Kali Yuga: 3372–3373
- Holocene calendar: 10272
- Iranian calendar: 350 BP – 349 BP
- Islamic calendar: 361 BH – 360 BH
- Javanese calendar: 151–152
- Julian calendar: 272; CCLXXII
- Korean calendar: 2605
- Minguo calendar: 1640 before ROC 民前1640年
- Nanakshahi calendar: −1196
- Seleucid era: 583/584 AG
- Thai solar calendar: 814–815
- Tibetan calendar: ལྕགས་མོ་ཡོས་ལོ་ (female Iron-Hare); 398 or 17 or −755 — to — ཆུ་ཕོ་འབྲུག་ལོ་ (male Water-Dragon); 399 or 18 or −754

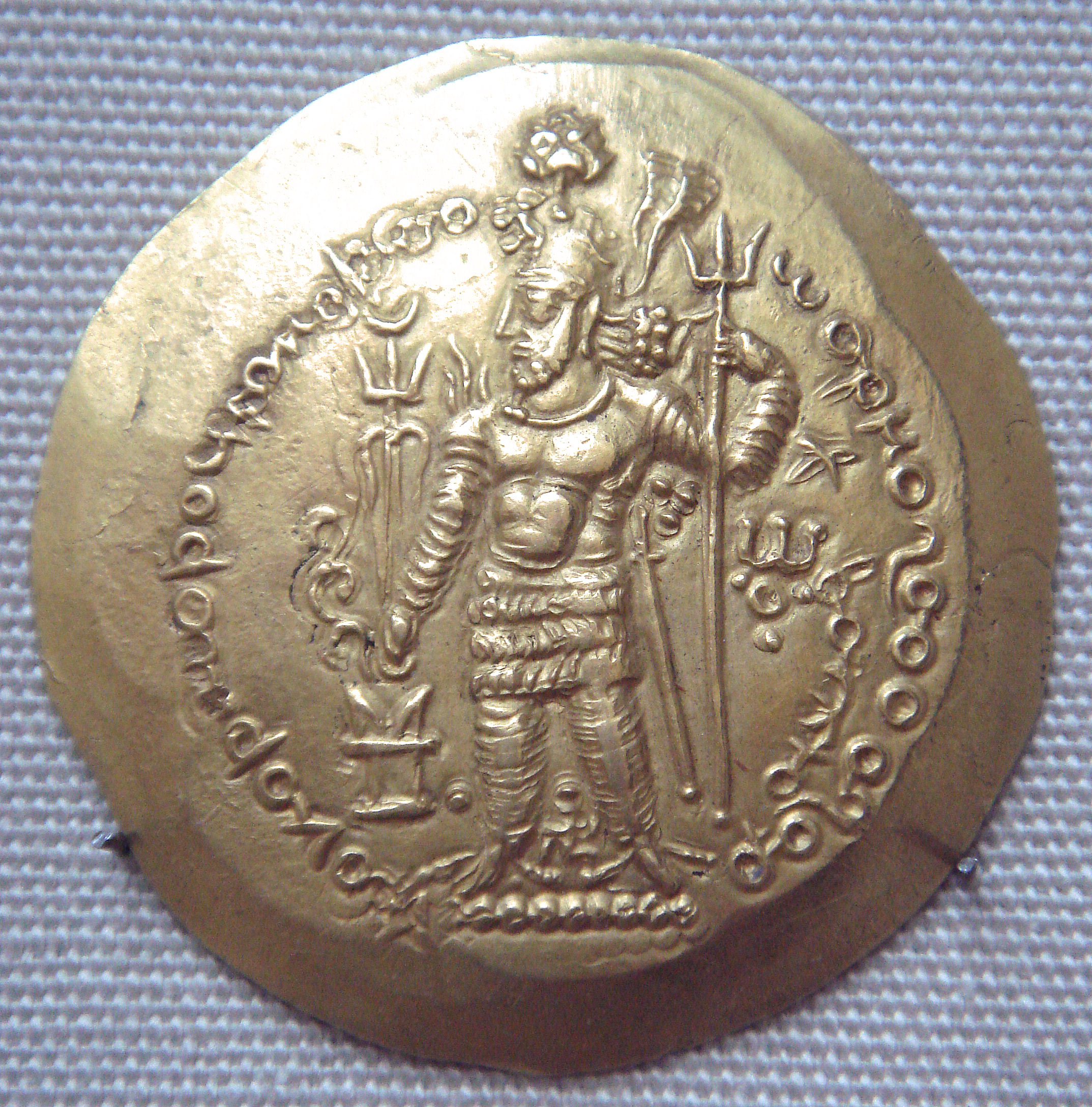
King Hormizd I of Persia

Year 272 (CCLXXII) was a leap year starting on Monday of the Julian calendar. At the time, it was known as the Year of the Consulship of Postumius and Veldumnianus (or, less frequently, year 1025 Ab urbe condita). The denomination 272 for this year has been used since the early medieval period, when the Anno Domini calendar era became the prevalent method in Europe for naming years.

== Events ==
=== By place ===
==== Roman Empire ====
- Emperor Aurelian launches a two-pronged invasion of the Palmyrene Empire, sending his commander Marcus Aurelius Probus to restore Roman rule in Egypt while he marches into Asia Minor.
- As part of a strategy of clemency, Aurelian spares Tyana after capturing the city. This strategy encourages units under Zenobia to defect to Aurelian.
- Battle of Immae: Aurelian defeats the Palmyrene heavy cavalry (clibanarii) near Antioch. Queen Zenobia flees under cover of darkness to Emesa (Syria).
- Aurelian supports the bishops of Italy in deposing the bishop of Antioch, Paul of Samosata, who had been a supporter of Zenobia. This is the first recorded instance of an imperial intervention in an ecclesiastical dispute.
- Battle of Emesa: Aurelian decisively defeats the Palmyrene army.
- Aurelian besieges Palmyra. Zenobia attempts to escape to Persia but is captured on the Euphrates. Palmyra surrenders soon after.
- Following a series of trials held in Emesa, Cassius Longinus and other advisors of Zenobia are executed for conspiring against Aurelian.

=== By topic ===
==== Religion ====
- Dometius succeeds Titus as Patriarch of Constantinople.
- Saint Denis, first Bishop of Paris, and two of his disciples are beheaded on the road to the Temple of Mercury that stands atop a hill outside of the city. The hill will later be called Montmartre (Mountain of Martyrs) in Lutetia (modern Paris).
- Paul of Samosata is deposed as Patriarch of Antioch.

== Births ==
- February 27 – Constantine the Great, Roman emperor (d. 337)
- Wei Shuo (or Mouyi), Chinese calligrapher (d. 349)

== Deaths ==
- Shapur I (the Great), king of the Sassanid Empire
- Sabbas Stratelates, Roman general and martyr
- Sima Fu, Chinese prince and statesman (b. 180)
- Wan Yu, Chinese chancellor and politician
