= Palmyrene invasion of Egypt =

Conflict between the Roman and Palmyrene Empires (270)

- Part of the Crisis of the Third Century
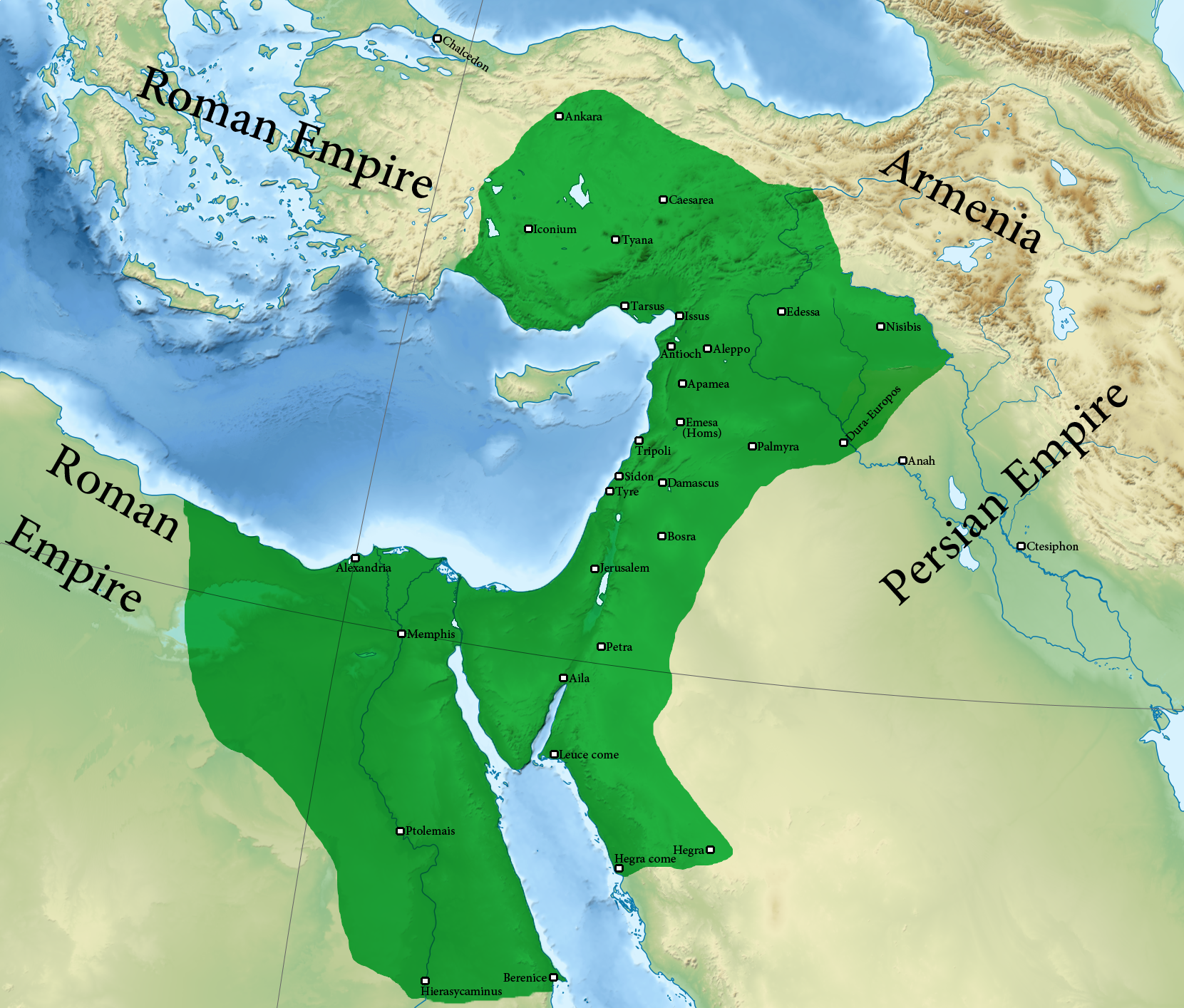
- A map of the short-lived Palmyrene Empire at its zenith shortly after the invasion of Egypt
Date	October 270 AD
Location	Roman Egypt
Result	Palmyrene victory
Territorial changes	The Roman Empire loses Egypt; Palmyrene annexation of Upper and Lower Egypt

Belligerents
Roman Empire	Palmyra Support: Blemmyes

Commanders and leaders
Tenagino Probus †	Zabdas; Zenobia; Timagenes

Strength
50,000	70,000

Casualties and losses
Heavy	Unknown

The forces of Queen Zenobia of Palmyra, led by her general Zabdas and aided by an Egyptian general named Timagenes, invaded and subsequently annexed Egypt, which was under control of the Roman Empire at the time, in 270 AD.

The invasion of Egypt is sometimes explained by Zenobia's desire to secure an alternative trade route to the Euphrates, which was cut because of the war with the Sasanian Empire, although the Euphrates route was only partially disrupted. Zenobia's personal ambition and political motivation to establish Palmyrene dominance over the east definitely played a part in her decision to invade Egypt.

The invasion coincided with, or probably even caused, serious unrest in Egypt, whose people were split between supporting and defying the approaching Palmyrene army. What also made the situation worse for the Romans was that the prefect of Egypt, Tenagino Probus, was at the time preoccupied with naval expeditions against pirates.

The Palmyrenes entered Alexandria, and left a garrison of 5,000, although shortly after, Probus was alerted to the situation in Egypt and quickly returned there. He recaptured Alexandria, but his success was short-lived when the Palmyrene army regained control of the city. Probus retreated to the Babylon Fortress. However, Timagenes, a native of Egypt with knowledge of the land, ambushed the Roman rear and captured the fortress. Tenagino Probus then committed suicide and the Palmyrenes consolidated their dominion over Egypt.

== Background ==
In 269, while Claudius Gothicus, the successor of Emperor Gallienus, was preoccupied with defending the borders of the empire against Germanic invasions, Zenobia took the chance to consolidate her power and authority over the east. Roman officials in the East were caught between loyalty to the emperor and Zenobia's increasing demands for allegiance.

The reason the queen resorted to using military force to strengthen her authority in the East is unclear, but the refusal of Roman officials to recognize Palmyrene authority has been suggested. Zenobia's expeditions were intended to maintain Palmyrene dominance. Another factor may have been the weakness of Roman central authority and its corresponding inability to protect the provinces, which harmed Palmyrene trade and probably convinced Zenobia that the only way to maintain stability and prosperity in the Roman East was direct Palmyrene control over the region. Also, Bostra and Egypt received trade which would have otherwise passed through Palmyra, while the Tanukhids near Bostra and the merchants of Alexandria probably attempted to rid themselves of Palmyrene domination, all of which triggered military action from the queen.

Zenobia had already subjugated Syria, Judea and Arabia Petraea by early 270, sacking the capital of the last and pacifying the Tanukhid tribes in Hauran who challenged her authority. These actions made it clear that Egypt was going to be the queen's next target.

== Invasion ==
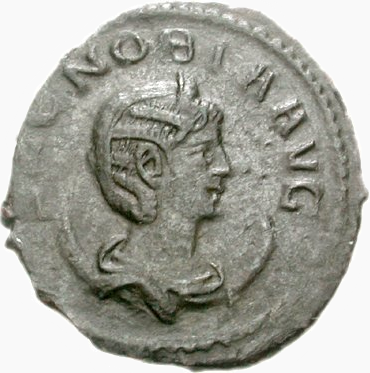
Queen Zenobia of Palmyra

The exact date of the invasion is disputed. Zosimus placed it after the Battle of Naissus and before the death of emperor Claudius, which sets it in the summer of 270. Other historians such as Watson have dismissed Zosimus' account and place the invasion in October 270. According to Watson, the invasion of Egypt was an opportunistic move by the queen, encouraged by the news of Claudius' death in August.

The arrival of Palmyrene military on Egypt's eastern frontier coincided with, and perhaps even caused, unrest in Egypt, whose society was fractured between supporters and opponents among the divided population.

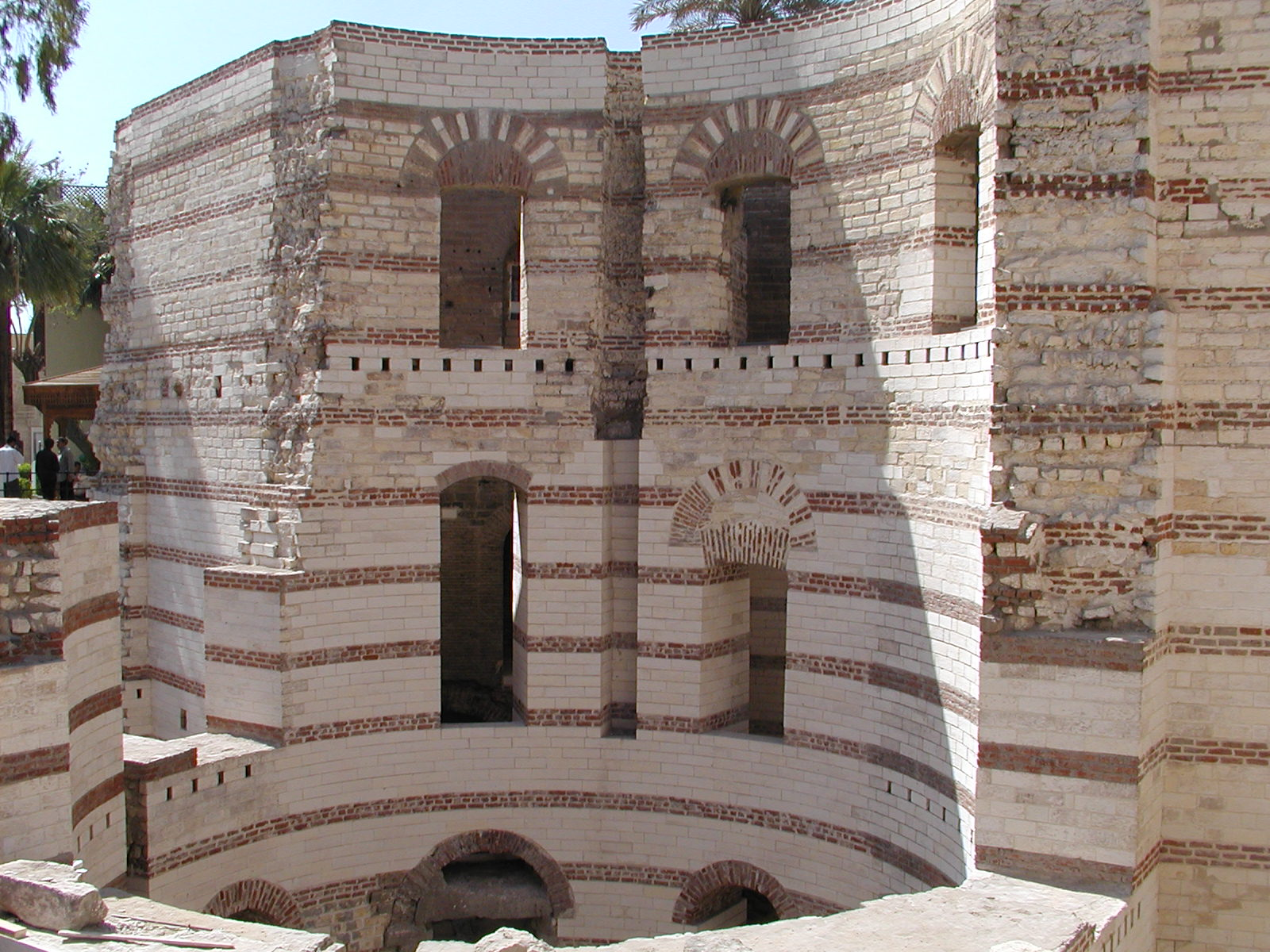
The Babylon Fortress, where Probus retreated

Aside from local Egyptian support, what made matters worse for the Romans was the absence of Egypt's prefect, Tenagino Probus, who was preoccupied with naval expeditions against pirates, who were most likely Goths who were raiding the Levant coast at the time. Zosimus states that the Palmyrenes were helped by an Egyptian general named Timagenes during the invasion, and states that Zabdas moved into Egypt with 70,000 soldiers, defeating an army of 50,000 Romans. After their victory, the Palmyrenes withdrew their main force and left a 5,000-soldier garrison.

By early November, Tenagino Probus had been alerted about the events. He quickly returned, assembled an army, expelled the Palmyrenes and regained Alexandria, only for Zabdas to promptly return to Egypt. Zabdas quickly regained Alexandria, where Zenobia and the Palmyrenes seemed to have had local support, and Probus fled south. The last battle was at the Babylon Fortress, where Tenagino Probus took refuge. Although the Romans had the upper hand, Timagenes, with his knowledge of the land, ambushed the Roman rear, capturing the fortress. Tenagino Probus then committed suicide.

It is stated in the Augustan History that the Blemmyes were among Zenobia's allies, and Gary K. Young cites the Blemmyes attack and occupation of Coptos in 268 as evidence of a Palmyrene-Blemmyes alliance.

== Aftermath ==
The Palmyrenes subsequently annexed and tightened their grip on Egypt, declaring Zenobia Queen of Egypt.

=== Roman reaction ===
The stance of the Roman Empire towards Palmyrene authority in Egypt and the east in general is debated. Aurelian's acceptance of Palmyrene rule in Egypt may be inferred from the Oxyrhynchus papyri, which are dated by the regnal years of the emperor and Vaballathus. Although it was extremely unlikely that Aurelian would have accepted such power-sharing, he was unable to act due to crises in the west. It has been suggested that his apparent condoning of Zenobia's actions may have been a ruse to give the queen a false sense of security to buy time for him to prepare for war.

In any case, it appears that Aurelian's apparent tolerance was to secure and ensure the continuation of the supply of Egyptian grain to Rome, as it is not recorded that the supply was cut after the invasion, and grain reached Rome in 270 as usual.

=== Invasion of Asia Minor ===
The invasion was later followed by an invasion of Asia Minor led by Zabdas and Zabbai. The invasion was successful, marking the greatest extent of Palmyrene dominance over the eastern Mediterranean region of what was the Roman Empire once they reached Ancyra. The invasion paved the road for Zenobia's imperial claims and her subsequent breakaway and the independence of the short-lived Palmyrene Empire.

=== Reconquest by Rome ===
In May 272, Aurelian's expedition against the Palmyrenes reached Egypt, and by early June Alexandria was recaptured by the Romans, followed by the rest of Egypt by the third week of June. Zenobia seems to have withdrawn the bulk of the Palmyrene army from Egypt to focus on Syria, which, if lost, would have meant the end of Palmyra as a significant power in the region.

== See also ==
- Sack of Bostra
- Tenagino Probus
