= Siege of Tyana (272) =

Conflict between Palmyrene and Roman forces (272)

- Part of the Palmyrene War
- Siege of Tyana (272) (Turkey)
Date	AD 272
Location	Tyana, Anatolia
Result	Roman victory

Belligerents
Roman Empire	Palmyrene Empire

Commanders and leaders
Emperor Aurelian	Unknown

The siege of Tyana occurred in 272 AD. The forces of the Roman Emperor Aurelian were seeking to conquer the Palmyrene Empire.

== Background ==
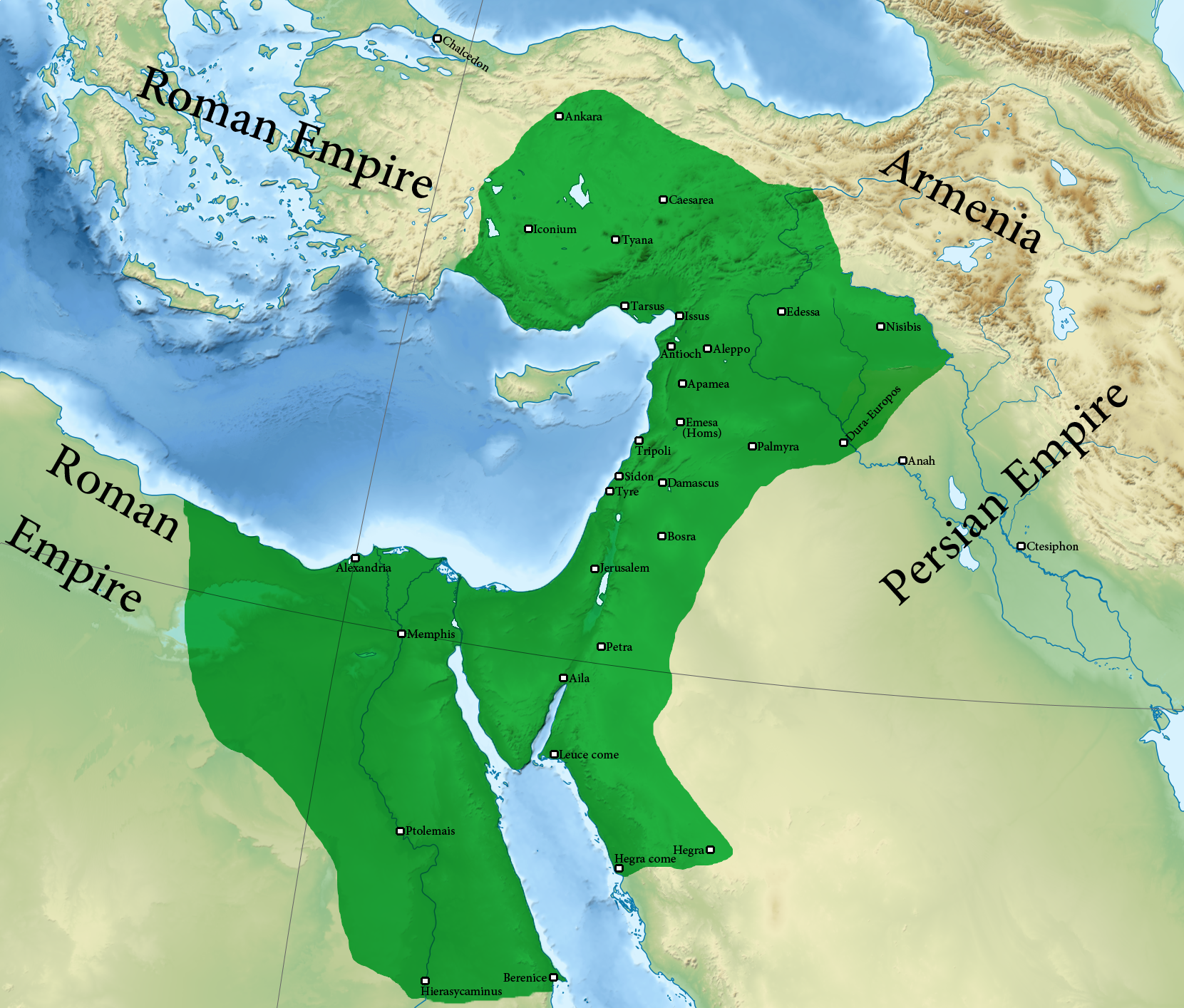
Palmyra at its zenith in 271

In 269, while Claudius Gothicus (Gallienus's successor) was defending the borders of Italy and the Balkans against Germanic invasions, Palmyrene Queen Zenobia was cementing her authority; Roman officials in the East were caught between loyalty to the emperor and Zenobia's increasing demands for allegiance. The timing and rationale of the queen's decision to use military force to strengthen her authority in the East is unclear; scholar Gary K. Young suggested that Roman officials refused to recognize Palmyrene authority, and Zenobia's expeditions were intended to maintain Palmyrene dominance. Another factor may have been the weakness of Roman central authority and its corresponding inability to protect the provinces, which probably convinced Zenobia that the only way to maintain stability in the East was to control the region directly.

The historian Jacques Schwartz tied Zenobia's actions to her desire to protect Palmyra's economic interests, which were threatened by Rome's failure to protect the provinces. Also, according to Schwartz, the economic interests conflicted; Bostra and Egypt received trade which would have otherwise passed through Palmyra. The Tanukhids near Bostra and the merchants of Alexandria probably attempted to rid themselves of Palmyrene domination, triggering a military response from Zenobia.

In October of 270, a Palmyrene army of 70,000 invaded Egypt, and declared Zenobia, Vaballathus's mother, the Queen of Egypt. The Roman general Tenagino Probus was able to regain Alexandria in November, but was defeated and escaped to the fortress of Babylon, where he was besieged and killed by Zabdas, a Palmyrene general, who continued his march south and secured Egypt. Afterward, in 271, Zabbai, another Palmyrene general serving Zenobia, started the operations in Anatolia, and was joined by Zabdas in the spring of that year. The Palmyrenes subdued the Asian province of Galatia, and occupied the regional capital of Ancyra, marking the greatest extent of the Palmyrene expansion.

== Siege ==
=== Aurelian's vision ===
As Aurelian besieged the city of Tyana, he allegedly had a vision of the great 1st-century philosopher Apollonius of Tyana, whom he respected greatly, in a dream. Apollonius implored him to show Tyana mercy if he took the city. Aurelian did so. This paid off militarily for the remainder of his campaign as many more cities submitted to him upon seeing that the Emperor would not exact revenge upon them.

Apollonius was seen as the champion to the Greek people, as he was seen as a miracle worker. Having been a wise philosopher he was well known by many during and after his lifetime. Some texts relate him to, or mention him being very similar to, Jesus of Nazareth. He was highly respected, and he was even regarded as a magician to some people who believed that he practiced wizardry. This may be the reason as to why Aurelian was allegedly guided by a vision to be merciful for a greater reward in the future.

Another source tells the story differently. Supposedly Aurelian lost patience and gave orders that when the city finally fell nothing and no one, not even a dog, was to be left alive. In the end the city fell to him by treachery and he contented himself with having the traitor put to death, sparing the other human and canine inhabitants.

=== Resistance ===
Most of the soldiers of Tyana only offered little resistance, and the resistance that they did offer up against the legions was completely ineffective. Some men of the garrison charged at Aurelian's men without weapons in their hands as they were farmers that had been called to action, and were not prepared for any sort of warfare with the Roman Empire. Following this minor skirmish, the garrison soon surrendered to the legions, allowing them to enter the newly captured city.

== Aftermath ==
Tyana was a great victory, which was accomplished with very little effort by the Romans. Prior to the siege, Aurelian had destroyed every city that resisted him, but he spared Tyana. Whatever the reason for his clemency, Aurelian sparing of Tyana paid off: many more cities submitted to him upon seeing that the emperor would not exact revenge upon them.

The gains made by his legions allowed Aurelian to take back from the Palmyrenes significant amounts of territory swiftly and then defeat Empress Zenobia along with subsequently diminishing and weakening the rest of the Palmyrene Empire in just six months. The war against the Palmyrene Empire only lasted for three years in total with Aurelian rising to power in 270.
