= Sack of Bostra =

Conflict between the Roman and Palmyrene empires (270)

- Part of the Crisis of the Third Century
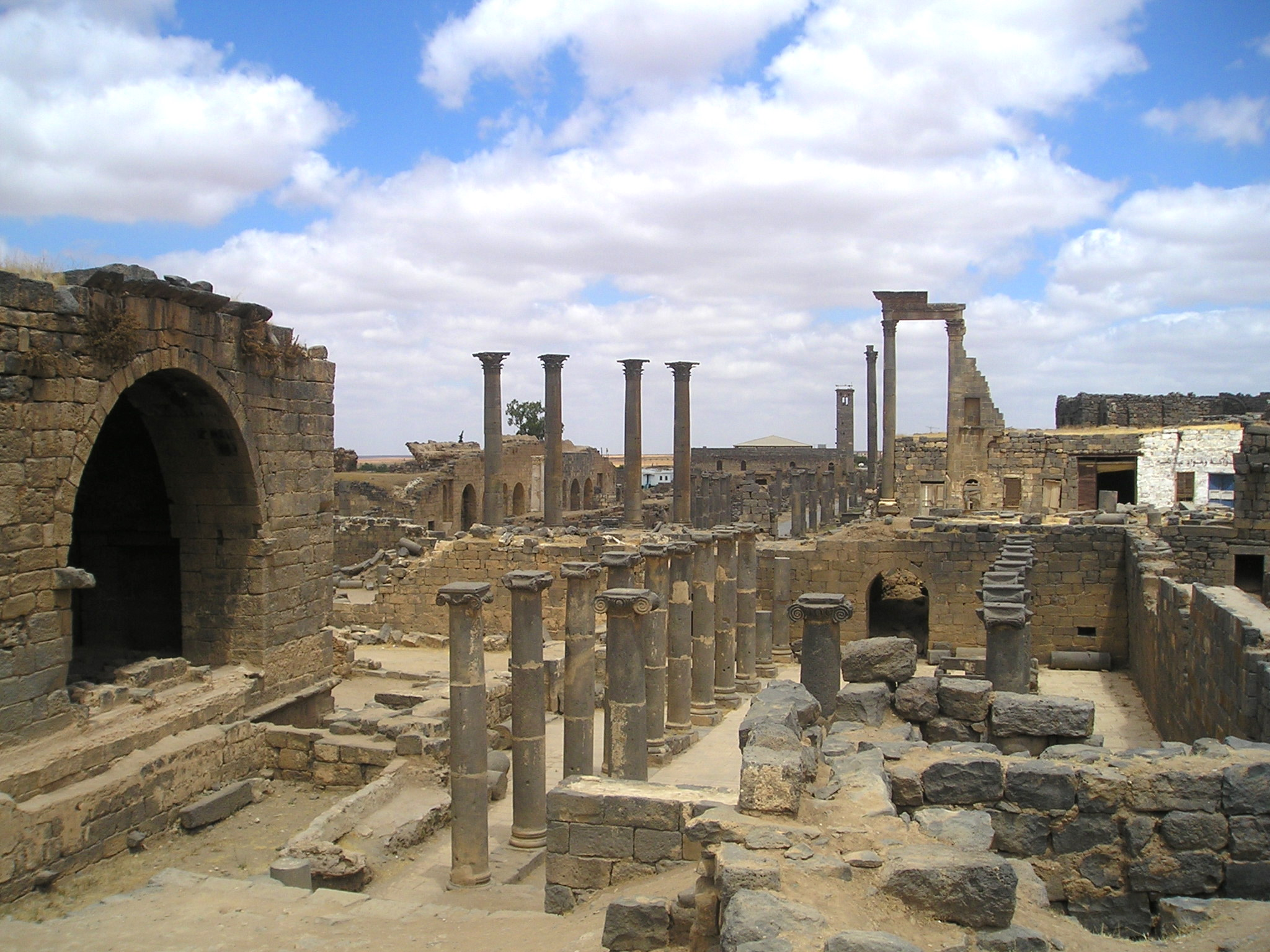
- Bostra's Roman ruins
Date	270
Location	Bostra, Arabia Petraea (in modern-day Syria)
Result	Palmyrene victory

Belligerents
Roman Empire; Tanukhids	Palmyra

Commanders and leaders
Trassus †	Zabdas; Zenobia

Units involved
Legio III Cyrenaica	Palmyrene army

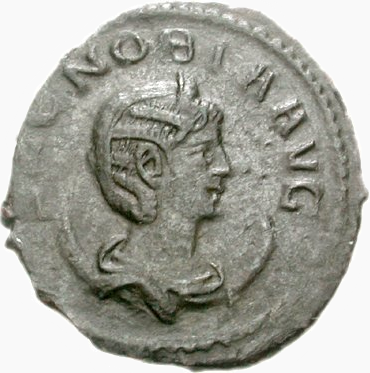
Zenobia of Palmyra

The sack of Bostra occurred around the spring of 270 AD during the Crisis of the Third Century, when Queen Zenobia of Palmyra sent her general, Zabdas, to Bostra, the capital of Arabia Petraea, to subjugate the Tanukhids who were challenging Palmyrene authority.

The sack marked the beginning of Zenobia's military operations to consolidate Palmyrene authority over the Roman east. During the sack, the governor of Arabia Petraea at the time, a certain Trassus, attempted to confront the Palmyrenes but was defeated and killed, while the city was sacked and the Legio III Cyrenaica's revered shrine, the temple of Zeus Hammon, was destroyed.

The sack of the city was shortly followed by the subjugation of Arabia and Palaestina, and later a conquest of Egypt, and is the first in the string of events which ended in the Near East's succession from the Roman Empire and the formation of an independent Palmyrene Empire.

== Background ==
In 269, while the Romans were occupied with defending the empire against Germanic invasions, Zenobia was consolidating her power; Roman officials in the East were caught between loyalty to the emperor and Zenobia's increasing demands for allegiance.

It is unknown when or why Zenobia resorted to using military force to strengthen her rule, it has been suggested that Roman officials refused to recognize Palmyrene authority, and Zenobia's expeditions were intended to maintain Palmyrene dominance over the east.

Another factor may have been the weakness of Roman central authority over its eastern provinces and its corresponding inability to protect them, which harmed Palmyrene trade and probably convinced Zenobia that the only way to maintain stability in the East was to control the region directly. Paired with the conflict of Palmyra's economic interest; as Bostra and Egypt received trade which would have otherwise passed through Palmyra.

Regardless, the defiance of the Tanukhids and the merchant class of Alexandria against Palmyrene domination triggered a military response from Zenobia.

== Attack ==
The attack seemed to be intentionally timed, as Zenobia commanded Zabdas to move the Palmyrene army south to Bostra while the Romans were preoccupied with their battles against the Goths in the mountains of Thrace.

The Roman governor of Arabia, a certain Trassus, who at the time was commanding the Legio III Cyrenaica, confronted the approaching Palmyrene army, but was routed and killed. As a result, the city of Bostra opened its gates, and the Palmyrene army captured and sacked the city, and destroyed the temple of Zeus Hammon, the legion's revered shrine.

== Aftermath ==
After the victory, Zabdas marched across Jordan Valley and apparently met little opposition. Petra, south of Bostra, was attacked as well, and the Palmyrene army had now penetrated the region. Arabia and the rest of the Roman east were now subdued under Palmyrene control.

A Latin inscription after the fall of Zenobia attests to the sack of the city mentioning the "Palmyrene enemies" and the destruction of the temple:

The temple of Iuppiter Hammon, destroyed by the Palmyrene enemies, which ... rebuilt, with a silver statue and iron doors (?).

== See also ==
- Gallic Empire
- Emperor Aurelian

== Sources ==
- Dodgeon, Michael H; Lieu, Samuel N. C (2002). The Roman Eastern Frontier and the Persian Wars AD 226–363: A Documentary History. Routledge. ISBN 978-1-134-96113-9.
- Southern, Patricia (2008). Empress Zenobia: Palmyra's Rebel Queen. A&C Black. ISBN 978-1-4411-4248-1.
- Watson, Alaric (2004) [1999]. Aurelian and the Third Century. Routledge. ISBN 978-1-134-90815-8.
- Young, Gary K. (2003). Rome's Eastern Trade: International Commerce and Imperial Policy 31 BC – AD 305. Routledge. ISBN 978-1-134-54793-7.
