= Battle of Emesa =

Battle between Palmyrene and Roman armies (272)

Coordinates: 34.72°N 36.71°E

- Part of The Crisis of the Third Century
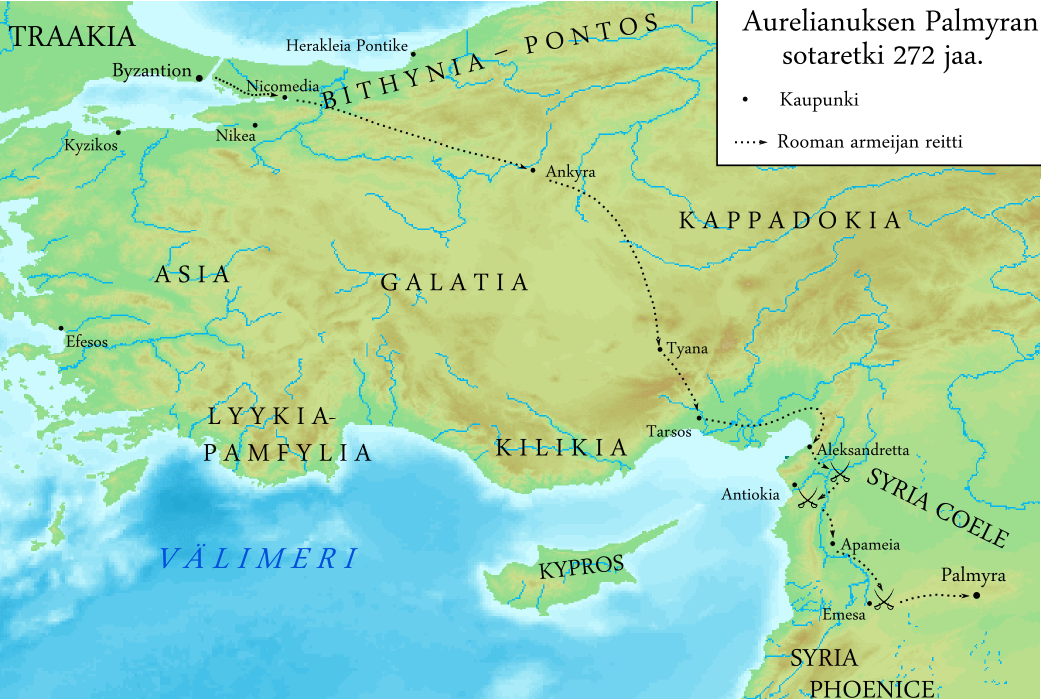
Date	272 A.D.
Location	Emesa, Syria
Result	Roman victory: Collapse of the Palmyrene Empire.

Belligerents
Roman Empire	Palmyrene Empire

Commanders and leaders
Emperor Aurelian	Empress Zenobia; Zabdas

Strength
180,000; Engaged: 60,000 infantry 5,000 cavalry (According to Zosimus)	70,000

Casualties and losses
Unknown, probably light	Heavy

The Battle of Emesa was fought in 272 between the Roman armies led by their emperor Aurelian and the Palmyrene forces led by their empress, Zenobia and general Zabdas.

== Background ==
Aurelian had started a campaign to reconquer the secessionist Palmyrene Empire, led by Empress Zenobia, regent of her son, Emperor Vaballathus. The Palmyrene Empire had already conquered most of the former provinces of the Roman east, including territory spanning from Ancyra to Alexandria.

In 272, Aurelian crossed the Bosphorus and advanced quickly through Anatolia. Marcus Aurelius Probus regained Egypt from Palmyra, while the emperor continued his march and reached Tyana. The fall of Tyana lent itself to a legend; Aurelian to that point had destroyed every city that resisted him, but he spared Tyana after having a vision of the great philosopher Apollonius of Tyana, whom he respected greatly, in a dream. Whatever the reason for his clemency, Aurelian sparing Tyana paid off, many more cities submitted to him upon seeing that the emperor would not exact revenge upon them.

Entering Issus and heading to Antioch, Aurelian defeated Zenobia in the Battle of Immae. Zenobia retreated to Antioch then to Emesa.

== Preparations ==
=== Roman preparations ===
Aurelian, after his victory over Zenobia at Immae and over the Palmyrene garrison at Daphne, briefly stayed in Antioch to secure the city and attend to its administrative and governmental matters. The most important factor of the emperor's temporary residence in the city was that it enabled him to gather reinforcements for the army; the legions of Mesopotamia sent detachments, Tyana provided levies while auxiliary clubmen from Palestine were enlisted in the ranks of the Roman Army.

=== Palmyrene preparations ===
Aurelian's delay in the pursuit of the Palmyrene army allowed Aurelian to rest and reinforce his army, but it bought time for Zenobia to do the same. Similarly, she took up residence in Emesa, assembled the remnants of her army and brought in auxiliaries from her allies.

Despite the empress's setback at Immae, she was not defeated yet. Her army was mauled, but not shattered. Zabdas was still a capable general whose cavalry was superior to Aurelian's both in quality and quantity, and Zenobia still held on to most of her power and influence.

== The Battle ==
As at Immae, Zabdas formed up the Palmyrene army on a flat plain near Emesa where he could deploy his cavalry. Aurelian accepted battle on the ground chosen by Zabdas, and attempted to repeat the ruse he conducted in Immae to order his cavalry to pretend to flee. Whatsoever, the Palmyrene heavy cavalry attacked furiously, repelling the Roman cavalry. The Romans were close to losing but as at Immae, the Palmyrene heavy cavalry, motivated by the thrill of a sure victory, dispersed in the pursuit of the Roman cavalry, and were massacred by the Roman infantry and the Palestinian clubmen.

== Aftermath ==
The defeat at the Battle of Emesa forced what was left of the Palmyrene armies to retreat to the capital of their empire, the city of Palmyra where Zenobia and her son sought to gather forces to resist Aurelian's legions. Unlike Zenobia's coordinated and orderly withdrawal from Antioch, her withdrawal was tremendously hastened forcing her to leave the imperial treasury behind at the city.

The Romans began to besiege Palmyra, and tried to breach the city's defences several times. But, the Roman attacks were repelled by the city's defenders. However, as the siege dragged on the situation inside the capital, Palmyra, worsened, so Zenobia left the city and fled eastwards in the direction of Persia to ask the Sasanian Empire for support and much needed aid in the war against the Roman Empire. However, she was captured by Roman soldiers soon after she reached the eastern bank of the Euphrates river as she searched for a way to cross the river. After capturing her the Roman soldiers took her to their Emperor. Soon after hearing that their empress had been captured, the citizens of Palmyra asked the Emperor for peace, and the city fell to the Romans.

What became of Zenobia and her son is unknown, but the fate of her city, Palmyra, however, was clearer and certainly more bleak. The city, back under Roman rule, revolted again, but was sacked by Aurelian who looted its temples, massacred its citizens, and destroyed the city's fortifications so that it may never again become a threat to Roman rule in the east.
