= Septimius Antiochus =

Late 3rd century Palmyrene rebel leader

Antiochus Άντίοχος
- Augustus of Syria

Emperor of Palmyra
- Reign: early 273– spring 273 AD
- Successor: none (reconquered by Aurelian)
- Predecessor: Vaballathus; Zenobia
- Born: Septimius Antiochus; Palmyra, Syria
- Died: After 273
- House: House of Odaenathus
- Father: Odaenathus (unsure)
- Mother: Zenobia (unsure)
- Religion: Palmyrene paganism

Septimius Antiochus (Greek: Άντίοχος; died after 273) was a Roman usurper in Syria during the 3rd century.

In 272 AD, Emperor Aurelian had defeated the breakaway Kingdom of Palmyra; its king, Vaballathus, and his mother, Zenobia, were in Roman captivity. In 273 AD, another rebellion against Roman rule broke out in Palmyra. The rebels first approached Aurelian's governor, Marcellinus, about becoming emperor, but he pretended to consider the offer while sending a letter to Aurelian warning of the rebellion. While the rebels waited, they decided to elevate Septimius Antiochus, the reputed son of Zenobia, to the purple. When the emperor received Marcellinus' letter, he acted quickly, and the city was restored to Roman rule in the spring of 273. Aurelian punished the city severely, but is said to have spared Antiochus.

Antiochus claimed to be descended from Queen Cleopatra VII of Egypt and the kings of Syria. There is some doubt about his relationship to Zenobia. He may be unrelated, claiming kinship for political purposes; he may be her father, also named Antiochus; he may actually be her biological son, or possibly an adopted son; he may be a son of Zenobia by someone other than Odaenathus, in which case he would have been quite young, perhaps as young as five.

== Sources ==
- Zosimus, Historia Nova 1,60-61
