= Palmyrene Empire =

Breakaway state from Roman Empire (270–273)

Coordinates: 34°33′18″N 38°16′3″E

- 260 (as kingdom)/270 (as empire)–273
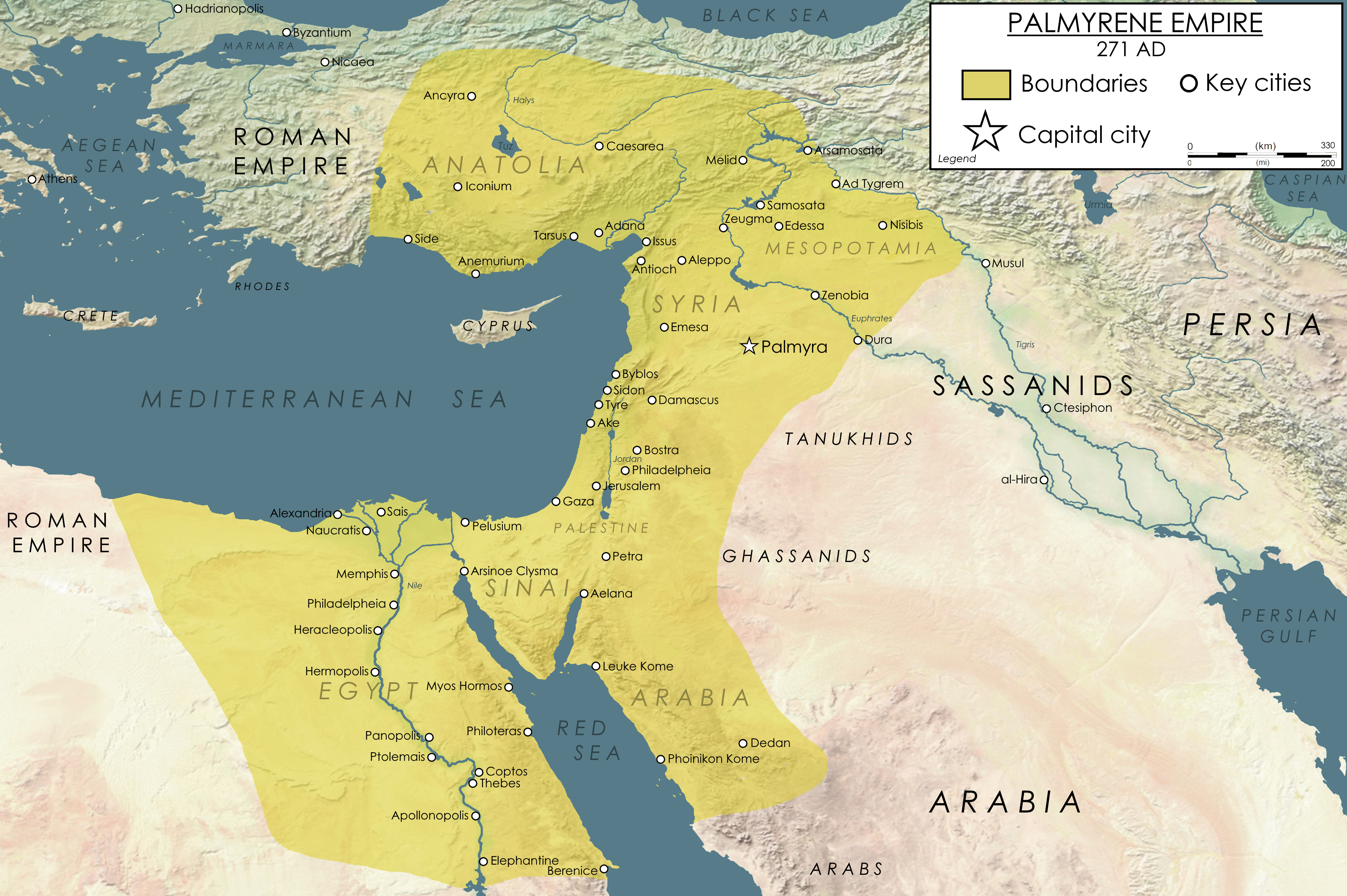
- The Palmyrene Empire in 271
- Capital: Palmyra
- Largest city: Alexandria (Note: Alexandria was the second largest city in the Roman Empire (after Rome itself), with a population of around 500,000–600,000, during the principate. The population of Palmyra in the middle of the 3rd century is estimated to have been 150,000–200,000.)
- Common languages: Palmyrene Aramaic; Greek; Arabic
- Government: Monarchy
- Monarch
  - 267/270–272: Vaballathus
  - 272–273: Zenobia
  - 273: Antiochus
- Historical era: Late Antiquity
  - Established: 260 (as kingdom)/270 (as empire)
  - Disestablished: 273
Preceded by	Succeeded by
Roman Empire	Roman Empire

The Palmyrene Empire was a short-lived breakaway state from the Roman Empire resulting from the Crisis of the Third Century. Named after its capital city, Palmyra, its territory included the Roman provinces of Syria Palaestina, Arabia Petraea, and Egypt, as well as large parts of Asia Minor.

The Palmyrene Empire was ruled by Queen Zenobia, officially as regent for her son Vaballathus, who inherited the throne in 267 at age ten. In 270, Zenobia rapidly conquered most of the Roman east, attempting to maintain relations with Rome as a legitimate power. In 271, she claimed the imperial title for both herself and her son, fighting a short war with the Roman emperor Aurelian, who conquered Palmyra and captured Zenobia. A year later the Palmyrenes rebelled, which led Aurelian to raze Palmyra.

Despite its brief existence, the Palmyrene Empire is remembered for having been ruled by one of the most ambitious and powerful women in antiquity. It is also hailed in modern-day Syria, where it plays an important role as an icon in Syrian nationalism.

== Background ==
Following the murder of Roman emperor Alexander Severus in 235, general after general squabbled over control of the empire, the frontiers were neglected and subjected to frequent raids by Carpians, Goths and Alemanni, in addition to outright attacks from the aggressive Sassanids in the east. Finally, Shapur I of Persia inflicted a disastrous defeat upon the Romans at the Battle of Edessa in 260, capturing the Roman emperor Valerian and soon, Quietus and Macrianus rebelled against Valerian's son Gallienus and usurped the imperial power in Syria.

The Palmyrene leader Odaenathus was declared king, and remained nominally loyal to Gallienus, forming an army of Palmyrenes and Syrian peasants to attack Shapur. (Note: No evidence exists for Roman units serving in the ranks of Odaenathus; whether Roman soldiers fought under Odaenathus or not is a matter of speculation.) In 260, Odaenathus won a decisive victory over Shapur in a battle near the Euphrates. Next, Odaenathus defeated the usurpers in 261, and spent the remainder of his reign fighting the Persians. Odaenathus received the title Governor of the East, and ruled Syria as the imperial representative, and declared himself King of Kings. (Note: The first decisive evidence for the use of this title for Odaenathus is an inscription dated to 271, posthumously describing Odaenathus as king of kings. Odaenathus' son Hairan I is directly attested as "King of Kings" during his lifetime. Hairan I was proclaimed by his father as co-ruler; it is unlikely that Odaenathus was simply a king while his son held the King of Kings title.) Odaenathus was assassinated along with his son Hairan in 267; according to Joannes Zonaras and the Historia Augusta, he was killed by his cousin, whose name is given by the latter source as Maeonius. The Historia Augusta also claims that Maeonius was proclaimed emperor for a very brief period, before being executed by the soldiers. No inscriptions or other evidence exist for Maeonius' reign, and he was probably killed immediately after assassinating Odaenathus.

Odaenathus was succeeded by his minor son, the ten-year-old Vaballathus, under the regency of Zenobia. Vaballathus was kept in the shadow while his mother assumed actual rule and consolidated her power. The queen was careful not to provoke Rome and took for herself and her son the titles that her husband had, while working on guaranteeing the safety of the borders with Persia, and pacifying the dangerous Tanukhid tribes in Hauran.

== Establishment ==
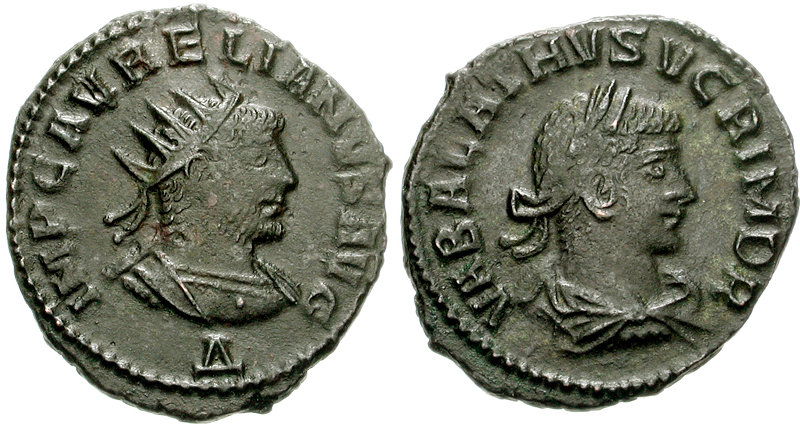
Vaballathus (right) as king on the obverse of an Antoninianus. To the left, Aurelian as Augustus on the reverse.

Zenobia started an expedition against the Tanukhids in the spring of 270, during the reign of emperor Claudius Gothicus aided by her generals, Septimius Zabbai (a general of the army) and Septimius Zabdas (the chief general of the army).

Zabdas sacked Bosra, killed the Roman governor, and marched south securing Roman Arabia. According to the Persian geographer Ibn Khordadbeh, Zenobia herself attacked Dumat Al-Jandal but could not conquer its castle. However, Ibn Khordadbeh likely confused Zenobia with al-Zabbā, a semi-legendary Arab queen whose story is often confused with Zenobia's story.

In October of 270, a Palmyrene army of 70,000 invaded Egypt, and declared Zenobia queen of Egypt. The Roman general Tenagino Probus was able to regain Alexandria in November, but was defeated and escaped to the fortress of Babylon, where he was besieged and committed suicide after being captured by Zabdas, who continued his march south and secured Egypt. Afterward, in 271, Zabbai started the operations in Asia Minor, and was joined by Zabdas in the spring of that year. The Palmyrenes subdued Galatia, and occupied Ancyra, marking the greatest extent of the Palmyrene expansion. However, the attempts to conquer Chalcedon were unsuccessful.

The Palmyrene conquests were done under the protective show of subordination to Rome. Zenobia issued coinage in the name of Claudius' successor Aurelian with Vaballathus depicted as king, (Note: Claudius died in August 270, shortly before Zenobia's invasion of Egypt.) while the emperor allowed the Palmyrene coinage and conferred the Palmyrene royal titles. However, toward the end of 271, Vaballathus took the title of Augustus along with his mother.

== Reconquest by Rome ==
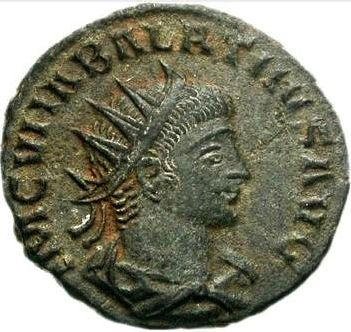
Vaballathus as Augustus, on the obverse of an Antoninianus.

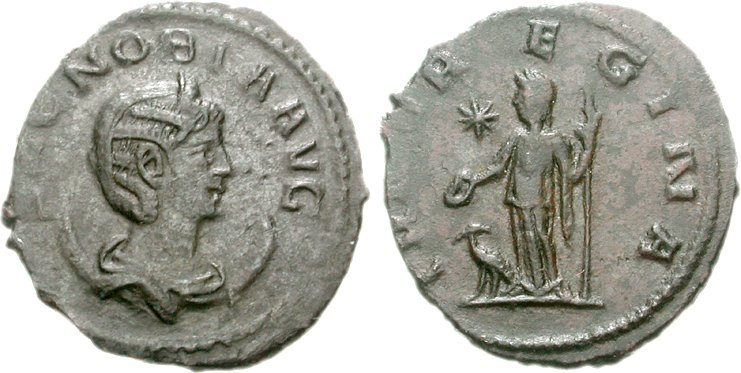
Zenobia as Augusta, on the obverse of an Antoninianus.

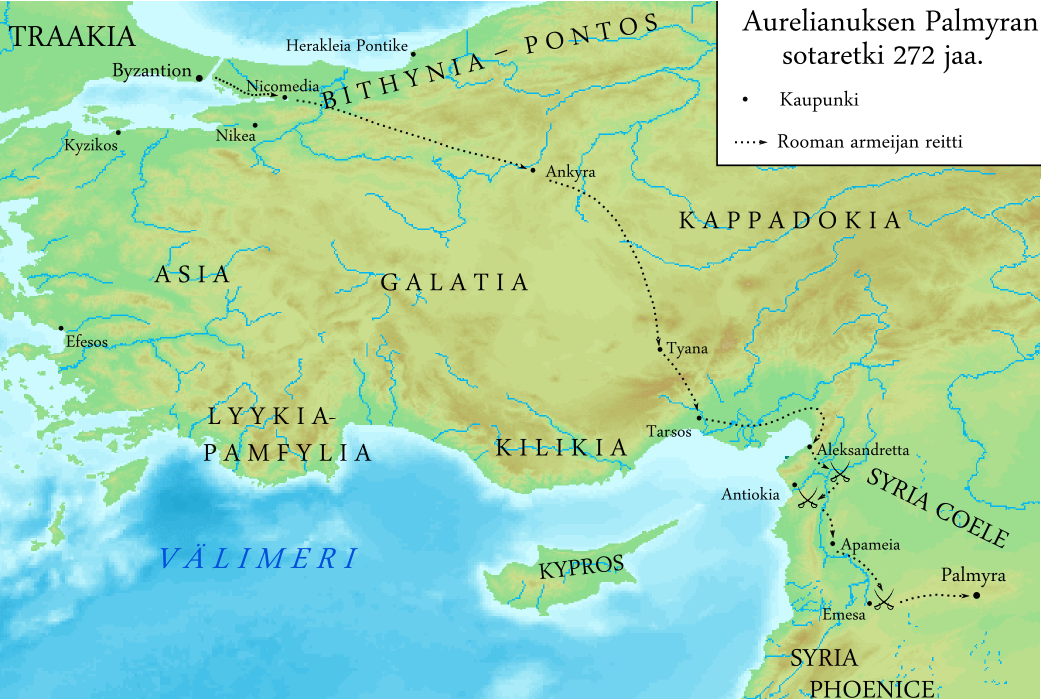
Aurelian-Zenobia war.

In 272, Aurelian crossed the Bosphorus and advanced quickly through Anatolia. According to one account, Marcus Aurelius Probus regained Egypt from Palmyra, (Note: All other accounts indicate that a military action was not necessary, as it seems that Zenobia had withdrawn her forces in order to defend Syria.) while the emperor continued his march and reached Tyana. The fall of Tyana lent itself to a legend; Aurelian to that point had destroyed every city that resisted him, but he spared Tyana after having a vision of the great philosopher Apollonius of Tyana, whom he respected greatly, in a dream. Apollonius implored him, stating: "Aurelian, if you desire to rule, abstain from the blood of the innocent! Aurelian, if you will conquer, be merciful!". Whatever the reason for his clemency, Aurelian's sparing of Tyana paid off; many more cities submitted to him upon seeing that the emperor would not exact revenge upon them.

Entering Issus and heading to Antioch, Aurelian defeated Zenobia in the Battle of Immae. Zenobia retreated to Antioch then fled to Emesa while Aurelian advanced and took the former. After regrouping, the Romans first destroyed a Palmyrene garrison stationed at the fort of Daphne, (Note: Daphne was a garden located six miles south of Antioch.) and headed south to Apamea, then continued to Emesa and defeated Zenobia again at the Battle of Emesa, forcing her to evacuate to the capital. Aurelian marched through the desert and was harassed by Bedouins loyal to Palmyra, but as soon as he arrived at the city gates, he negotiated with the Bedouins, who betrayed Palmyra and supplied the Roman army with water and food. Aurelian besieged Palmyra in the summer of 272, and tried to negotiate with Zenobia, on the condition that she surrender herself in person to him, to which she answered with refusal. The Romans tried to breach the city defenses several times but were repelled, however, as the situation deteriorated, Zenobia left the city and headed east to ask the Persians for help. The Romans followed the empress, captured her near the Euphrates and brought her back to the emperor. Soon after, the Palmyrene citizens asked for peace, and the city capitulated.

=== Aftermath ===
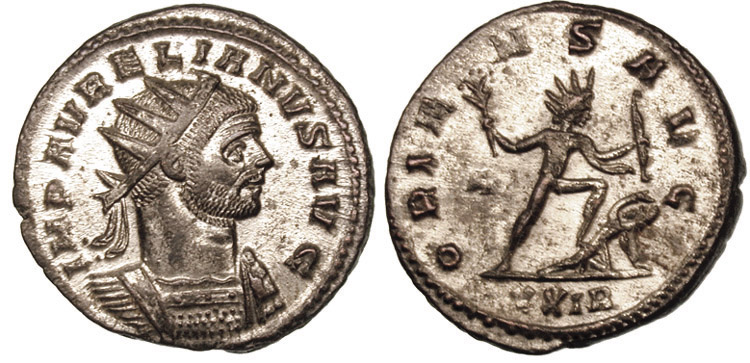
Aurelian, personification of Sol, defeats the Palmyrene Empire, and celebrates ORIENS AVG, the Augustus Rising Sun.

Aurelian spared the city and stationed a garrison of 600 archers led by a certain Sandarion, as a peacekeeping force. The defenses were destroyed and most of the military equipment was confiscated. Zenobia and her council were taken to Emesa and put on trial. Most of the high-ranking Palmyrene officials were executed, while Zenobia's and Vaballathus's fates are uncertain.

In 273, Palmyra rebelled under the leadership of a citizen named Septimius Apsaios, and contacted the Roman prefect of Mesopotamia, Marcellinus, offering to help him usurp the imperial power. Marcellinus delayed the negotiations and sent word to the Roman emperor, while the rebels lost their patience and declared a relative of Zenobia named Antiochus as Augustus. Aurelian marched against Palmyra and was helped by a Palmyrene faction from inside the city, headed by a man with a senatorial rank named Septimius Haddudan.

Aurelian spared Antiochus, but razed Palmyra. The most valuable monuments were taken by the emperor to decorate his Temple of Sol, while buildings were smashed, people were clubbed and cudgeled and Palmyra's holiest temple pillaged.

== Evaluation and legacy ==
The ultimate motive behind the revolt is debated; when dealing with the rise of Palmyra and the rebellion of Zenobia, historians most often interpreted the ascendancy as an indication of cultural, ethnic or social factors. Andreas Alföldi viewed the rebellion as a completely native ethnic opposition against Rome. Irfan Shahîd considered Zenobia's revolt a pan-Arab movement that was a forerunner of the Arab expansion of the Caliphates; an opinion shared by Franz Altheim, and an almost universal view amongst Arab and Syrian scholars such as Philip Khuri Hitti. Mark Whittow disagreed that the revolt was ethnic in its nature and emphasized that it was a reaction to the weakness of Rome and its inability to protect Palmyra from the Persians. Warwick Ball viewed the rebellion as aimed at Rome's throne, not just Palmyrene independence. Vaballathus' inscriptions indicated the style of a Roman emperor; according to Ball, Zenobia and Vaballathus were contenders for the Roman imperial throne, following a plan similar to that of Vespasian, who ascended the throne after building his power-base in Syria. Andrew M. Smith II considered the revolt as a bid for both independence and the Roman throne. The Palmyrene royalty used Eastern titles such as king of kings, which had no relevance in Roman politics, while the conquests were in the interest of Palmyrene commerce. Finally, it was only in the last regnal year of Zenobia and Vaballathus that the Roman imperial rank was claimed. Fergus Millar, although tending toward the view that it was not only an independence movement, believes there is not yet enough evidence to draw a conclusion on the nature of Palmyra's revolt.

During the mid-twentieth century, interest in the Palmyrene Empire was briefly revived by the advent of Syrian nationalism. Modern Syrian nationalists viewed the empire as a uniquely Syrian civilization which attempted to liberate the masses of the Levant from Roman rule. A Syrian TV show was produced based on Zenobia's life, and she was the subject of a biography written by Syria's former minister of defense Mustafa Tlass.

== See also ==
- Gallic Empire

== Bibliography ==
- Nakamura, Byron (1993). "Palmyra and the Roman East". Greek, Roman, and Byzantine Studies. 34. Duke University, Department of Classical Studies. ISSN 0017-3916.
- Hitti, Philip K. (2002) [1937]. History of The Arabs (10 ed.). Palgrave Macmillan. ISBN 978-1-137-13032-7.
- Zahrān, Yāsamīn (2003). Zenobia between reality and legend. BAR (British Archaeological Reports) International Series. Vol. 1169. Archaeopress. ISBN 978-1-84171-537-7.
- Whittow, Mark (2010). "The late Roman/early Byzantine Near East". In Robinson, Chase F. (ed.). The New Cambridge History of Islam, Volume 1: The Formation of the Islamic World, Sixth to Eleventh Centuries. Cambridge: Cambridge University Press. ISBN 978-0-521-83823-8.
- Ball, Warwick (2002). Rome in the East: The Transformation of an Empire. Routledge. ISBN 978-1-134-82387-1.
- Smith II, Andrew M. (2013). Roman Palmyra: Identity, Community, and State Formation. Oxford University Press. ISBN 978-0-19-986110-1.
- Millar, Fergus (1993). The Roman Near East, 31 B.C.-A.D. 337. Harvard University Press. ISBN 978-0-674-77886-3.
