= Zabdas =

3rd century Egyptian Palmyrene general

- Born: Palmyra, Roman Syria
- Died: c. 273 Emesa, Roman Syria
- Allegiance: Palmyrene Empire
- Branch: Palmyrene army
- Service years: 270-273
- Conflicts: Sack of Bostra; Palmyrene invasion of Egypt; Battle of Immae; Battle of Emesa

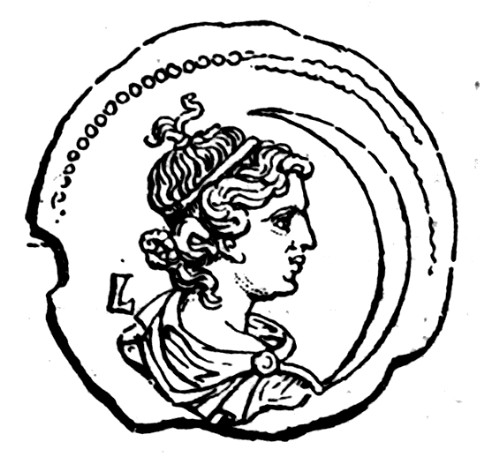
A sketch of a coin minted by Zenobia

Zabdas was a 3rd-century general (an Egyptian according to ancient sources like Zosimus and Historia Augusta) who led the forces of Empress Zenobia of Palmyra during her rule as regent of her son Vaballathus and her subsequent rebellion against the Roman Emperor under the short-lived independent Palmyrene Empire. He led Palmyra's expeditions in the middle east which included annexing territory spanning from Roman Egypt to Asia Minor.

Following Emperor Aurelian's campaign in the east and the fall of Palmyra, Zabdas, among other notable Palmyrene officials including Cassius Longinus was executed in Emesa after being held on trial by the emperor.

== Campaigns ==
=== Expedition against the Tanukhids ===
Aided by another general of the army, Septimius Zabbai, and Zenobia herself, Zabdas started an expedition against the Tanukhids in the spring of 270, during the reign of emperor Claudius II.

Reasons cited for Palmyra's military campaign in Arabia are the weakness of Roman central authority over its eastern provinces and its corresponding inability to protect them, which harmed Palmyra's trade and probably convinced Zenobia that the only way to maintain stability in the East was to control the region directly. The conflict of Palmyra's economic interest with as Bostra and Egypt receiving trade which would have otherwise passed through Palmyra also played a part.

Regardless, the defiance of the Tanukhids against Palmyrene domination is probably the main reason which triggered a military response from Zenobia.

The attack seemed to be intentionally timed, as the Palmyrene army south to Bostra while the Romans were preoccupied with their battles against the Goths in the mountains of Thrace.

The Roman governor of Arabia, a certain Trassus, confronted Palmyra's approaching army while commanding the Legio III Cyrenaica, but was routed and killed in action. As a result, the city of Bostra surrendered, and the Palmyrene army captured and sacked the city, and destroyed the temple of Zeus Hammon, the legion's revered shrine.

=== Invasion of Egypt ===
In October of 270, a Palmyrene army of 70,000 invaded Egypt, led by Zabdas.

The invasion of Egypt is sometimes explained by Zenobia's desire to secure an alternative trade route to the Euphrates, which was cut because of the war with Persia, although the Euphrates route was only partially disrupted, and Zenobia's personal ambition and political motivation to establish Palmyrene dominance over the east definitely played a part in her decision to invade Egypt.

The Palmyrenes entered Alexandria, and left a garrison of 5,000, although shortly after, Tenagino Probus, Egypt's prefect, who was occupied with naval expeditions against pirates, was alerted of the situation in Egypt and quickly returned there. He recaptured Alexandria, but the Palmyrene army shortly thereafter regained control of the city. Probus retreated to Babylon Fortress. Although Timagenes, a native of Egypt with knowledge of the land who was aiding Zabdas during the invasion, ambushed the Roman rear and captured the fortress. Tenagino Probus ended up committing suicide, and the Palmyrenes consolidated their dominion over Egypt.

=== Campaigns in Asia Minor ===
Afterward, in 271, Zabbai, another Palmyrene general serving Zenobia, started the operations in Asia Minor, and was joined by Zabdas in the spring of that year. The Palmyrenes annexed Galatia and, according to Zosimus, reached Ancyra. Bithynia and the Cyzicus mint remained beyond Zenobia's control, and her attempts to subdue Chalcedon failed. The Asia Minor campaign is poorly documented, but the western part of the region did not become part of the empress's authority.

By August 271 Zabdas was back in Palmyra, with the Palmyrene empire at its zenith.

== Battles against Aurelian ==
In 272, the Emperor Aurelian crossed the Bosphorus and advanced quickly through Anatolia, to reconquer the lost provinces now under Palmyra.

Entering Issus and heading to Antioch, Aurelian defeated Zabdas in the Battle of Immae, near Antioch. The Palmyrene armies retreated to Antioch then later Emesa while Aurelian advanced. The defeat at Emesa forced the Palmyrene armies to evacuate to the capital. The Romans began a siege, and tried to breach the city defenses several times but were repelled, however, the situation worsened, so Zenobia, Vaballathus's mother, left the city and headed east to ask the Sassanians, for help. The Romans whatsoever followed the empress, arrested her near the Euphrates and brought her back to the Roman emperor. Soon after, the Palmyrene citizens asked for peace, and the city fell.

== Death ==
Zenobia, Vaballathus and her war council, including Zabdas, were taken to Emesa and put on trial. Most of the high ranking Palmyrene officials were executed, which might have included Zabdas, as he is not mentioned in any account of Zenobia's life after the fall of Palmyra.

== Sources ==
- Bryce, Trevor (2014). Ancient Syria: A Three Thousand Year History. Oxford University Press. ISBN 978-0-19-100292-2.
- Bunson, Matthew (2002). Encyclopedia of the Roman empire. Facts On File. ISBN 978-0-81-604562-4.
- Smith II, Andrew M. (2013). Roman Palmyra: Identity, Community, and State Formation. Oxford University Press. ISBN 978-0-19-986110-1.
- Southern, Patricia (2008). Empress Zenobia: Palmyra's Rebel Queen. A&C Black. ISBN 978-1-4411-4248-1.
- Stoneman, Richard (2003) [First published 1992]. Palmyra and Its Empire: Zenobia's Revolt Against Rome. University of Michigan Press. ISBN 978-0-472-08315-2.
- Watson, Alaric (2004) [First published 1999]. Aurelian and the Third Century. Routledge. ISBN 978-1-134-90815-8.
- Young, Gary K. (2003). Rome's Eastern Trade: International Commerce and Imperial Policy 31 BC – AD 305. Routledge. ISBN 978-1-134-54793-7.
