= Maeonius =

Briefly Emperor of Palmyra in 267

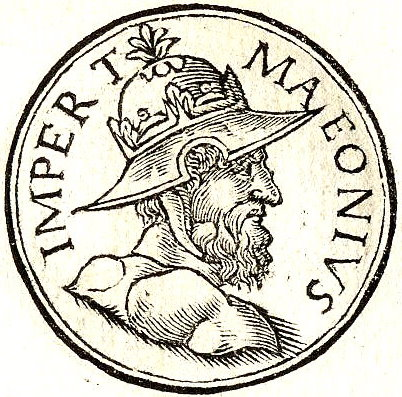
Maeonius from the Promptuarii Iconum Insigniorum

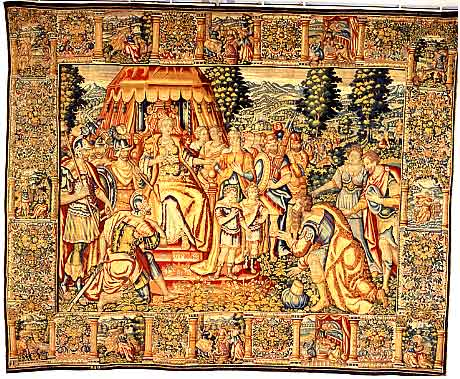
Zenobia sentences to death Maeonius, the murderer of her husband Odaenathus, end of 16th century, Bruxelles manufacture

Maeonius (died 267), or Maconius, was a usurper who, according to the Historia Augusta, briefly ruled over Palmyra. He is included in the list of the Thirty Tyrants.

== Life ==
He was the nephew (according to Zonaras xii.24) or the cousin (according to Historia Augusta) of Odaenathus of Palmyra, who had taken control of the eastern provinces of the Roman Empire after the defeat in battle and capture of Emperor Valerian by Shapur I of the Sasanian Empire.

According to Historia Augusta, Maeonius killed Odaenathus and his son Hairan during a celebration, because of a conspiracy organised by Zenobia, wife of Odaenathus, who wanted her sons to succeed her husband instead of Hairan (who was the son of Odaenathus by another woman). According to Gibbon, the murder was revenge for a short confinement imposed on Maeonius by Odaenathus for being disrespectful.

Zonaras tells that Maeonius was killed immediately after the murder of Odaenathus, while Historia has Maeonius proclaiming himself emperor, with Zenobia having him soon killed, in order to take the power for herself.
