= Septimius Zabbai =

3rd century member of the Palmyrene nobility

Zabbai was a Palmyrene man who lived in the third century, and likely was a member of the Palmyrene nobility. Nothing is known about him other than the reference in Queen Zenobia's Palmyrene name recorded in Palmyrene inscriptions, sptymy'btzby, which translates as Septimia Daughter of Zabbai. Zenobia's Palmyrene name might hint at her family origins, and might tie with the medieval tradition recorded by medieval Persian scholar Al-Tabari that she was the daughter of an Arab sheikh. However, it is also possible that Zenobia may not have been Zabbai's daughter, with the inscription implying that she belonged to a family whose ancestral head was Zabbai.

Another man named Zabbai from this time in Palmyrene history is one of Zenobia's generals, who along with Zabdas, fought in her campaigns in the west. It is possible that general Zabbai is of the same family clan of Zenobia whose ancestral head was Zabbai, and he might be the Zabbai mentioned in Palmyrene inscriptions, as names such as Zabdas, Zabbai and Zebeida derive from the same Semitic name which means "given or gift", and were all translated into Greek as the name "Zenobia".
