= Battle of Immae =

Battle between Palmyrene and Roman forces (272)

- Part of The Crisis of the Third Century
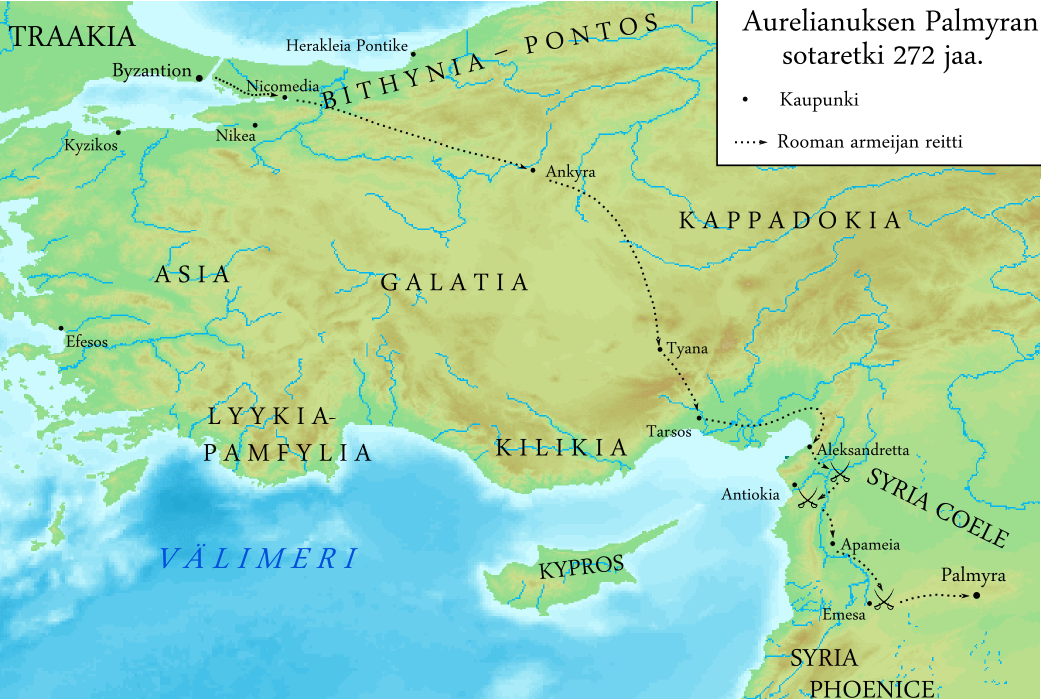
Date	272 AD
Location	Immae, near Antioch, Turkey 36°14′16″N 36°34′10″E
Result	Roman victory

Belligerents
Roman Empire	Palmyrene Empire

Commanders and leaders
Emperor Aurelian	Zenobia; Zabdas

Strength
30,000–50,000 although only around 5,000–7,000 dalmatian, mauritanian, equites, and numidian cavalry were engaged	Around 5,000 Clibinarii Heavy Cavalry
- Location within Syria Battle of Immae (Mediterranean)

The Battle of Immae was fought in 272 between the Roman army of Emperor Aurelian, and the armies of the Palmyrene Empire, whose leader, Empress Zenobia, had usurped Roman control over the eastern provinces.

== Background and prelude to war ==
During the Crisis of the Third Century, Rome had lost its ability to defend its eastern provinces from Sassanid invasion. Septimius Odaenathus, a chieftain out of Palmyra, improvised an army that proved highly successful in repelling the Sassanid onslaught. He was so successful that Gallienus made him a king and protector of the eastern empire. After his death his wife Queen Zenobia assumed direct control (through her son) of the eastern Roman Empire provinces that were under Palmyrian protection. Through shrewd diplomacy she managed to expand her holdings into Egypt and convinced much of Asia Minor to call Palmyra its capital, effectively carving out a Palmyrene Empire. Publicly she maintained the facade of a partnership with Rome by at all times placing her son in the subordinate position to Aurelian in all official documents, letterhead, and coins that were minted.

In Aurelian's eyes her entrance into Egypt, still considered a strictly personal province of the Emperor, was nothing short of a declaration of war. Despite this Aurelian had been unable to challenge her actions directly due to the constant invasion by Germanic tribes. Finally after devastating victories over the Alamanni, fortifying the region with city walls, and abandoning Dacia he felt Rome was safe enough to begin a campaign into the east.

== Preparations ==
=== Roman preparations ===
Realising his army was far too cumbersome to invade Egypt effectively, Aurelian sent one of his generals with a fleet to attempt to drive out the Palmyrene garrison stationed there. Meanwhile, once Emperor Aurelian restored his army to its full strength he began to march towards the city of Antioch.

=== Palmyrene preparations ===
Realising that the charade was over, Empress Zenobia dropped all pretenses and had her son declared augustus and mobilised an army to meet Aurelian in the field under the command of her capable general Zabdas.

== Battle ==
Both armies took the field "near" Antioch at Immae (close by Reyhanli, Turkey) in traditional battle formations with infantry in the center and cavalry on the flanks. Zabdas had two big advantages at his disposal: first was the superiority of his cataphracts, and the second was the extreme heat the Romans were not adapted to. Aurelian understood the situation as well, and planned to use a tactic implemented by Claudius Gothicus against the Goths, turning both disadvantages into decisive advantages.

After some skirmishes Zabdas wanted to seize the initiative and called for a cavalry charge which forced Aurelian to counter with his own cavalry charge. When the two forces were close to engaging the Roman light cavalry suddenly broke ranks, routed, and left the battlefield. Zabdas, smelling blood and certain victory, ordered his much heavier cataphracts to give chase. After a while the lengthy chase and hot sun started to wear more on the heavily armored Palmyrene horses and men but their seemingly unshakable confidence in the superiority of their cavalry spurred them to ride on. At a predetermined point the Romans wheeled around and suddenly attacked the exhausted and surprised cavalry. The trap was devastating, and very few of the Palmyrene cavalry made it back alive.

After hearing of the destruction of his cavalry Zabdas realized the day was lost. His infantry was no match for the battle-hardened legionaries and immediately ordered a full retreat to Antioch. Understanding the inevitability of Antioch's fall, Empress Zenobia and Zabdas resupplied their forces and moved them under the cover of darkness out of Antioch to Emesa.

== Aftermath ==
In the morning the senior officials of Antioch found they had been abandoned and Aurelian's reputation for savage retribution began to fill them with paralysing fear. Having no choice they opened their gates to Aurelian and prepared for the worst. In a surprise move Aurelian did not kill the senior leadership or even allow his troops to sack the city but instead granted a general amnesty. This show of mercy had a rippling effect throughout the east as city after city, no longer fearing retribution, accepted their peaceful reincorporation into the fold of the Roman Empire.
