= Septimia gens =

Ancient Roman family

The gens Septimia was a minor plebeian family at ancient Rome. The gens first appears in history towards the close of the Republic, and they did not achieve much importance until the latter half of the second century, when Lucius Septimius Severus obtained the imperial dignity.

== Origin ==
The nomen Septimius is a patronymic surname, derived from the rare Latin praenomen Septimus, originally given to a seventh child or seventh son, or to a child born in September, originally the seventh month of the Roman calendar. Several other gentes obtained their nomina in this way, including the Quinctii from Quintus, the Sextii from Sextus, and the Octavii from Octavius.

== Praenomina ==
The chief praenomina of the Septimii were Publius, Lucius, Gaius, and Titus. There are a few instances of other names, including Aulus, Marcus, and Quintus. The ancestor of the family must have been named Septimus, although none of the members who are known to history bore this praenomen.

== Branches and cognomina ==
The Septimii of the Republic were not clearly divided into separate families. A number of surnames are found at various periods, of which the most notable are Severus, meaning "stern, serious, severe," Aper, a wild boar, and Geta, referring to one of the Getae, a Thracian people. All three cognomina were associated with the imperial family. They were of equestrian rank, and had probably lived in Leptis Magna for some time, for Statius addressed one of his poems to a certain Septimius Severus of that city.

== Members ==
This list includes abbreviated praenomina. For an explanation of this practice, see filiation.

- Titus Septimius Sabinus, curule aedile at some point following the consulship of Lucullus in 74 BC.
- Publius Septimius Scaevola, a senator, who was one of the judges allegedly bribed by Aulus Cluentius Habitus in order to obtain the condemnation of Statius Albius Oppianicus in 74 BC. Septimius was condemned two years later, ostensibly on a charge of repetundae, or extortion, but probably due instead to his actions during the trial of Oppianicus.
- Septimius, a participant in the conspiracy of Catiline, who was sent into the ager Picenus in 63 BC.
- Lucius Septimius, a centurion in the command of Pompeius in 67 BC, during the war against the pirates. He then went to Egypt, where he served under Aulus Gabinius, and remained as part of a garrison supporting Ptolemy XII Auletes and his successors. When Pompeius fled to Egypt after the Battle of Pharsalia, in 48 BC, Septimius slew his old commander.
- Gaius Septimius, a secretary of the consul Marcus Calpurnius Bibulus, in 59 BC.
- Publius Septimius, gave evidence against Lucius Valerius Flaccus in 59 BC.
- Gaius Septimius, as praetor in 57 BC, supported recalling Cicero from exile. He was an augur in 45 BC.
- Publius Septimius, had served as quaestor under Marcus Terentius Varro, who sent him three volumes of his treatise De Lingua Latina. Vitruvius speaks of him in connection with Varro, indicating that this Septimius is probably the author of two books on architecture.
- Septimia, the wife of Sicca, a friend of Cicero.
- Septimius, proscribed by the Second Triumvirate in 43 BC, as his wife was carrying on an affair with one of Antonius' friends. Not realizing his wife's treachery, Septimius fled to her house, where she detained him until his murderers arrived.
- Septimius, a friend of Augustus, and of the poet Horace, who dedicated one of his odes to Septimius.
- Septimius, one of a number of centurions slain in a soldiers' revolt in Germania, following the death of Augustus. He appealed to the legate, Aulus Caecina, for protection, but the soldiers were so insistent on Septimius' fate that the legate eventually yielded to their demands.
- Septimius, a soldier in the Praetorian Guard who attempted to protect the praetorian prefect Nymphidius Sabinus from harm when his men deserted him, and declared their allegiance to Galba in AD 68. Septimius deflected a lance aimed at Nymphidius with his shield, but when other soldiers attacked, the prefect fled for his life, until he was cut down by his pursuers.
- Aulus Septimius Serenus, a lyric poet, of whom only brief fragments are preserved. His subject matter appears to have consisted largely of rural topics.
- Gaius Septimius Vegetus, governor of Egypt from AD 85 to 88.
- Quintus Septimius Romanus, the author of a Latin translation of the Dictys Cretensis, a history of the Trojan War, ostensibly written either in Phoenician, or in Greek using the Phoenician alphabet, and translated into ordinary Greek during the reign of Nero.
- Lucius Septimius Flaccus, consul suffectus in AD 183.
- Septimius, said by Aelius Lampridius to have written a life of Alexander Severus, which he treated as an authority for his own biography of the emperor.
- Quintus Septimius Florens Tertullianus, an early Christian writer, who exposited the doctrine of the Trinity.
- Septimius Haddudan, a Palmyrene official during the third century.
- Septimius Zabbai, a Palmyrene official during the third century.
- Septimius Worod, a Palmyrene official during the third century.
- Septimius Acindynus, consul in AD 340.

=== Septimii Apri, Severi et Getae ===
- Marcus Septimius Aper, probably the great-grandfather of Lucius Septimius Severus, the emperor.
- Septimius Severus, a wealthy eques at Leptis Magna in Africa Proconsularis, to whom Statius addressed one of his poems. He is probably the Lucius Septimius Severus who was sufet and duumvir at Leptis Magna.
- Lucius Septimius (M. f.) Severus, grandfather of the emperor Septimius Severus, sufet and subsequently duumvir of Leptis Magna during the reign of Trajan.
- Gaius Claudius Septimius Aper or Afer, probably the brother of the duumvir Lucius Septimius Severus.
- Publius Septimius L. f. M. n. Geta, father of the emperor Septimius Severus.
- Septimia L. f. M. n. Polla, a sister of Publius Septimius Geta, and aunt of the emperor Septimius Severus. She never married, but her brother set up a silver statue in her honour.
- Publius Septimius Aper, probably a cousin of the emperor Septimius Severus, (Note: The Historia Augusta calls him the emperor's patruus, his paternal uncle.) was consul suffectus in July of AD 153.
- Gaius Septimius C. f. Severus, a cousin of the emperor Septimius Severus, and perhaps the son of Gaius Claudius Septimius Aper, was consul suffectus in AD 160.
- Lucius Septimius P. f. L. n. Severus, emperor from AD 193 to 211.
- Publius Septimius P. f. L. n. Geta, brother of the emperor Septimius Severus, was consul suffectus about AD 191, and ordinarius in 203. He seems to have died during or shortly after the end of his consulship. On his deathbed, he warned his brother of the treachery of Gaius Fulvius Plautianus, the praetorian prefect.
- Septimia P. f. L. n. Octavilla, sister of the emperor Septimius Severus. She may have been the mother of Lucius Flavius Septimius Aper Octavianus, whose career is detailed in an early third-century inscription from Rome, on a monument set up by his daughter, Flavia Neratia Septimia Octavilla.
- Lucius or Gaius Septimius Severus Aper, a native of Leptis Magna, and probably the grandson of Publius Septimius Aper, consul in AD 153, was consul in 207. He is probably same person known as Afer in the Historia Augusta, described as a cousin of the emperor Caracalla, who abruptly ordered his execution at the end of 211 or 212.
- (Lucius) Septimius L. f. P. n. Bassianus, better known as Caracalla, was emperor with his father Septimius Severus from AD 198 to 211, with his brother Geta from 209 to 212, and sole emperor from 212 to 217.
- Publius Septimius L. f. P. n. Geta, the emperor's younger son, was elevated to the rank of Augustus emperor alongside his father, from AD 209 to 211, and then his brother Caracalla from 211 to 212, when he was murdered on his brother's orders.
- Lucius Septimius (Severus), probably the son of Aper or Afer, the ex-consul put to death by Caracalla, and the grandfather of Septimius Bassus.
- Lucius Septimius L. f. Severus, the father of Septimius Bassus, the praefectus urbi.
- Septimius L. f. L. n. Bassus, praefectus urbi from at least 317 to 319.

=== Royal family of Palmyra ===
- Septimius Odaenathus, founder of the Palmyrene kingdom.
- Septimius Herodianus, eldest son of Odaenathus and his first wife, was murdered alongside his father.
- Septimia Zenobia, second wife of Odaenathus, and later queen of the Palmyrene Empire.
- Septimius Vaballathus, younger son of Odaenathus, ruled the Palmyrene Empire with his mother.
- Septimius Antiochus, perhaps a son of Zenobia, he tried to usurp the Palmyrene Empire after it was defeated by Aurelian.

== See also ==
- List of Roman gentes

== Bibliography ==
- Gaius Julius Caesar, Commentarii de Bello Civili (Commentaries on the Civil War).
- Marcus Tullius Cicero, Epistulae ad Atticum, In Verrem, Post Reditum in Senatu, Pro Cluentio, Pro Flacco.
- Gaius Sallustius Crispus (Sallust), Bellum Catilinae (The Conspiracy of Catiline).
- Marcus Terentius Varro, De Lingua Latina (On the Latin Language).
- Marcus Vitruvius Pollio, De Architectura (On Architecture).
- Quintus Horatius Flaccus (Horace), Carmen Saeculare, Epistulae.
- Gaius Plinius Secundus (Pliny the Elder), Historia Naturalis (Natural History).
- Publius Papinius Statius, Silvae.
- Publius Cornelius Tacitus, Annales.
- Lucius Mestrius Plutarchus (Plutarch), Lives of the Noble Greeks and Romans.
- Gaius Suetonius Tranquillus, De Poetis (Lives of the Poets).
- Appianus Alexandrinus (Appian), Bellum Civile (The Civil War).
- Terentianus Maurus, De Litteris, Syllabis, Pedibus, et Metris.
- Lucius Cassius Dio Cocceianus (Cassius Dio), Roman History.
- Herodianus, Tes Meta Marcon Basileas Istoria (History of the Empire from the Death of Marcus Aurelius).
- Aelius Lampridius, Aelius Spartianus, Flavius Vopiscus, Julius Capitolinus, Trebellius Pollio, and Vulcatius Gallicanus, Historia Augusta (Lives of the Emperors).
- Eutropius, Breviarium Historiae Romanae (Abridgement of the History of Rome).
- Sextus Aurelius Victor, De Caesaribus (On the Caesars).
- Maurus Servius Honoratus (Servius), Ad Virgilii Aeneidem Commentarii (Commentary on Vergil's Aeneid).
- Paulus Orosius, Historiarum Adversum Paganos (History Against the Pagans).
- Eusebius Sophronius Hieronymus (St. Jerome), Epistulae.
- Gaius Sollius Modestus Apollinaris Sidonius, Epistulae.
- Pieter Burmann, Anthologia Latina (Latin Anthology), ed. Wernsdorf, (1759–1778).
- Johann Christian Wernsdorf, Poëtae Latini Minores (Minor Latin Poets), Altenburg, Helmstedt (1780–1799).
- Dictionary of Greek and Roman Biography and Mythology, William Smith, ed., Little, Brown and Company, Boston (1849).
- Theodor Mommsen et alii, Corpus Inscriptionum Latinarum (The Body of Latin Inscriptions, abbreviated CIL), Berlin-Brandenburgische Akademie der Wissenschaften (1853–present).
- Paul von Rohden, Elimar Klebs, & Hermann Dessau, Prosopographia Imperii Romani (The Prosopography of the Roman Empire, abbreviated PIR), Berlin (1898).
- Joyce M. Reynolds, J. B. Ward-Perkins, The Inscriptions of Roman Tripolitania, British School at Rome (1952).
- Hans Petersen, "The Numeral Praenomina of the Romans", in Transactions of the American Philological Association, vol. xciii, pp. 347–354 (1962).
- D.P. Simpson, Cassell's Latin and English Dictionary, Macmillan Publishing Company, New York (1963).
- A. H. M. Jones & J. R. Martindale, The Prosopography of the Later Roman Empire (abbreviated PLRE), Cambridge University Press (1971–1992).
- Guido Bastianini, "Lista dei prefetti d'Egitto dal 30^{a} al 299^{p}" (List of the Prefects of Egypt from 30 BC to AD 299), in Zeitschrift für Papyrologie und Epigraphik, vol. 17 (1975).
- Anthony R. Birley, Septimius Severus: The African Emperor (revised ed.), Yale University Press, New Haven (1988).
