= Timolaus of Palmyra =

Supposed Palmyrene nobleman (3rd century)

- Born: 3rd century
- Died: c. 272
- Parents: Odaenathus (father); Zenobia (mother)

Timolaus of Palmyra (Latin: Timolaus) was reportedly a 3rd century Palmyrene nobleman, son of the king of kings Odaenathus (r. 252-267) and augustus Zenobia (r. 267-272). Little is known about him, and all the existing information comes from speculation. Such is the doubt of his existence that some scholars try to associate him with Vaballathus (r. 267-272), another of the sons of Odaenathus and Zenobia. Some authors believe he is an individual made up by the Historia Augusta, the only historical source that cites him, and some speculate that he is in fact a historical figure. He appears only in 267, at the time of his father's assassination.

== Family ==
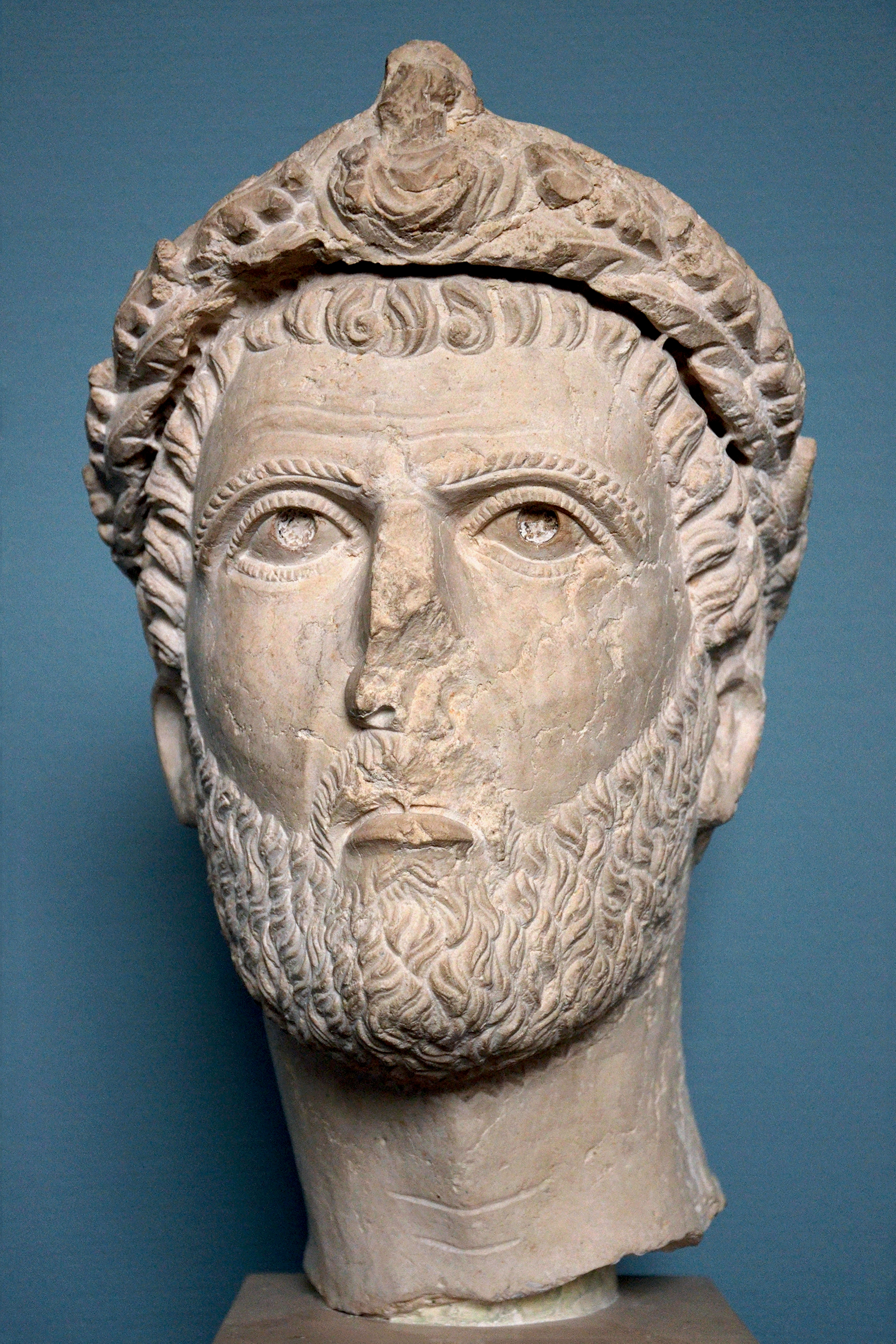
Possible limestone bust of Odaenathus. Ny Carlsberg Glyptotek, Copenhagen

Timolaus was the son of Odaenathus and his second wife Zenobia, grandson of Hairan I, great-grandson of Vaballathus, and great-great-grandson of Nasor. He was the half-brother of Hairan I, the fruit of Odaenathus' relationship with a previous wife. He also had two sisters, whose names are not known. It is known, however, that they married respectively the emperor Aurelian (r. 270-275) and a Roman senator. Timolaus was also the brother of Vaballathus, Hairan II, and Septimius Antiochus. The Historia Augusta (HA) cites him as having another brother, Herodian, whose existence is questioned. Some think Herodian was a variant of Hairan II's name.

== Life ==
There are doubts as to the existence of Timolaus. Some authors suggest that he may be a fabrication, a de facto individual (whose name, recorded here in Latinized form, has the Palmyrene variant Taimallat), or a distortion of the name Vaballathus.

Nothing is known about his life, having been mentioned only in 267, in the context of the murder of Odaenathus and Hairan I. The versions of the events are many, but in one of them, presented by the Historia Augusta (which also cites two other versions), his murderer was Maeonius, a cousin or nephew of Odaenathus, having carried out the crime at the behest of Zenobia. According to the source, Zenobia resented that Hairan II (Herenian) and Timolaus were in a lower position than her godson and therefore orders Maeonius to kill them.

The Historia Augusta mentions that Zenobia assumed the throne on their behalf, dressed them in purple, as emperors, and led them in public meetings which she attended in the likeness of Dido, Semiramis, and Cleopatra. The HA itself indicates that how they died is uncertain and presents two versions: in the first, they were killed by Aurelian at the time of the conquest of the Palmyrene Empire (272); in the second, they died of natural causes, as there were still at the time the work was written (4th century), noble descendants of Zenobia in Rome.

The HA further asserts that such was Timolaus' eagerness for Roman studies that, in a short time, he allegedly fulfilled the declaration of his professor of languages, who said that he was indeed capable of making him the greatest of Latin rhetoricians.

== Bibliography ==
- Southern, Pat (2008). Empress Zenobia Palmyra's Rebel Queen. London, NY: Continuum.
- Watson, Alaric (2004). Aurelian and the Third Century. New York; London: Routledge. ISBN 978-1-134-90815-8.
- Dodgeon, Michael H; Lieu, Samuel N. C. (2002). The Roman Eastern Frontier and the Persian Wars (Part I, 226–363 AD). London: Routledge. ISBN 0-415-00342-3.
