= Zenobia =

Empress of Palmyra in 272

Zenobia 𐡡𐡶𐡦𐡡𐡩
- Augusta
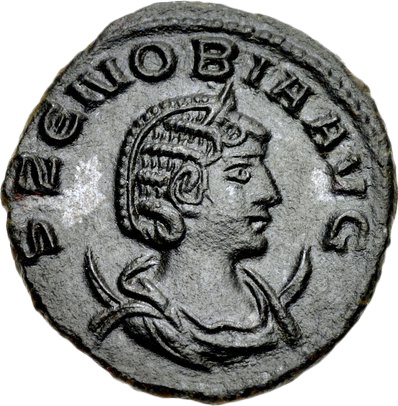
- Zenobia as empress on the obverse of an antoninianus (272 AD)

Empress of Palmyra
- Reign: 272 AD
- Co-monarch: Vaballathus

Queen of Egypt
- Reign: 270–272

Queen mother (regent) of Palmyra
- Regency: 267–272
- Monarch: Vaballathus

Queen consort of Palmyra
- Tenure: 260–267
- Born: Septimia Btzby (Bat-Zabbai) c. 240; Palmyra, Syria
- Died: After 274
- Spouse: Odaenathus
- Issue: Vaballathus; Hairan II; Septimius Antiochus
Names
- Septimia Zenobia (Bat-Zabbai)
Regnal name
- Septimia Zenobia Augusta
- House: House of Odaenathus

Septimia Zenobia (Palmyrene Aramaic: 𐡡𐡶𐡦𐡡𐡩, romanized: Bat-Zabbai; c. 240 – c. 274) was a third-century queen of the Palmyrene Empire in Syria. Many legends surround her ancestry; she was probably not a commoner. She married Odaenathus, who became king of the city of Palmyra in 260, elevating it to supreme power in the Near East by defeating the Sasanian Empire of Persia and stabilizing the Roman East. After Odaenathus' assassination in 267, Zenobia became the regent of her son Vaballathus and held de facto power throughout his reign (267 to 272).

In 270, Zenobia launched an invasion that brought most of the Roman East under her sway and culminated with the annexation of Egypt. By mid-271 her realm extended from Ancyra, central Anatolia, to Upper Egypt, although she remained nominally subordinate to Rome. However, in reaction to the campaign of the Roman emperor Aurelian in 272, Zenobia declared her son emperor and assumed the title of empress, thus declaring Palmyra's independence from Rome. The Romans were victorious after heavy fighting; the empress was besieged in her capital and captured in late 272 by Aurelian, who exiled her to Rome, where she spent the remainder of her life.

Zenobia was a cultured monarch and fostered an intellectual environment in her court, which was open to scholars and philosophers. She was tolerant toward her subjects and protected religious minorities. The empress maintained a stable administration, which governed a multicultural, multiethnic empire. Zenobia died after 274, and many tales have been recorded about her fate. Her rise and fall have inspired historians, artists and novelists, and she is a patriotic symbol in Syria.

== Name, appearance and sources ==
Zenobia was born c. 240–241, and bore the gentilicium (surname) Septimia. (Note: "Septimius" was also Odaenathus' family's gentilicium (surname) adopted as an expression of loyalty to the Roman Severan dynasty, whose emperor Septimius Severus granted the family Roman citizenship in the late second century.) Her native Palmyrene name was Bat-Zabbai (written "Btzby" in the Palmyrene alphabet), an Aramaic name meaning "daughter of Zabbai". Such compound names for women were common in Palmyra, where the element "bt" means daughter, but the personal name that follows does not necessarily denote the immediate father, rather referring to the ancestor of the family. In Greek—Palmyra's diplomatic and second language, used in many Palmyrene inscriptions—she used the name Zenobia. In Palmyra, when written in Greek, names such as Zabeida, Zabdila, Zabbai or Zabda were often transformed into "Zenobios" (masculine) and "Zenobia" (feminine). The element "Zabbai" from Zenobia's native name means "gift of N.N. [god]", (Note: N.N. is a grammatical abbreviation denoting "no name", indicating hypocoristica, where a compound name is abbreviated by dropping its theophoric (deity name) element.) and the name Zenobia translates to "one whose life derives from Zeus". The historian Victor Duruy believed that the queen used the Greek name as a translation of her native name, in deference to her Greek subjects. The philologist Wilhelm Dittenberger argued that the name Bat-Zabbai underwent a detortum (twist), thus resulting in the name Zenobia.

The ninth-century historian al-Tabari, in his highly fictionalized account, wrote that the queen's name was Na'ila al-Zabba'. Manichaean sources, reporting the visit of the apostle Mar Adda to the region during the time of Odaenathus, called Zenobia "Queen Tadi", wife of kysr (caesar). (Note: Mainly texts written in Sogdian from the Turfan Oasis; they were included in the series named Berliner Turfantexte launched in 1971.) The name given to Zenobia in those Manichaean writings seems to derive from Tadmor, Palmyra's native name, and this is supported by the Coptic Acts Codex, in which Zenobia is named Queen Thadmor.

No contemporary statues of Zenobia have been found in Palmyra or elsewhere, with only inscriptions on statues' bases surviving, indicating that a statue of the queen once stood in the place; most known representations of Zenobia are the idealized portraits of her found on her coins. Sculptures of Palmyrene style were normally impersonal, unlike Greek and Roman ones: a statue of Zenobia in this style would have given an idea of her general style in dress and jewelry but would not have revealed her true appearance. The non-contemporary historian Edward Gibbon has described her as being "of a dark complexion" and considered "most lovely," and that she "equalled in beauty her [claimed] ancestor Cleopatra." British scholar William Wright visited Palmyra toward the end of the nineteenth century in a vain search for a sculpture of the queen.

In addition to archaeological evidence, Zenobia's life was recorded in different ancient sources but many are flawed or fabricated; the Historia Augusta, a late-Roman collection of biographies, is the most notable (albeit unreliable) source for the era. The author (or authors) of the Historia Augusta invented many events and letters attributed to Zenobia in the absence of contemporary sources. Some Historia Augusta accounts are corroborated from other sources, and are more credible. The Byzantine chronicler Joannes Zonaras is considered an important source for the life of Zenobia.

== Origin, family and early life ==
Palmyrene society was an amalgam of Semitic-speaking peoples, mostly Arabs and Arameans, and Zenobia cannot be identified with any one group; as a Palmyrene, she may have had both Arab and Aramean ancestry. However, the Palmyrene's never considered themselves Arab, and to call Palmyra "Arab" is a modern device with no contemporary usage. Information about Zenobia's ancestry and immediate family connections is scarce and contradictory. Nothing is known about her mother, and her father's identity is debated. Manichaean sources mention a "Nafsha", sister of the "queen of Palmyra", but those sources are confused and "Nafsha" may refer to Zenobia herself: it is doubtful that Zenobia had a sister.

Apparently not a commoner, Zenobia would have received an education appropriate for a noble Palmyrene girl. The Historia Augusta contains details of her early life, although their veracity is dubious; according to the Historia Augusta, the queen's hobby as a child was hunting and, in addition to her Palmyrene Aramaic mother tongue, she was fluent in Egyptian and Greek and spoke Latin. When she was about fourteen years old (ca. 255), Zenobia became the second wife of Odaenathus, the ras ("lord") of Palmyra. Noble families in Palmyra often intermarried, and it is probable that Zenobia and Odaenathus shared some ancestors.

=== Contemporary epigraphical evidence ===
Basing their suppositions upon archaeological evidence, various historians have suggested several men as Zenobia's father:

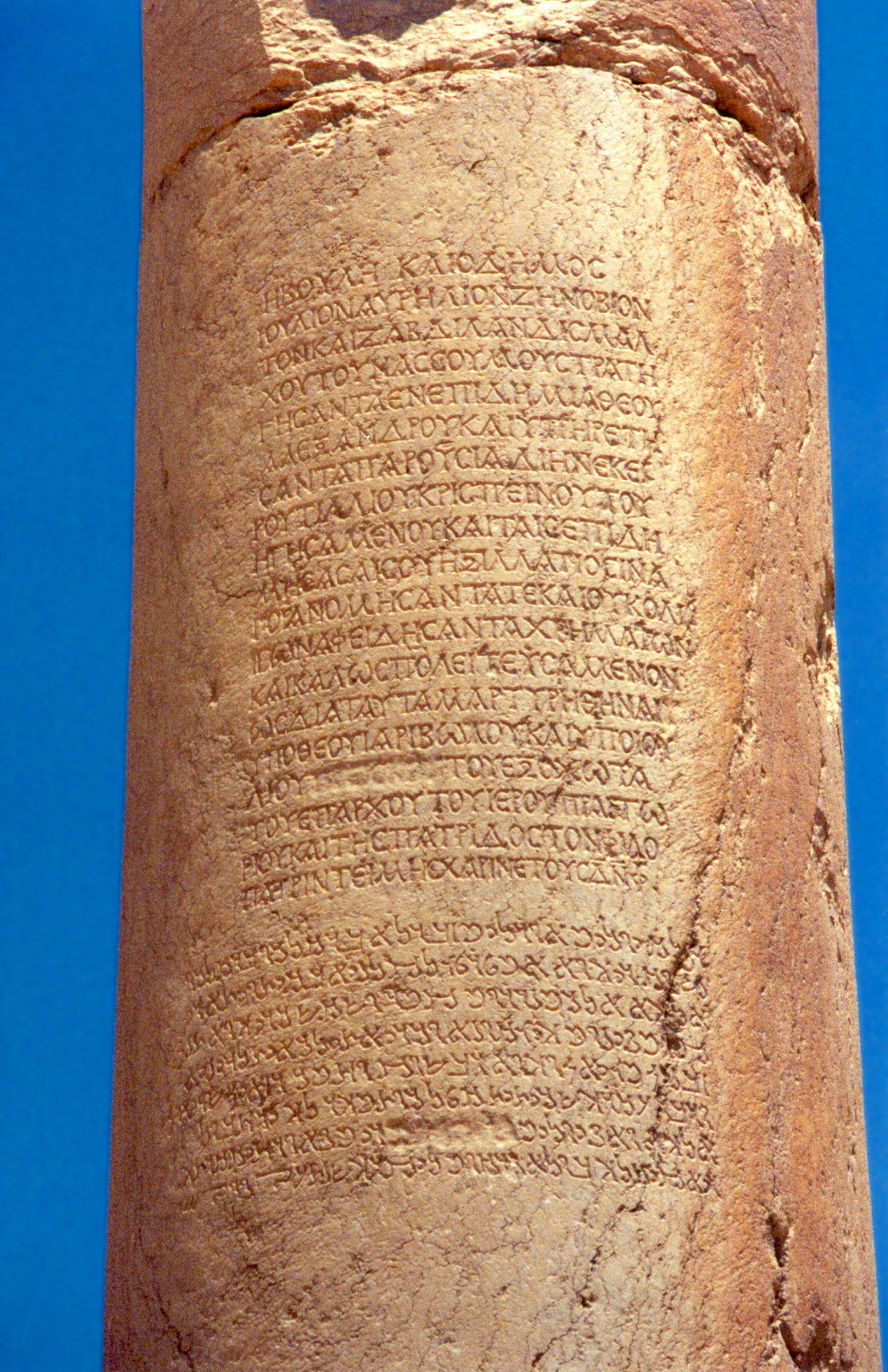
Palmyrene inscription honoring Julius Aurelius Zenobius, believed by some to be Zenobia's father

Julius Aurelius Zenobius appears on a Palmyrene inscription as a strategos of Palmyra in 231–232; based on the similarity of the names, Zenobius was suggested as Zenobia's father by the numismatist Alfred von Sallet and others. The archaeologist William Waddington argued in favor of Zenobius' identification as the father, assuming that his statue stood opposite to where the statue of the queen stood in Great Colonnade. However, the linguist Jean-Baptiste Chabot pointed out that Zenobius' statue stood opposite to that of Odaenathus not Zenobia and rejected Waddington's hypothesis. The only gentilicium, a hereditary name borne by people that was originally the name of one's gens (family or clan) by patrilineal descent, appearing on Zenobia's inscriptions was "Septimia" (not "Julia Aurelia", which she would have borne if her father's gentilicium was Aurelius), and it cannot be proven that the queen changed her gentilicium to Septimia after her marriage. (Note: Both Dittenberger and von Sallet believed that Zenobia bore the gentilicium Julia Aurelia during her marriage and took the gentilicium Septimia after Odaenathus' death; von Sallet argued that the coins minted by Vaballathus in Alexandria bore the initials of the names "Julius", "Aurelius" and "Septimius", before his own name. Therefore, it is apparent that Vaballathus took his maternal family's name beside his paternal one.)

One of Zenobia's inscriptions recorded her as "Septimia Bat-Zabbai, daughter of Antiochus". Antiochus' identity is not definitively known: his ancestry is not recorded in Palmyrene inscriptions, and the name was not common in Palmyra. This, combined with the meaning of Zenobia's Palmyrene name (daughter of Zabbai), led scholars such as Harald Ingholt to speculate that Antiochus might have been a distant ancestor: the Seleucid king Antiochus IV Epiphanes or Antiochus VII Sidetes, whose wife was the Ptolemaic Cleopatra Thea. In the historian Richard Stoneman's view, Zenobia would not have created an obscure ancestry to connect herself with the ancient Macedonian rulers: if a fabricated ancestry were needed, a more direct connection would have been invented. According to Stoneman, Zenobia "had reason to believe [her Seleucid ancestry] to be true". The historian Patricia Southern, noting that Antiochus was mentioned without a royal title or a hint of great lineage, believes that he was a direct ancestor or a relative rather than a Seleucid king who lived three centuries before Zenobia.

On the basis of Zenobia's Palmyrene name, Bat Zabbai, her father may have been called Zabbai; alternatively, Zabbai may have been the name of a more distant ancestor. The historian Trevor Bryce suggests that she was related to Septimius Zabbai, Palmyra's garrison leader, and he may even have been her father. The archaeologist Charles Simon Clermont-Ganneau, attempting to reconcile the meaning of the name "Bat Zabbai" with the inscription mentioning the queen as daughter of Antiochus, suggested that two brothers, Zabbai and Antiochus, existed, with a childless Zabbai dying and leaving his widow to marry his brother Antiochus. Thus, since Zenobia was born out of a levirate marriage, she was theoretically the daughter of Zabbai, hence the name.

=== Ancient sources ===
In the Historia Augusta, Zenobia is said to have been a descendant of Cleopatra and claimed descent from the Ptolemies. (Note: The writer of the Historia Augusta might have based his account on the work of Ammianus Marcellinus, who wrote about the habits of men in "vaulted baths" and how they extol women "with such disgraceful flattery as the Parthians do Semiramis, the Egyptians their Cleopatras, the Carians [do] Artemisia, or the people of Palmyra [do] Zenobia". If the Historia Augusta writer did indeed use the words of Ammianus, then the remark about Zenobia's supposed descent loses its merit.) According to the Souda, a tenth-century Byzantine encyclopedia, after the Palmyrene conquest of Egypt, the sophist Callinicus of Petra wrote a ten-volume history of Alexandria dedicated to Cleopatra. According to modern scholars, by Cleopatra Callinicus meant Zenobia. (Note: The conclusion that Callinicus meant Zenobia is based on the fact that the work was written following Palmyra's invasion of Egypt, combined with what is known about Zenobia's alleged claims of descent from Cleopatra. The first scholar to suggest that, by Cleopatra, Callinicus meant Zenobia was Aurel Stein in 1923, and his view was accepted by many other historians.) Apart from legends, there is no direct evidence in Egyptian coinage or papyri of a contemporary conflation of Zenobia with Cleopatra. The connection may have been invented by Zenobia's enemies to discredit her, (Note: The Roman view of Cleopatra was negative; she was portrayed as a traitorous manipulative woman who used her beauty and sex to achieve her goals.) but circumstantial evidence indicates that Zenobia herself made the claim; an imperial declaration once ascribed to Emperor Severus Alexander (died 235) was probably made by Zenobia in the name of her son Vaballathus, where the king named Alexandria "my ancestral city", which indicates a claim to Ptolemaic ancestry. Zenobia's alleged claim of a connection to Cleopatra seems to have been politically motivated, since it would have given her a connection with Egypt and made her a legitimate successor to the Ptolemies' throne. A relationship between Zenobia and the Ptolemies is unlikely, and attempts by classical sources to trace the queen's ancestry to the Ptolemies through the Seleucids are apocryphal.

==== Arab traditions and al-Zabba' ====
Although some Arab historians linked Zenobia to the Queen of Sheba, their accounts are apocryphal. Medieval Arabic traditions identify a queen of Palmyra named al-Zabba', and her most romantic account comes from al-Tabari. According to al-Tabari, she was an Amalekite; her father was 'Amr ibn Zarib, an 'Amālīq sheikh who was killed by the Tanukhids. Al-Tabari identifies a sister of al-Zabba' as "Zabibah". Jadhimah ibn Malik, the Tanukhid king who killed the queen's father, was killed by al-Zabba'. According to al-Tabari, al-Zabba' had a fortress along the Euphrates and ruled Palmyra.

Al-Tabari's account does not mention the Romans, Odaenathus, Vaballathus or the Sassanians; focusing on the tribes and their relations, it is immersed in legends. Although the account is certainly based on the story of Zenobia, it is probably conflated with the story of a semi-legendary nomadic Arab queen (or queens). Al-Zabba''s fortress was probably Halabiye, which was restored by the historic Palmyrene queen and named Zenobia.

== Queen of Palmyra ==
=== Consort ===
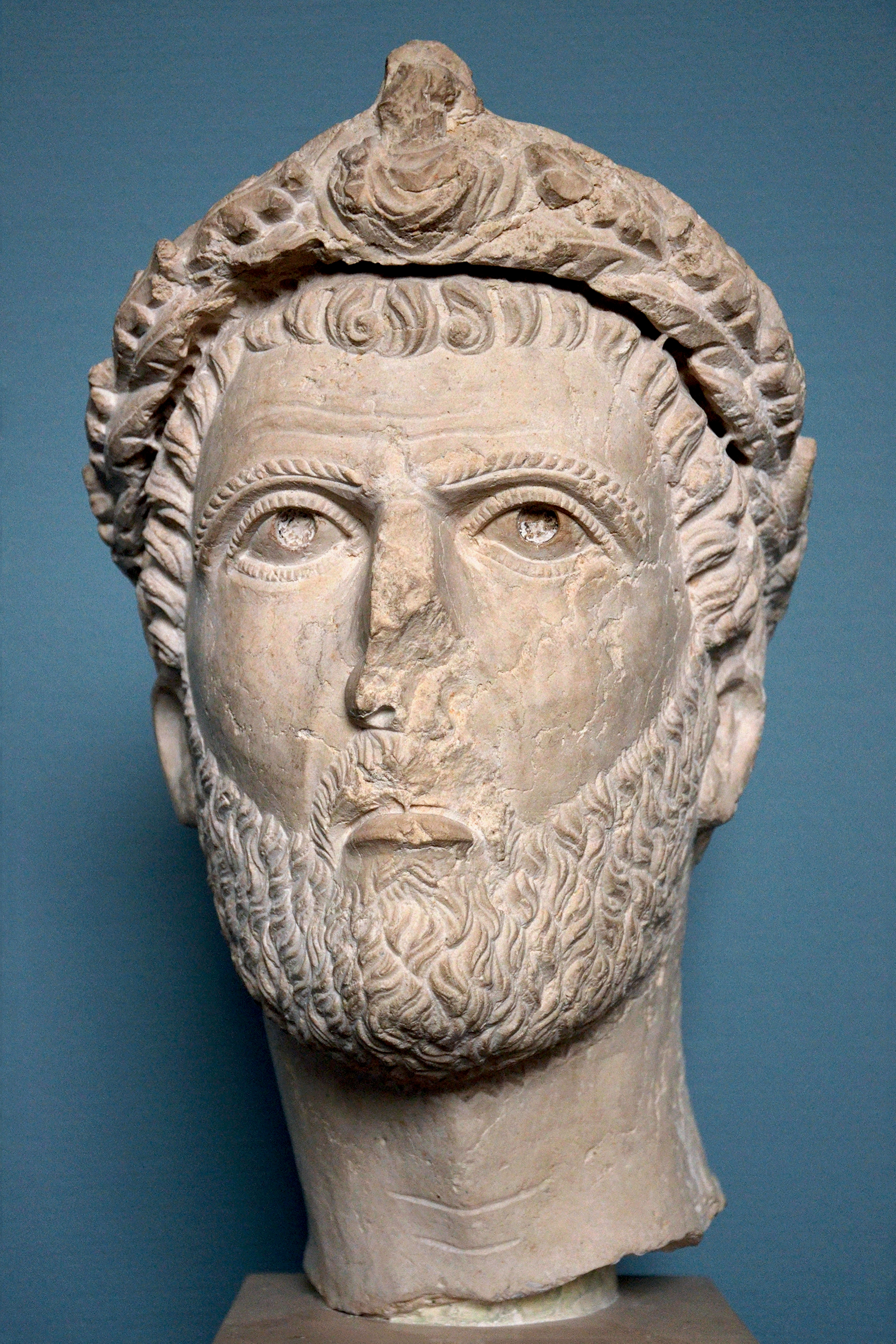
Mid-third-century bust of a Palmyrene leader, possibly Odaenathus.

During the early centuries AD, Palmyra was a city subordinate to Rome and part of the province of Syria Phoenice. In 260 the Roman emperor Valerian marched against the Sassanid Persian monarch Shapur I, who had invaded the empire's eastern regions; Valerian was defeated and captured near Edessa. Odaenathus, formally loyal to Rome and its emperor Gallienus (Valerian's son), was declared king of Palmyra. Launching successful campaigns against Persia, he was crowned King of Kings of the East in 263. Odaenathus crowned his eldest son, Herodianus, as co-ruler. In addition to the royal titles, Odaenathus received many Roman titles, most importantly corrector totius orientis (governor of the entire East), and ruled the Roman territories from the Black Sea to Palestine. In 267, when Zenobia was in her late twenties or early thirties, Odaenathus and his eldest son were assassinated while returning from a campaign.

The first inscription mentioning Zenobia as queen is dated two or three years after Odaenathus' death, so exactly when Zenobia assumed the title "queen of Palmyra" is uncertain. However, she was probably designated as queen when her husband became king. As queen consort, Zenobia remained in the background and was not mentioned in the historical record. According to later accounts, including one by Giovanni Boccaccio, she accompanied her husband on his campaigns. If the accounts of her accompanying her husband are true, according to Southern, Zenobia would have boosted the morale of the soldiers and gained political influence, which she needed in her later career.

==== Possible role in Odaenathus' assassination ====
According to the Historia Augusta, Odaenathus was assassinated by a cousin named Maeonius. In the Historia Augusta, Odaenathus' son from his first wife was named Herodes and was crowned co-ruler by his father. The Historia Augusta claims that Zenobia conspired with Maeonius for a time because she did not accept her stepson as his father's heir (ahead of her own children). The Historia Augusta does not suggest that Zenobia was involved in the events leading to her husband's murder, and the crime is attributed to Maeonius' moral degeneration and jealousy. This account, according to the historian Alaric Watson, can be dismissed as fictional. Although some modern scholarship suggests that Zenobia was involved in the assassination due to political ambition and opposition to her husband's pro-Roman policy, she continued Odaenathus' policies during her first years on the throne.

=== Regent ===
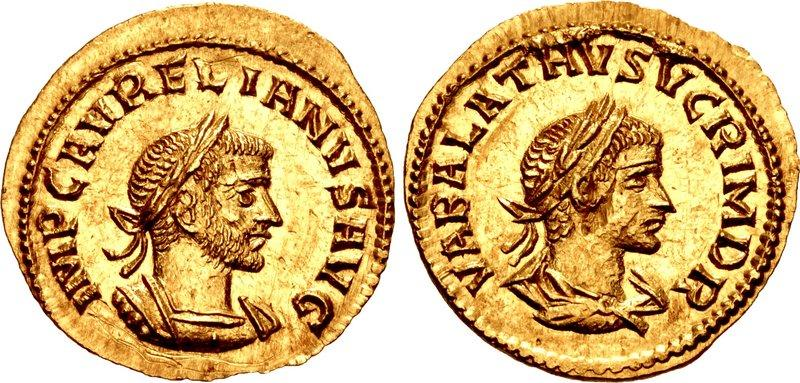
Palmyrene Aureus minted in Antioch in AD 271, showing Aurelian (left) as emperor and Vaballathus as king.

In the Historia Augusta , Maeonius was emperor briefly before he was killed by his soldiers, however, no inscriptions or evidence exist for his reign. At the time of Odaenathus' assassination, Zenobia might have been with her husband; according to chronicler George Syncellus, he was killed near Heraclea Pontica in Bithynia. The transfer of power seems to have been smooth, since Syncellus reports that the time from the assassination to the army handing the crown to Zenobia was one day. Zenobia may have been in Palmyra, but this would have reduced the likelihood of a smooth transition; the soldiers might have chosen one of their officers, so the first scenario of her being with her husband is more likely. The historical records are unanimous that Zenobia did not fight for supremacy and there is no evidence of delay in the transfer of the throne to Odaenathus and Zenobia's son, the ten-year-old Vaballathus. Although she never claimed to rule in her own right and acted as a regent for her son, Zenobia held the reins of power in the kingdom, and Vaballathus was kept in his mother's shadow, never exercising real power.

==== Consolidation of power ====
The Palmyrene monarchy was new; allegiance was based on loyalty to Odaenathus, making the transfer of power to a successor more difficult than it would have been in an established monarchy. Odaenathus tried to ensure the dynasty's future by crowning his eldest son co-king, but both were assassinated. Zenobia, left to secure the Palmyrene succession and retain the loyalty of its subjects, emphasized the continuity between her late husband and his successor (her son). Vaballathus (with Zenobia orchestrating the process) assumed his father's royal titles immediately, and his earliest known inscription records him as King of Kings.

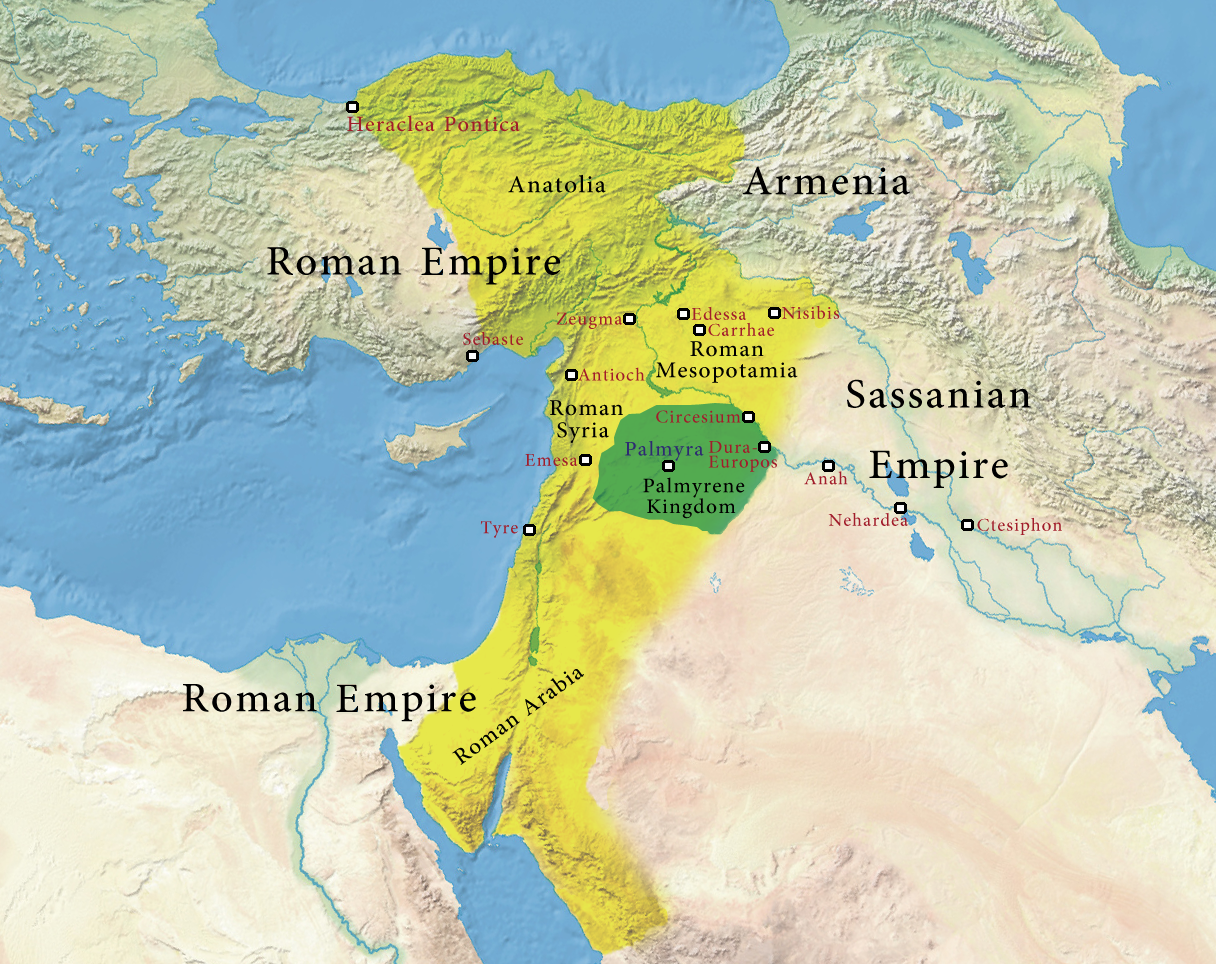
Roman regions under Odaenathus (yellow) and the Palmyrene kingdom (green)

Odaenathus controlled a large area of the Roman East, (Note: The Roman East traditionally included all the Roman lands in Asia east of the Bosphorus.) and held the highest political and military authority in the region, superseding that of the Roman provincial governors. His self-created status was formalized by Emperor Gallienus, who had little choice but to acquiesce. Odaenathus's power relative to that of the emperor and the central authority was unprecedented and elastic, but relations remained smooth until his death. His assassination meant that the Palmyrene rulers' authority and position had to be clarified, which led to a conflict over their interpretation. The Roman court viewed Odaenathus as an appointed Roman official who derived his power from the emperor, but the Palmyrene court saw his position as hereditary. This conflict was the first step on the road to war between Rome and Palmyra.

Odaenathus' Roman titles, such as dux Romanorum, corrector totius orientis and imperator totius orientis differed from his royal eastern ones because the Roman ranks were not hereditary. Vaballathus had a legitimate claim to his royal titles, but had no right to the Roman ones—especially corrector (denoting a senior military and provincial commander in the Roman system), which Zenobia used for her son in his earliest known inscriptions with "King of Kings". Although the Roman emperors accepted the royal succession, the assumption of Roman military rank antagonized the empire. Emperor Gallienus may have decided to intervene in an attempt to regain central authority; according to the Historia Augusta, praetorian prefect Aurelius Heraclianus was dispatched to assert imperial authority over the east and was repelled by the Palmyrene army. The account is doubtful, however, since Heraclianus participated in Gallienus' assassination in 268. Odaenathus was assassinated shortly before the emperor, and Heraclianus would have been unable to be sent to the East, fight the Palmyrenes and return to the West in time to become involved in the conspiracy against the emperor. (Note: A plausible scenario, according to the historian David Potter, would be that a campaign was sent in 270 by Claudius Gothicus, Gallienus' successor.)

==== Early reign ====
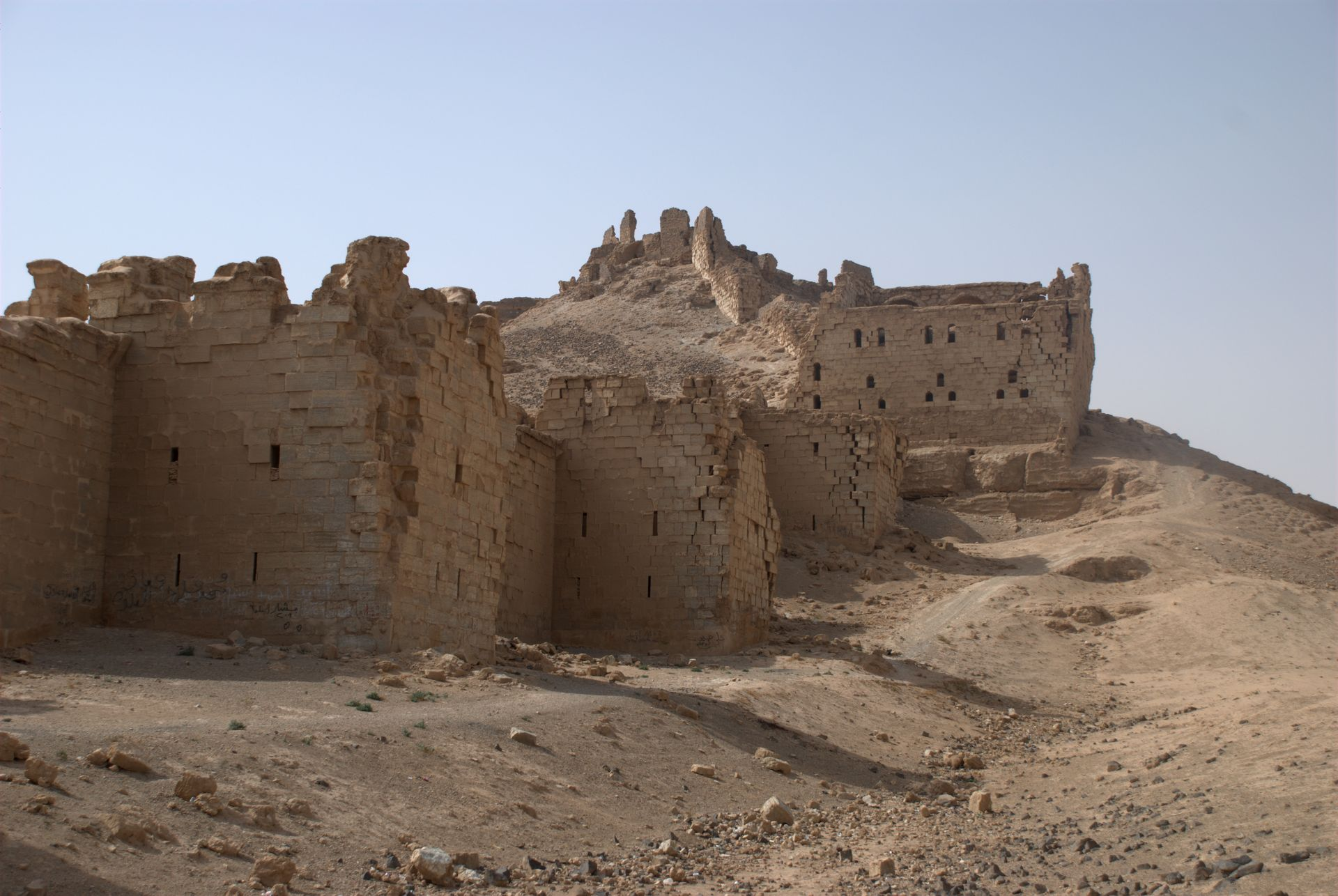
The citadel of Halabiye, renamed "Zenobia" after its renovation by the queen

The extent of Zenobia's territorial control during her early reign is debated; according to the historian Fergus Millar, her authority was confined to Palmyra and Emesa until 270. (Note: An often-cited argument for limited territorial control is that the Antiochean Mint did not issue coins in the name of the queen or her son before 270. However, in the opinion of Southern, this can be explained by the existence of Claudius Gothicus on the imperial throne, which made it unnecessary for the queen to issue coins in the name of her son. After Claudius' death in 270, the imperial throne was contested by his brother Quintillus and the army candidate Aurelian, but the Antiochean mint, probably under orders from Zenobia (who apparently did not recognize Quintillus) did not issue coins for both pretenders. When Aurelian prevailed, Zenobia might have found it an opportunity to declare for him; the new coins bore the picture of Aurelian but also, for the first time, Vaballathus.) If this was the case, the events of 270 (which saw Zenobia's conquest of the Levant and Egypt) are extraordinary. It is more likely that the queen ruled the territories controlled by her late husband, a view supported by Southern and the historian Udo Hartmann, and backed by ancient sources (such as the Roman historian Eutropius, who wrote that the queen inherited her husband's power). The Historia Augusta also mentioned that Zenobia took control of the East during Gallienus' reign. Further evidence of extended territorial control was a statement by the Byzantine historian Zosimus, who wrote that the queen had a residence in Antioch. (Note: The palace was probably established by Odaenathus who crowned his son in Antioch, Syria's historical capital.)

There is no recorded unrest against the queen accompanying her ascendance in ancient sources hostile to her, indicating no serious opposition to the new regime. (Note: According to the Historia Augusta the emperor Aurelian sent a letter to the Senate saying that the Egyptians, Armenians and Arabs were so afraid of Zenobia that they did not dare revolt; however, the author does not say that the Syrians were afraid of the queen.) The most obvious candidates for opposition were the Roman provincial governors, but the sources do not say that Zenobia marched on any of them or that they tried to remove her from the throne. According to Hartmann, the governors and military leaders of the eastern provinces apparently acknowledged and supported Vaballathus as the successor of Odaenathus. During Zenobia's early regency, she focused on safeguarding the borders with Persia and pacifying the Tanukhids in Hauran. To protect the Persian borders, the queen fortified many settlements on the Euphrates (including the citadels of Halabiye—later called Zenobia—and Zalabiye). Circumstantial evidence exists for confrontations with the Sassanid Persians; probably in 269, Vaballathus assumed the victory title of Persicus Maximus (the great victor in Persia); this may be connected to an unrecorded battle against a Persian army trying to control northern Mesopotamia. (Note: Ancient sources accused Zenobia of sympathizing with the Persians, claiming that she was worshiped like the Persian leaders and drank wine with their generals; however, the accusations are unfounded since Zenobia fortified the frontier with Persia.)

==== Expansion ====
In 269, while Claudius Gothicus (Gallienus' successor) was defending the borders of Italy and the Balkans against Germanic invasions, Zenobia was cementing her authority; Roman officials in the East were caught between loyalty to the emperor and Zenobia's increasing demands for allegiance. The timing and rationale of the queen's decision to use military force to strengthen her authority in the East is unclear; scholar Gary K. Young suggested that Roman officials refused to recognize Palmyrene authority, and Zenobia's expeditions were intended to maintain Palmyrene dominance. Another factor may have been the weakness of Roman central authority and its corresponding inability to protect the provinces, which probably convinced Zenobia that the only way to maintain stability in the East was to control the region directly. The historian Jacques Schwartz tied Zenobia's actions to her desire to protect Palmyra's economic interests, which were threatened by Rome's failure to protect the provinces. Also, according to Schwartz, the economic interests conflicted; Bostra and Egypt received trade which would have otherwise passed through Palmyra. The Tanukhids near Bostra and the merchants of Alexandria probably attempted to rid themselves of Palmyrene domination, triggering a military response from Zenobia.

===== Syria and the invasion of Arabia Petraea =====
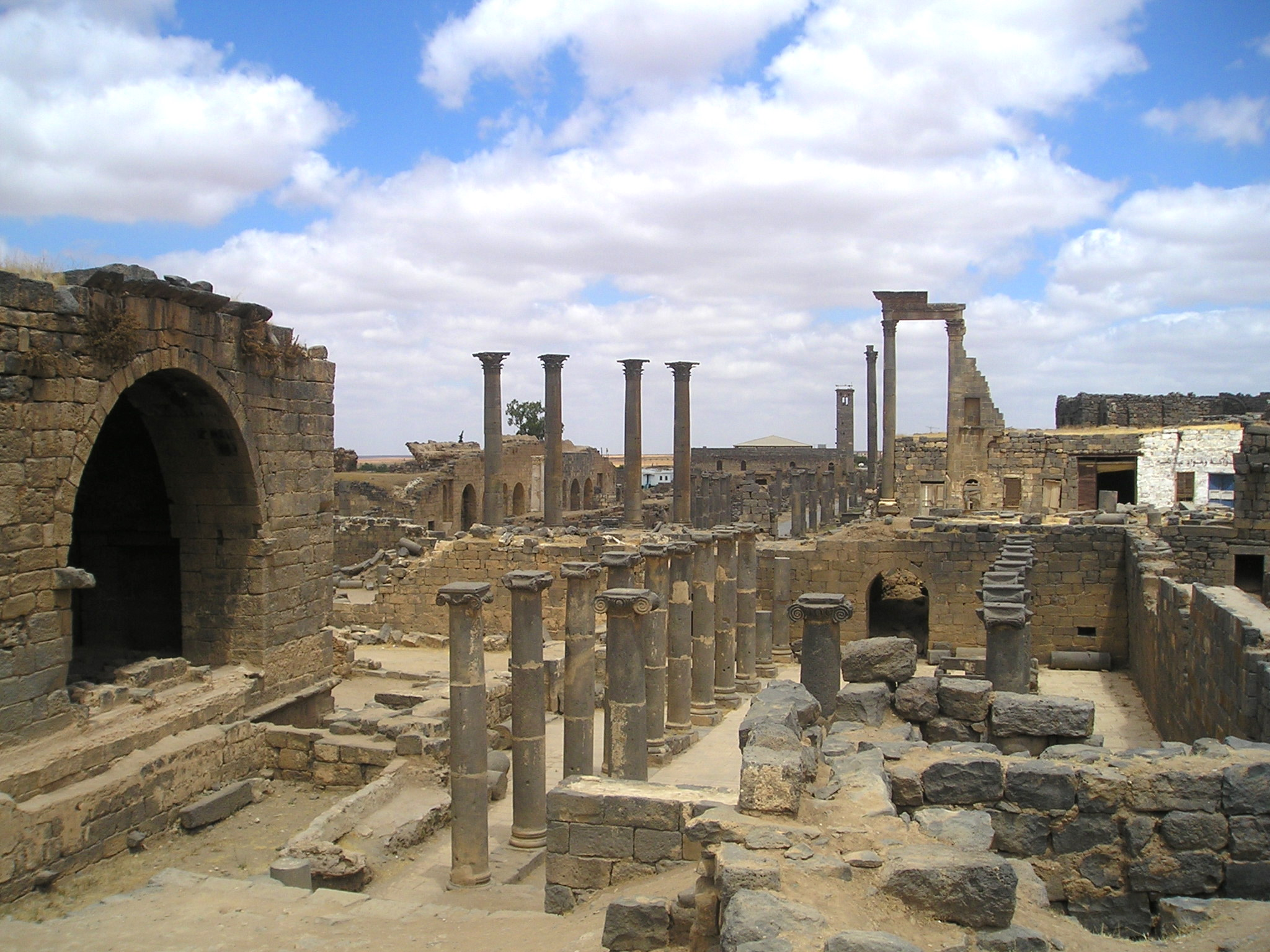
Bostra, sacked by Palmyra in 270

In the spring of 270, while Claudius was fighting the Goths in the mountains of Thrace, Zenobia sent her general Septimius Zabdas to Bosra (capital of the province of Arabia Petraea); the queen's timing seems intentional. In Arabia the Roman governor (dux), Trassus (commanding the Legio III Cyrenaica), (Note: Although his name is only mentioned by John Malalas, archaeological evidence supports the Arabian campaign.) confronted the Palmyrenes and was routed and killed. Zabdas sacked the city, and destroyed the temple of Zeus Hammon, the legion's revered shrine. A Latin inscription after the fall of Zenobia attests to its destruction: "The temple of Iuppiter Hammon, destroyed by the Palmyrene enemies, which ... rebuilt, with a silver statue and iron doors (?)". The city of Umm el-Jimal may have also been destroyed by the Palmyrenes in connection with their efforts to subjugate the Tanukhids.

After his victory, Zabdas marched south along the Jordan Valley and apparently met little opposition. There is evidence that Petra was attacked by a small contingent which penetrated the region. Arabia and Judaea were eventually subdued. Palmyrene dominance of Arabia is confirmed by many milestones bearing Vaballathus' name. Syrian subjugation required less effort because Zenobia had substantial support there, particularly in Antioch, Syria's traditional capital. The invasion of Arabia coincided with the cessation of coin production in Claudius' name by the Antiochean mint, indicating that Zenobia had begun tightening her grip on Syria. By November 270, the mint began issuing coinage in Vaballathus' name.

The Arabian milestones presented the Palmyrene king as a Roman governor and commander, referring to him as vir clarissimus rex consul imperator dux Romanorum. The assumption of such titles was probably meant to legitimize Zenobia's control of the province, not yet a usurpation of the imperial title. Until now, Zenobia could say that she was acting as a representative of the emperor (who was securing the eastern lands of the empire) while the Roman monarch was preoccupied with struggles in Europe. Although Vaballathus' use of the titles amounted to a claim to the imperial throne, Zenobia could still justify them and maintain a mask of subordination to Rome; an "imperator" was a commander of troops, not the equal of an emperor ("imperator caesar augustus").

===== Annexation of Egypt and the campaigns in Asia Minor =====
The invasion of Egypt is sometimes explained by Zenobia's desire to secure an alternative trade route to the Euphrates, which was cut because of the war with Persia. This theory ignores the fact that the Euphrates route was only partially disrupted, and overlooks Zenobia's ambition. The date of the campaign is uncertain; Zosimus placed it after the Battle of Naissus and before Claudius' death, which sets it in the summer of 270. Watson, emphasizing the works of Zonaras and Syncellus and dismissing Zosimus' account, places the invasion in October 270 (after Claudius' death). According to Watson, the occupation of Egypt was an opportunistic move by Zenobia (who was encouraged by the news of Claudius' death in August). Zenobia was declared Queen of Egypt after Palmyrene invasion of Egypt. The image of Selene on the reverse of the coins of Zenobia minted in Alexandria symbolized Zenobia's claim as a descendant and inheritor of Cleopatra VII to legitimize her rule. The appearance of the Palmyrenes on Egypt's eastern frontier would have contributed to unrest in the province, whose society was fractured; Zenobia had supporters and opponents among local Egyptians.

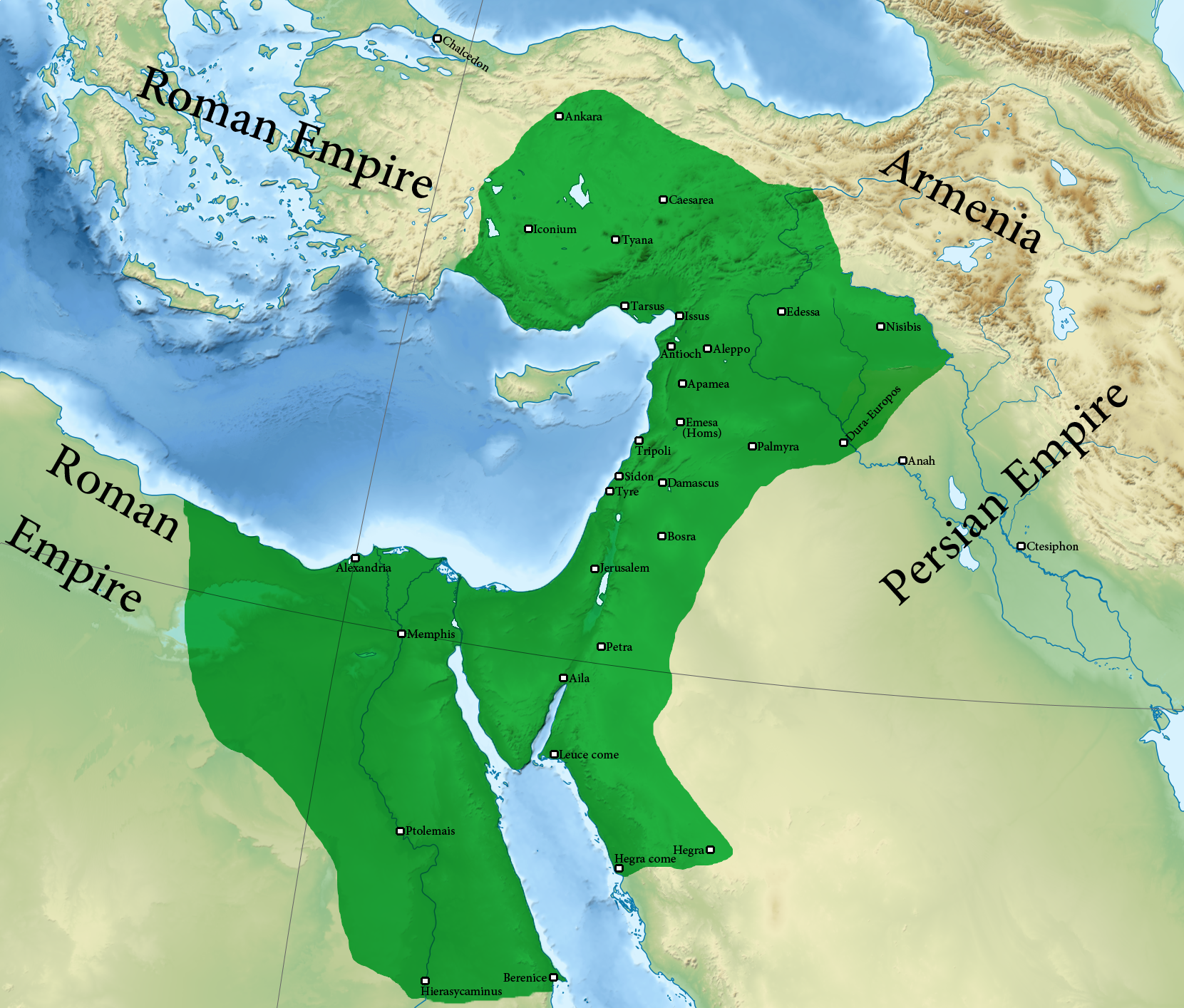
Palmyra at its zenith in 271

The Roman position was worsened by the absence of Egypt's prefect, Tenagino Probus, who was battling pirates. According to Zosimus, the Palmyrenes were helped by an Egyptian general named Timagenes; Zabdas moved into Egypt with 70,000 soldiers, defeating an army of 50,000 Romans. After their victory, the Palmyrenes withdrew their main force and left a 5,000-soldier garrison. By early November, Tenagino Probus returned and assembled an army; he expelled the Palmyrenes and regained Alexandria, prompting Zabdas to return. The Palmyrene general aimed a thrust at Alexandria, where he seems to have had local support; the city fell into Zabdas' hands, and the Roman prefect fled south. The last battle was at the Babylon Fortress, where Tenagino Probus took refuge; the Romans had the upper hand, since they chose their camp carefully. Timagenes, with his knowledge of the land, ambushed the Roman rear; Tenagino Probus committed suicide, and Egypt became part of Palmyra. In the Historia Augusta the Blemmyes were among Zenobia's allies, and Gary K. Young cites the Blemmyes attack and occupation of Coptos in 268 as evidence of a Palmyrene-Blemmyes alliance.

Only Zosimus mentioned two invasions, contrasting with many scholars who argue in favor of an initial invasion and no retreat (followed by a reinforcement, which took Alexandria by the end of 270). During the Egyptian campaign, Rome was entangled in a succession crisis between Claudius' brother Quintillus and the general Aurelian. Egyptian papyri and coinage confirm Palmyrene rule in Egypt; the papyri stopped using the regnal years of the emperors from September to November 270, due to the succession crisis. By December regnal dating was resumed, with the papyri using the regnal years of the prevailing emperor Aurelian and Zenobia's son Vaballathus. Egyptian coinage was issued in the names of Aurelian and the Palmyrene king by November 270. There is no evidence that Zenobia ever visited Egypt.

Although the operation may have commenced under Septimius Zabbai, Zabdas' second-in-command, the invasion of Asia Minor did not fully begin until Zabdas' arrival in the spring of 271. The Palmyrenes annexed Galatia and, according to Zosimus, reached Ancyra. Bithynia and the Cyzicus mint remained beyond Zenobia's control, and her attempts to subdue Chalcedon failed. The Asia Minor campaign is poorly documented, but the western part of the region did not become part of the queen's authority; no coins with Zenobia or Vaballathus' portraits were minted in Asia Minor, and no royal Palmyrene inscriptions have been found. By August 271 Zabdas was back in Palmyra, with the Palmyrene Empire at its zenith.

==== Governance ====
Zenobia ruled an empire of different peoples; as a Palmyrene, she was accustomed to dealing with multilingual and multicultural diversity since she hailed from a city which embraced many cults. The queen's realm was culturally divided into eastern-Semitic and Hellenistic zones; Zenobia tried to appease both, and seems to have successfully appealed to the region's ethnic, cultural and political groups. The queen projected an image of a Syrian monarch, a Hellenistic queen and a Roman empress, which gained broad support for her cause.

===== Culture =====
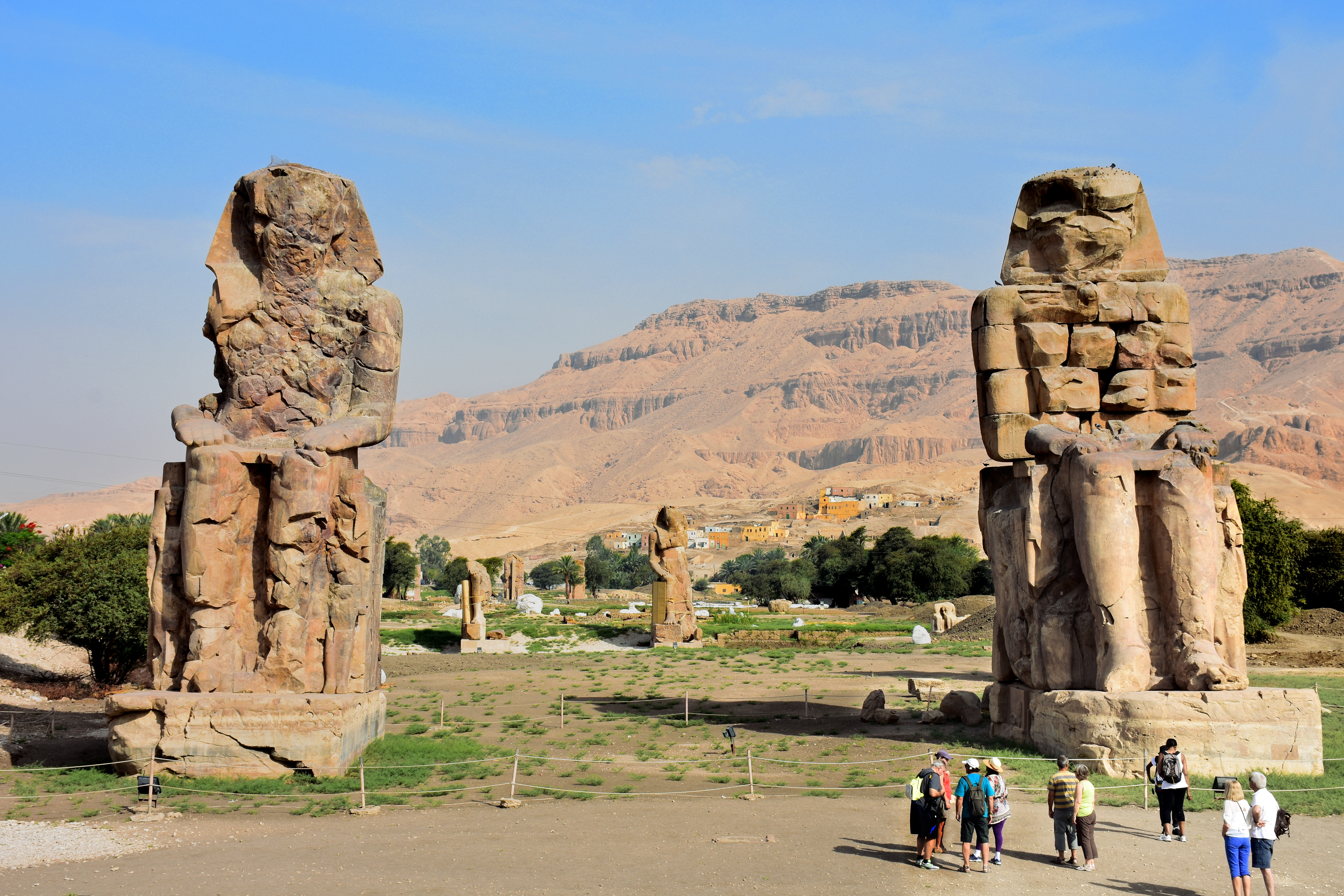
The right colossus of Memnon was probably restored by Zenobia.

Zenobia turned her court into a center of learning, with many intellectuals and sophists reported in Palmyra during her reign. As academics migrated to the city, it replaced classical learning centers such as Athens for Syrians. The best-known court philosopher was Longinus, who arrived during Odaenathus' reign and became Zenobia's tutor in paideia (aristocratic education). Many historians, including Zosimus, accused Longinus of influencing the queen to oppose Rome. This view presents the queen as malleable, but, according to Southern, Zenobia's actions "cannot be laid entirely at Longinus' door". Other intellectuals associated with the court included Nicostratus of Trapezus and Callinicus of Petra.

From the second to the fourth centuries, Syrian intellectuals argued that Greek culture did not evolve in Greece but was adapted from the Near East. According to Iamblichus, the great Greek philosophers reused Near Eastern and Egyptian ideas. The Palmyrene court was probably dominated by this school of thought, with an intellectual narrative presenting Palmyra's dynasty as a Roman imperial one succeeding the Persian, Seleucid and Ptolemaic rulers who controlled the region in which Hellenistic culture allegedly originated. Nicostratus wrote a history of the Roman Empire from Philip the Arab to Odaenathus, presenting the latter as a legitimate imperial successor and contrasting his successes with the disastrous reigns of the emperors.

Zenobia embarked on several restoration projects in Egypt. One of the Colossi of Memnon was reputed in antiquity to sing; the sound was probably due to cracks in the statue, with solar rays interacting with dew in the cracks. The historian Glen Bowersock proposed that the queen restored the colossus ("silencing" it), which would explain third-century accounts of the singing and their disappearance in the fourth.

===== Religion =====
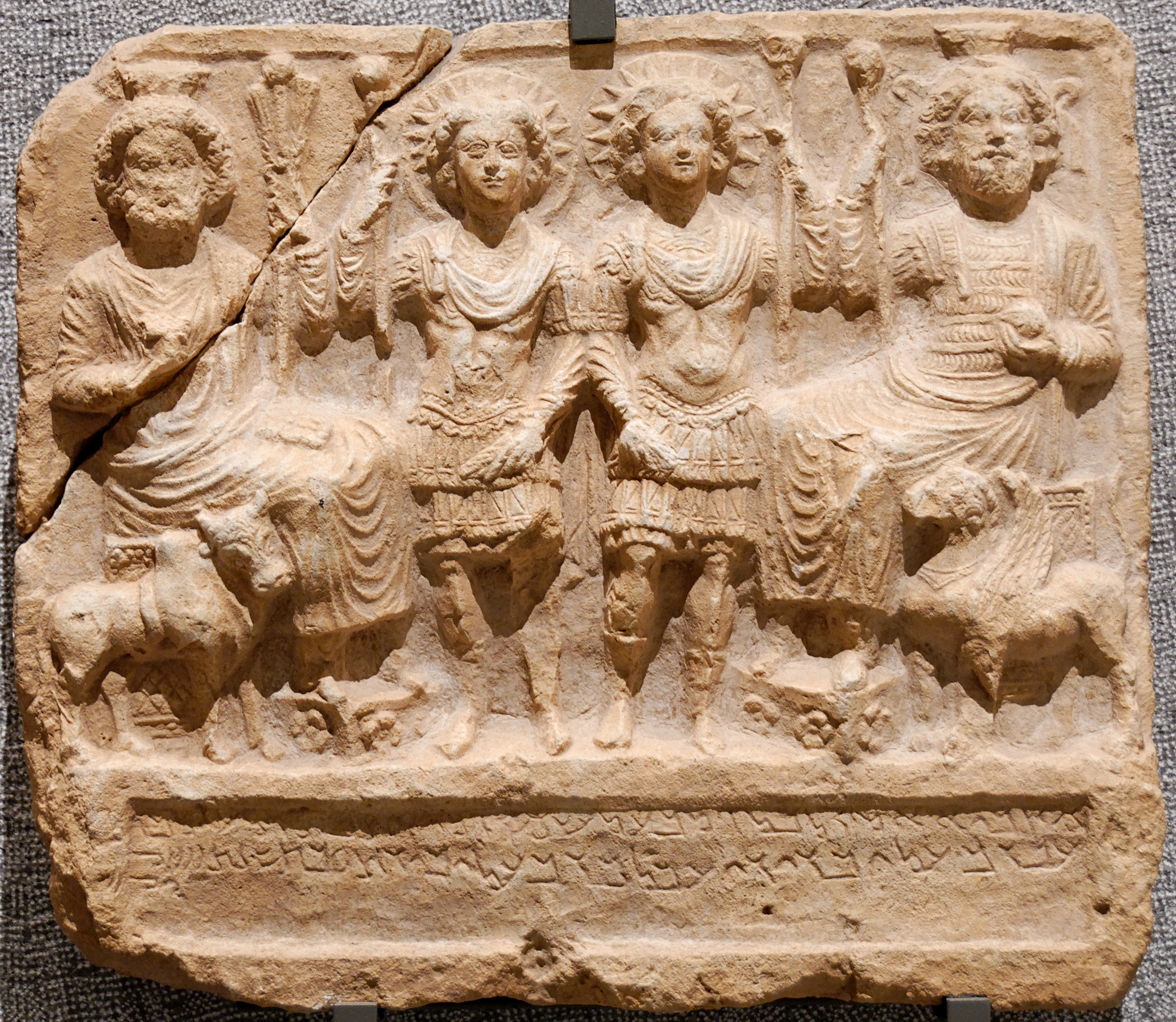
Palmyra's most important deities: (right to left) Bel, Yarhibol, Aglibol and Baalshamin

Zenobia followed the Palmyrene paganism, where a number of Semitic gods, with Bel at the head of the pantheon, were worshipped. Zenobia accommodated Christians and Jews, and ancient sources made many claims about the queen's beliefs; Manichaean sources alleged that Zenobia was one of their own; a manuscript dated to 272 mentions that the Queen of Palmyra supported the Manichaeans in establishing a community in Abidar, which was under the rule of a king named Amarō, who could be the Lakhmid king Amr ibn Adi. It is more likely, however, that Zenobia tolerated all cults in an effort to attract support from groups marginalized by Rome.

Bishop Athanasius of Alexandria wrote that Zenobia did not "hand over churches to the Jews to make them into synagogues"; although the queen was not a Christian, she understood the power of bishops in Christian communities. In Antioch—considered representative of political control of the East and containing a large Christian community—Zenobia apparently maintained authority over the church by bringing influential clerics, probably including Paul of Samosata, under her auspices. She may have bestowed on Paul the rank of ducenarius (minor judge); he apparently enjoyed the queen's protection, which helped him keep the diocesan church after he was removed from his office as bishop of Antioch by a synod of bishops in 268. Hughes suggested that Paul's position while Zenobia ruled was in the state treasury. (Note: Paul of Samosata is considered a heretic by mainstream Christianity, accused of denying the preexistence of Christ. The earliest reference to the relationship between Zenobia and Paul of Samosata comes from Athanasius of Alexandria's fourth-century History of the Arians. According to Eusebius, Paul preferred to be called "ducenarius" instead of bishop; There is evidence that he held this rank in the service of Zenobia. There is no evidence that Paul was invited to the Palmyrene court, and his relationship with Zenobia was exaggerated by later sources. The queen may have supported him as bishop to promote religious tolerance.)

====== Judaism ======
Less than a hundred years after Zenobia's reign, Athanasius of Alexandria called her a "Jewess" in his History of the Arians. In 391, archbishop John Chrysostom wrote that Zenobia was Jewish; so did a Syriac chronicler around 664 and bishop Bar Hebraeus in the thirteenth century. According to French scholar Javier Teixidor, Zenobia was probably a proselyte; this explained her strained relationship with the rabbis. Teixidor believed that Zenobia became interested in Judaism when Longinus spoke about the philosopher Porphyry and his interest in the Old Testament. Although Talmudic sources were hostile to Palmyra because of Odaenathus' suppression of the Jews of Nehardea, Zenobia apparently had the support of some Jewish communities (particularly in Alexandria). In Cairo, a plaque originally bearing an inscription confirming a grant of immunity to a Jewish synagogue in the last quarter of the first millennium BC by King Ptolemy Euergetes (I or II) was found. At a much later date, the plaque was re-inscribed to commemorate the restoration of immunity "on the orders of the queen and king" and the precedence of the queen in the ordering of the two titles is remarkable. Although it is undated, the letters of the inscription date to long after Cleopatra and Anthony's era; Zenobia and her nominal co-monarch Vaballathus, who controlled Egypt in 270–272, are the only candidates for a king and a queen ruling Egypt after the Ptolemies.

The historian E. Mary Smallwood wrote that good relations with the diaspora community did not mean that the Jews of Palestine were content with Zenobia's reign, and her rule was apparently opposed in that region. The Jerusalem Talmud, in Tractate Terumot tells the story of the amoraim Rabbi "Ammi" and Rabbi "Samuel bar Nahmani", who visited Zenobia's court and asked for the release of a Jew ("Zeir bar Hinena") detained on her orders. The queen refused, saying: "Why have you come to save him? He teaches that your creator performs miracles for you. Why not let God save him?" During Aurelian's destruction of Palmyra, Palestinian conscripts with "clubs and cudgels" (who may have been Jews) played a vital role in Zenobia's defeat and the destruction of her city.

There is no evidence of Zenobia's birth as a Jew; the names of her and her husband's families belonged to the Aramaic onomasticon (collection of names). The queen's alleged patronage of Paul of Samosata (who was accused of "Judaizing"), may have given rise to the idea that she was a proselyte. Only Christian accounts note Zenobia's Jewishness; no Jewish source mentions it.

===== Administration =====
The queen probably spent most of her reign in Antioch, Syria's administrative capital. Before the monarchy, Palmyra had the institutions of a Greek city (polis) and was ruled by a senate which was responsible for most civil affairs. Odaenathus maintained Palmyra's institutions, as did Zenobia; a Palmyrene inscription after her fall records the name of Septimius Haddudan, a Palmyrene senator. However, the queen apparently ruled autocratically; Septimius Worod, Odaenathus' viceroy and one of Palmyra's most important officials, disappeared from the record after Zenobia's ascent. The queen opened the doors of her government to Eastern nobility. Zenobia's most important courtiers and advisers were her generals, Septemius Zabdas and Septimius Zabbai; both of whom were generals under Odaenathus and received the gentilicium (surname) "Septimius" from him.

Odaenathus respected the Roman emperor's privilege of appointing provincial governors, and Zenobia continued this policy during her early reign. Although the queen did not interfere in day-to-day administration, she probably had the power to command the governors in the organization of border security. During the rebellion, Zenobia maintained Roman forms of administration, but appointed the governors herself (most notably in Egypt, where Julius Marcellinus took office in 270 and was followed by Statilius Ammianus in 271). (Note: One of Statilius' inscriptions is firmly dated to spring 272, so he could have been appointed by the Romans who regained Egypt at that time.)

====== Agreement with Rome ======
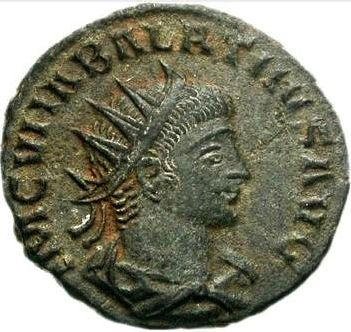
Antoninianus of Vaballathus as emperor (augustus), AD 272.

Zenobia initially avoided provoking Rome by claiming for herself and her son the titles, inherited from Odaenathus, of subject of Rome and protector of its eastern frontier. After expanding her territory, she seems to have tried to be recognized as an imperial partner in the eastern half of the empire and presented her son as subordinate to the emperor. In late 270, Zenobia minted coinage bearing the portraits of Aurelian and Vaballathus; Aurelian was titled "emperor", and Vaballathus "king". The regnal year in early samples of the coinage was only Aurelian's. By March 271, despite indicating Aurelian as the paramount monarch by naming him first in the dating formulae, the coinage also began bearing Vaballathus' regnal year. By indicating in the coinage that Vaballathus' reign began in 267 (three years before the emperor's), Vaballathus appeared to be Aurelian's senior colleague.

The emperor's blessing of Palmyrene authority has been debated; Aurelian's acceptance of Palmyrene rule in Egypt may be inferred from the Oxyrhynchus papyri, which are dated by the regnal years of the emperor and Vaballathus. No proof of a formal agreement exists, and the evidence is based solely on the joint coinage- and papyri-dating. It is unlikely that Aurelian would have accepted such power-sharing, but he was unable to act in 271 due to crises in the West. His apparent condoning of Zenobia's actions may have been a ruse to give her a false sense of security while he prepared for war. Another reason for Aurelian's tolerance may have been his desire to ensure a constant supply of Egyptian grain to Rome; it is not recorded that the supply was cut, and the ships sailed to Rome in 270 as usual. Some modern scholars, such as Harold Mattingly, suggest that Claudius Gothicus had concluded a formal agreement with Zenobia which Aurelian ignored.

==== Empress and open rebellion ====
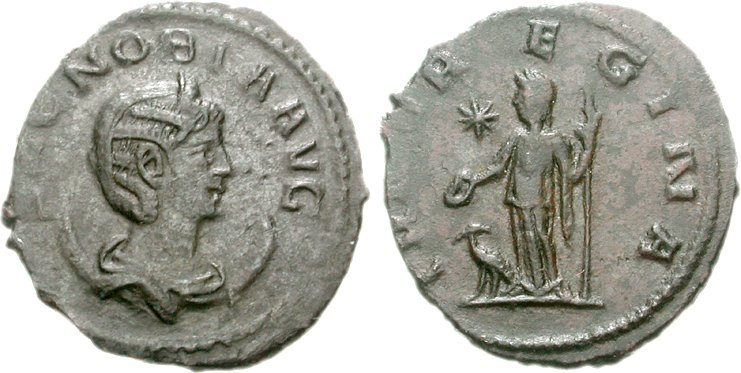
Coin of Zenobia as empress with Juno on the reverse, AD 272

An inscription, found in Palmyra and dated to August 271, called Zenobia eusebes (the pious); this title, used by Roman empresses, could be seen as a step by the queen toward an imperial title. Another contemporary inscription called her sebaste, the Greek equivalent of "empress" (Latin: Augusta), but also acknowledged the Roman emperor. (Note: An Egyptian grain receipt dated to June 241 refers to both Aurelian and Vaballathus as Augusti, but it is considered an anomaly and most likely a scribal error.) Finally, Palmyra officially broke with Rome; the Alexandrian and Antiochian mints removed Aurelian's portrait from the coins in April 272, issuing new tetradrachms in the names of Vaballathus and Zenobia (who were called Augustus and Augusta, respectively). On Zenobia's antoninianus of 272, she appeared as a Roman ruler, depicting herself in the style of the Syrian Empresses: Julia Domna, Julia Mamaea and Julia Soaemias. Zenobia's use of images of Juno and Jupiter on her and her son's coins, respectively, reflected an attempt to present her and her son as supreme heads of Rome.

The assumption of imperial titles by Zenobia signaled a usurpation: independence from, and open rebellion against, Aurelian. The timeline of events and why Zenobia declared herself empress is vague. In the second half of 271, Aurelian marched to the East, but was delayed by the Goths in the Balkans; this may have alarmed the queen, driving her to claim the imperial title. Zenobia also probably understood the inevitability of open conflict with Aurelian, and decided that feigning subordination would be useless; her assumption of the imperial title was used to rally soldiers to her cause. Aurelian's campaign seems to have been the main reason for the Palmyrene imperial declaration and the removal of his portrait from its coins.

==== Downfall ====
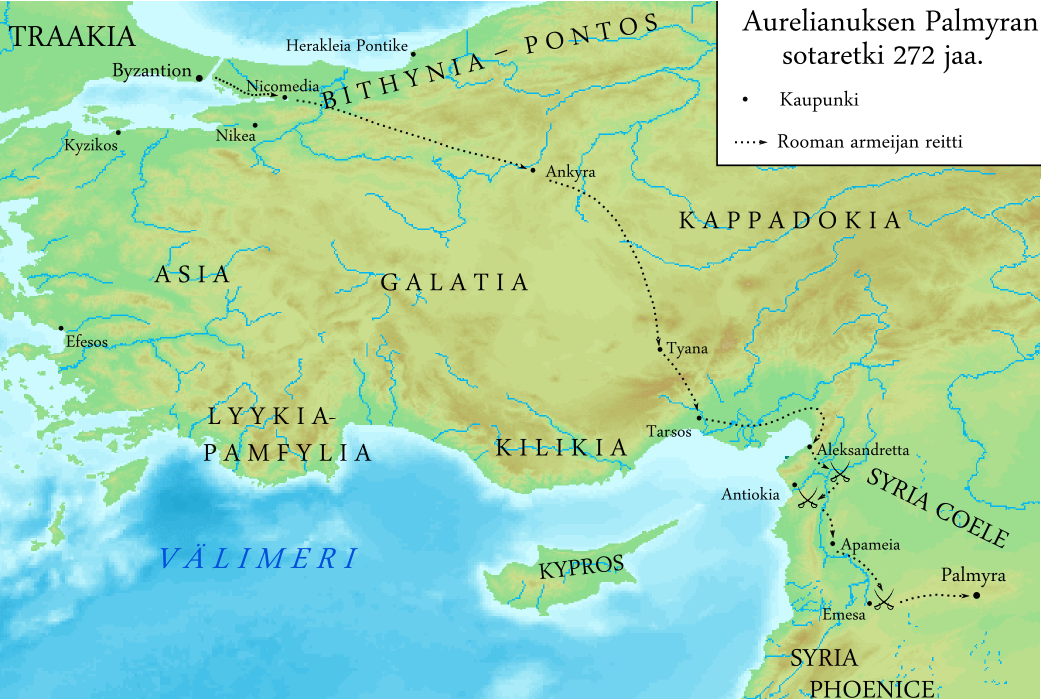
Route of Aurelian's campaign

The usurpation, which began in late March or early April 272, ended by August. Aurelian spent the winter of 271–272 in Byzantium, and probably crossed the Bosporus to Asia Minor in April 272. Galatia fell easily; the Palmyrene garrisons were apparently withdrawn, and the provincial capital of Ancyra was regained without a struggle. All the cities in Asia Minor opened their doors to the Roman emperor, with only Tyana putting up some resistance before surrendering; this cleared the path for Aurelian to invade Syria, the Palmyrene heartland. A simultaneous expedition reached Egypt in May 272; by early June Alexandria was captured by the Romans, followed by the rest of Egypt by the third week of June. Zenobia seems to have withdrawn most of her armies from Egypt to focus on Syria—which, if lost, would have meant the end of Palmyra.

In May 272, Aurelian headed toward Antioch. About 40 kilometres (25 mi) north of the city, he defeated the Palmyrene army (led by Zabdas) at the Battle of Immae. As a result, Zenobia, who waited in Antioch during the battle, retreated with her army to Emesa. To conceal the disaster and make her flight safer, she spread reports that Aurelian was captured; Zabdas found a man who resembled the Roman emperor and paraded him through Antioch. The following day, Aurelian entered the city before marching south. After defeating a Palmyrene garrison south of Antioch, Aurelian continued his march to meet Zenobia in the Battle of Emesa.

The 70,000-strong Palmyrene army, assembled on the plain of Emesa, nearly routed the Romans. In an initial thrill of victory they hastened their advance, breaking their lines and enabling the Roman infantry to attack their flank. The defeated Zenobia headed to her capital on the advice of her war council, leaving her treasury behind. In Palmyra, the empress prepared for a siege; Aurelian blockaded food-supply routes, and there were probably unsuccessful negotiations. According to the Augustan History, Zenobia said that she would fight Aurelian with the help of her Persian allies; however, the story was probably fabricated and used by the emperor to link Zenobia to Rome's greatest enemy. If such an alliance existed, a much-larger frontier war would have erupted; however, no Persian army was sent. As the situation worsened, the queen left the city for Persia intending to seek help from Palmyra's former enemy; according to Zosimus, she rode a "female camel, the fastest of its breed and faster than any horse".

== Captivity and fate ==
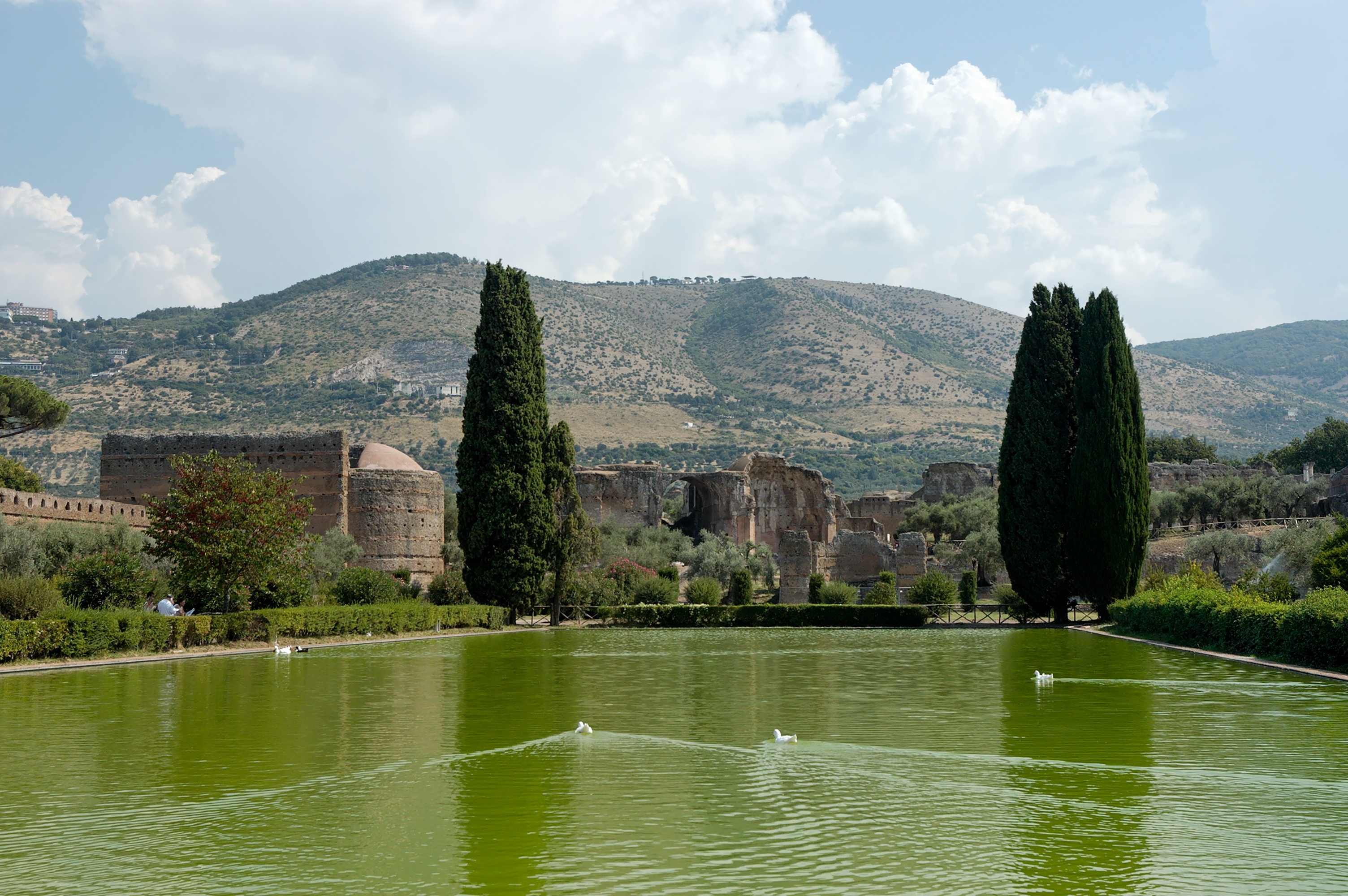
Hadrian's Villa; Zenobia reportedly spent her last days in a villa near Hadrian's complex in Tibur.

Aurelian, learning about Zenobia's departure, sent a contingent which captured the empress before she could cross the Euphrates to Persia; Palmyra capitulated soon after news of Zenobia's captivity reached the city in August 272. (Note: Many ancient writers, including John Malalas, Rufius Festus, Jordanes, George Syncellus and Jerome, mistakenly wrote that Zenobia was captured at Immae.) Aurelian sent the empress and her son to Emesa for trial, followed by most of Palmyra's court elite (including Longinus). According to the Augustan History and Zosimus, Zenobia blamed her actions on her advisers; however, there are no contemporary sources describing the trial, only later hostile Roman ones. The empress's reported cowardice in defeat was probably Aurelian's propaganda; it benefited the emperor to paint Zenobia as selfish and traitorous, discouraging the Palmyrenes from hailing her as a heroine. Although Aurelian had most of his prisoners executed, he spared the empress and her son to parade her in his planned triumph.

Zenobia's fate after Emesa is uncertain since ancient historians left conflicting accounts. Zosimus wrote that she died before crossing the Bosporus on her way to Rome; according to this account, the empress became ill or starved herself to death. The generally unreliable chronicler John Malalas wrote that Aurelian humiliated Zenobia by parading her through the eastern cities on a dromedary; in Antioch, the emperor had her chained and seated on a dais in the hippodrome for three days before the city's populace. Malalas concluded his account by writing that Zenobia appeared in Aurelian's triumph and was then beheaded.

Most ancient historians and modern scholars agree that Zenobia was displayed in Aurelian's 274 triumph; Zosimus was the only source to say that the empress died before reaching Rome, making his account questionable. A public humiliation (as recounted by Malalas) is a plausible scenario, since Aurelian would probably have wanted to publicize his suppression of the Palmyrene rebellion. Only Malalas, however, describes Zenobia's beheading; according to the other historians, her life was spared after Aurelian's triumph. The Augustan History recorded that Aurelian gave Zenobia a villa in Tibur near Hadrian's Villa, where she lived with her children. Zonaras wrote that Zenobia married a nobleman, and Syncellus wrote that she married a Roman senator. The house she reportedly occupied became a tourist attraction in Rome.

== Titles ==
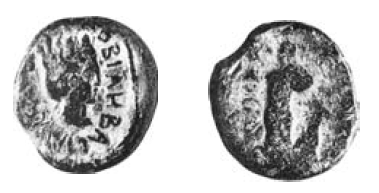
Lead token naming Zenobia as queen c. 268

The queen owed her elevated position to her son's minority. To celebrate Herodianus' coronation, a statue was erected in Palmyra in 263. According to the inscription on the base of the statue, it was commissioned by Septimius Worod, then the duumviri (magistrate) of Palmyra, and Julius Aurelius, the Queen's procurator (treasurer). According to the historian David Potter, Zenobia is the queen mentioned, and the inscription is an evidence for the usage of the title by her during Odaenathus' lifetime. An inscription on a milestone on the road between Palmyra and Emesa, dated to Zenobia's early reign, identifies her as "illustrious queen, mother of the king of kings"; this was the first inscription giving her an official position. A lead token from Antioch also identifies Zenobia as queen. (Note: Dated to 268, its code in Delbert R. Hillers and Eleonora Cussini's work, titled "Palmyrene Aramaic Texts" (PAT), is PAT 2827, and the inscription read: queen Zenobia.)

The earliest confirmed attestation of Zenobia as queen in Palmyra is an inscription on the base of a statue erected for her by Zabdas and Zabbai, dated to August 271 and calling her "most illustrious and pious queen". On an undated milestone found near Byblos, Zenobia is titled Sebaste. The queen was never acknowledged as sole monarch in Palmyra, although she was the de facto sovereign of the empire; she was always associated with her husband or son in inscriptions, except in Egypt (where some coins were minted in Zenobia's name alone). According to her coins, the queen assumed the title of Augusta (empress) in 272, and reigned under the regnal name Septimia Zenobia Augusta. In 272, Zenobia, no longer acting as queen-regent, but as Empress of the East, rode forth to beat back the Roman Empire.

== Descendants ==
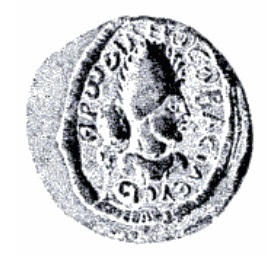
Septimius Herodianus, might have been the same person as Hairan II, a probable son of Zenobia

Aside from Vaballathus, it is unclear if Zenobia had other children, and their alleged identities are subject to scholarly disagreements. The image of a child named Hairan (II) appears on a seal impression with that of his brother Vaballathus; no name of a mother was engraved and the seal is undated. Odaenathus' son Herodianus is identified by Udo Hartmann with Hairan I, a son of Odaenathus who appears in Palmyrene inscriptions as early as 251. David S. Potter, on the other hand, suggested that Hairan II is the son of Zenobia and that he is Herodianus instead of Hairan I. Nathanael Andrade maintained that Hairan I, Herodianus, and Hairan II are the same person, rejecting the existence of a second Hairan.

A controversial Palmyrene inscription mentions the mother of the King Septimius Antiochus; the name of the queen is missing, and Dittenberger refused to fill the gap with Zenobia's name, but many scholars, such as Grace Macurdy considered that the missing name is Zenobia. Septimius Antiochus may have been Vaballathus' younger brother, or was presented in this manner for political reasons; Antiochus was proclaimed emperor in 273, when Palmyra revolted against Rome for a second time. If Antiochus was a son of Zenobia, he was probably a young child not fathered by Odaenathus; Zosimus described him as insignificant, appropriate for a five-year-old boy. On the other hand, Macurdy, citing the language Zosimus used when he described him, considered it more plausible that Antiochus was not a son of Zenobia, but a family relation who used her name to legitimize his claim to the throne.

The names of Herennianus and Timolaus were mentioned as children of Zenobia only in the Historia Augusta. Herennianus may be a conflation of Hairan and Herodianus; Timolaus is probably a fabrication, although the historian Dietmar Kienast suggested that he might have been Vaballathus. According to the Historia Augusta, Zenobia's descendants were Roman nobility during the reign of Emperor Valens (reigned 364–375). Eutropius and Jerome chronicled the queen's descendants in Rome during the fourth and fifth centuries. They may have been the result of a reported marriage to a Roman spouse or offspring who accompanied her from Palmyra; both theories, however, are tentative. Zonaras is the only historian to note that Zenobia had daughters; he wrote that one married Aurelian, who married the queen's other daughters to distinguished Romans. According to Southern, the emperor's marriage to Zenobia's daughter is a fabrication. Another descent claim is the relation of saint Zenobius of Florence (337–417) with the queen; the Girolami banking family claimed descent from the fifth century saint, and the alleged relation was first noted in 1286. The family also extended their roots to Zenobia by claiming that the saint was a descendant of her.

== Evaluation and legacy ==
An evaluation of Zenobia is difficult; the queen was courageous when her husband's supremacy was threatened and by seizing the throne, she protected the region from a power vacuum after Odaenathus' death. According to Watson, she made what Odaenathus left her a "glittering show of strength". In the view of Watson, Zenobia should not be seen as a total powermonger, nor as a selfless hero fighting for a cause; according to the historian David Graf, "She took seriously the titles and responsibilities she assumed for her son and that her program was far more ecumenical and imaginative than that of her husband Odenathus, not just more ambitious".

Zenobia has inspired scholars, academics, musicians and actors; her fame has lingered in the West, and is supreme in the Middle East. As a heroic queen with a tragic end, she stands alongside Cleopatra and Boudica. The queen's legend turned her into an idol, that can be reinterpreted to accommodate the needs of writers and historians; thus, Zenobia has been by turns a freedom fighter, a hero of the oppressed and a national symbol. The queen is a female role model; according to the historian Michael Rostovtzeff, Catherine the Great liked to compare herself to Zenobia as a woman who created military might and an intellectual court. During the 1930s, thanks to an Egyptian-based feminist press, Zenobia became an icon for women's-magazine readers in the Arabic-speaking world as a strong, nationalistic female leader.

Her most lasting legacy is in Syria, where the queen is a national symbol. Zenobia became an icon for Syrian nationalists; she had a cult following among Western-educated Syrians, and an 1871 novel by journalist Salim Al Bustani was entitled Zenobia malikat Tadmor (Zenobia, Queen of Palmyra). Syrian nationalist Ilyas Matar, who wrote Syria's first history in Arabic in 1874, (al-'Uqud al-durriyya fi tarikh al-mamlaka al-Suriyya; The Pearl Necklace in the History of the Syrian Kingdom), was fascinated by Zenobia and included her in his book. To Matar, the queen kindled hope for a new Zenobia who would restore Syria's former grandeur. Another history of Syria was written by Jurji Yanni in 1881, in which Yanni called Zenobia a "daughter of the fatherland", and yearned for her "glorious past". Yanni described Aurelian as a tyrant who deprived Syria of its happiness and independence by capturing its queen.

In modern Syria, Zenobia is regarded as a patriotic symbol; her image appeared on banknotes, and in 1997 she was the subject of the television series Al-Ababeed (The Anarchy). The series was watched by millions in the Arabic-speaking world. It examined the Israeli–Palestinian conflict from a Syrian perspective, where the queen's struggle symbolized the Palestinians' struggle to gain the right of self-determination. Zenobia was also the subject of a biography by Mustafa Tlass, Syria's former minister of defense and one of the country's most prominent figures.

== Myth, romanticism and popular culture ==
Harold Mattingly called Zenobia "one of the most romantic figures in history". According to Southern, "The real Zenobia is elusive, perhaps ultimately unattainable, and novelists, playwrights and historians alike can absorb the available evidence, but still need to indulge in varied degrees of speculation."

She has been the subject of romantic and ideologically-driven biographies by ancient and modern writers. The Augustan History is the clearest example of an ideological account of Zenobia's life, and its author acknowledged that it was written to criticize the emperor Gallienus. According to the Augustan History, Gallienus was weak because he allowed a woman to rule part of the empire and Zenobia was a more able sovereign than the emperor. The narrative changed as the Augustan History moved on to the life of Claudius Gothicus, a lauded and victorious emperor, with the author characterizing Zenobia's protection of the eastern frontier as a wise delegation of power by Claudius. When the Augustan History reached the biography of Aurelian, the author's view of Zenobia changed dramatically; the queen is depicted as a guilty, insolent, proud coward; her wisdom was discredited and her actions deemed the result of manipulation by advisers.

Zenobia's "staunch" beauty was emphasized by the author of the Augustan History, who ascribed to her feminine timidity and inconsistency (the reasons for her alleged betrayal of her advisers to save herself). The queen's sex posed a dilemma for the Augustan History since it cast a shadow on Aurelian's victory. Its author ascribed many masculine traits to Zenobia to make Aurelian a conquering hero who suppressed a dangerous Amazon queen. According to the Augustan History, Zenobia had a clear, manly voice, dressed as an emperor (rather than an empress), rode horseback, was attended by eunuchs instead of ladies-in-waiting, marched with her army, drank with her generals, was careful with money (contrary to the stereotypical spending habits of her sex) and pursued masculine hobbies such as hunting. Giovanni Boccaccio wrote a fanciful fourteenth-century account of the queen in which she is a tomboy in childhood who preferred wrestling with boys, wandering in the forests and killing goats to playing like a young girl. Zenobia's chastity was a theme of these romanticized accounts; according to the Augustan History, she disdained sexual intercourse and allowed Odaenathus into her bed only for conception. Her reputed chastity impressed some male historians; Edward Gibbon wrote that Zenobia surpassed Cleopatra in chastity and valor. According to Boccaccio, Zenobia safeguarded her virginity when she wrestled with boys as a child.

Seventeenth-century visitors to Palmyra rekindled the Western world's romantic interest in Zenobia. This interest peaked during the mid-nineteenth century, when Lady Hester Stanhope visited Palmyra and wrote that its people treated her like the queen; she was reportedly greeted with singing and dancing, and Bedouin warriors stood on the city's columns. A procession ended with a mock coronation of Stanhope under the arch of Palmyra as "queen of the desert". William Ware, fascinated by Zenobia, wrote a fanciful account of her life. Twentieth-century novelists and playwrights, such as Haley Elizabeth Garwood and Nick Dear, also wrote about the queen.

=== Selected cultural depictions ===
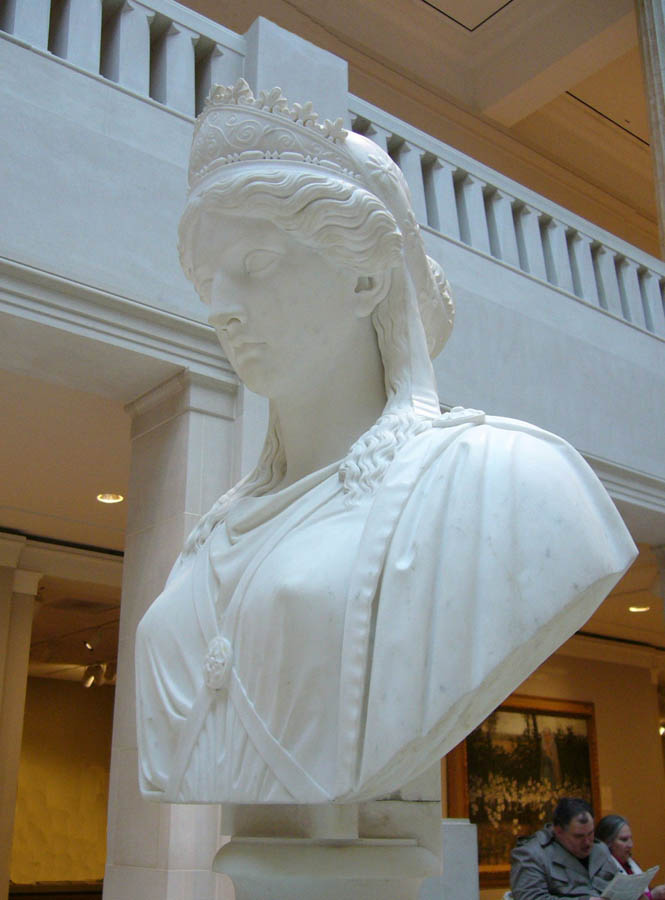
Harriet Hosmer's Zenobia, Queen of Palmyra (1857)

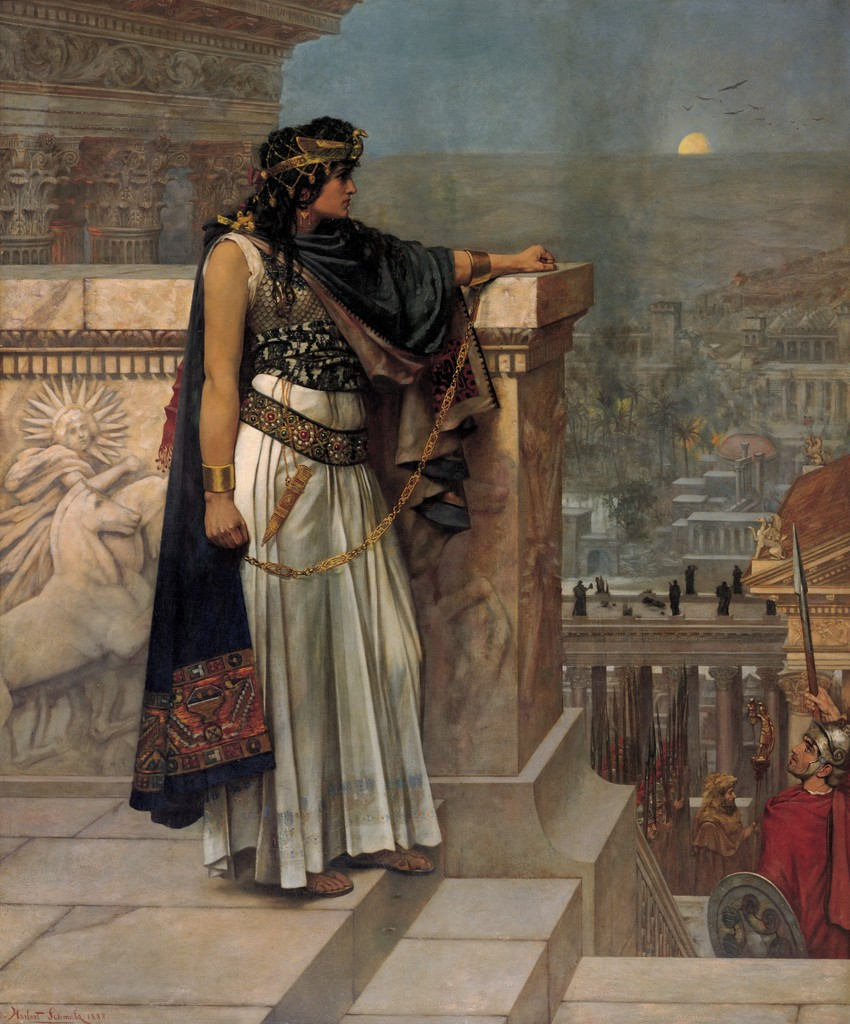
Zenobia's Last Look on Palmyra by Herbert Gustave Schmalz (1888)

- Sculptures:
  - Zenobia, Queen of Palmyra (1857) by Harriet Hosmer, exhibited at the Art Institute of Chicago.
  - Zenobia in Chains (1859) by Harriet Hosmer. Two copies were made, one exhibited at the Huntington Library and the other at the Saint Louis Art Museum.
- Literature:
  - Chaucer narrates a condensed story of Zenobia's life in one of a series of "tragedies" in "The Monk's Tale".
  - La gran Cenobia (1625) by Pedro Calderón de la Barca.
  - Zénobie, tragédie. Où la vérité de l'Histoire est conservée dans l'observation des plus rigoureuses règles du Poème Dramatique (1647) by François Hédelin.
  - Zenobia, Queen of Palmyra; a Narrative, Founded on History. (1814) by Adelaide O'Keeffe.
  - The Queen of the East (1956) by Alexander Baron.
  - Moi, Zénobie reine de Palmyre (1978) by Bernard Simiot.
  - The Chronicle of Zenobia (2006) by Judith Weingarten.
  - "A Predicament" (1838) by Edgar Allan Poe.
- Paintings:
  - Queen Zenobia Addressing her Soldiers by Giambattista Tiepolo; it dates to the early eighteenth century but the exact year is not known. This painting (part of a series of tableaux of Zenobia) was painted by Tiepolo on the walls of the Zenobio family palace in Venice, although they were unrelated to the queen.
  - Zenobia's Last Look on Palmyra (1888) by Herbert Gustave Schmalz.
- Operas:
  - Zenobia (1694): Tomaso Albinoni's first opera.
  - Zenobia in Palmira (1725) by Leonardo Leo.
  - Zenobia (1761) by Johann Adolph Hasse.
  - Zenobia in Palmira (1789) by Pasquale Anfossi.
  - Zenobia in Palmira (1790) by Giovanni Paisiello.
  - Aureliano in Palmira (1813) by Gioachino Rossini.
  - Zenobia, Queen of Palmyra (1882) by Silas G. Pratt.
  - Zenobia (2007) by Mansour Rahbani.
- Play: Zenobia (1995), by Nick Dear, was first performed at the Young Vic as a co-production with the Royal Shakespeare Company.
- Song: "Zenobia" (1971), written by the Rahbani Brothers and sang by Fairuz as part of the Rahbani Brothers' 1971 musical play Nas Min Waraq (people of paper).
- Film: Nel Segno di Roma, a 1959 Italian film starring Anita Ekberg.
- Television: Al-Ababeed (1997), Syrian television series starring Raghda as Zenobia.
- Video games: Zenobia appears as a playable Archer-class Servant in the 2015 mobile game Fate/Grand Order by Lasengle and Aniplex. She is also playable as the faction leader of Palmyra in Empire Divided (2017), an expansion pack for the strategy game Total War: Rome II (2013).

== See also ==
- Crisis of the Third Century
- Gallic Empire
- Mavia (queen)
- Zenobia of Armenia
