= Callinicus (sophist) =

3rd-century Greek historian, orator, rhetorician and sophist

Callinicus (Ancient Greek: Καλλίνικος), surnamed or nicknamed Sutorius or Suetorius (Σουητώριος), sometimes known as Kallinikos of Petra or Callinicus of Petra was an ancient Greek historian of Arab descent, orator, rhetorician and sophist who flourished in the 3rd century.

He came from a local eminent family from either Arabia Petraea or Syria. Little is known about his family except that his father's Praenomen was Gaius.

Callinicus was one of the most cultural figures that came from the Eastern Roman Empire. He was a contemporary and friend to Roman Emperor Gallienus (253-268) and Queen of the Palmyrene Empire, Zenobia.

During the reign of Gallienus and his father Valerian, Callinicus taught Rhetoric in Athens, Greece. Later Callinicus accepted the patronage of Syrian Queen of Palmyra, Zenobia (reigned before 258–273). Callinicus moved and lived in Zenobia's court first in Palmyra and later in Alexandria, Egypt.

In 273, Callinicus was executed with Zenobia's chief counselor and Greek sophist, Cassius Longinus on the orders of Roman Emperor Aurelian in the city, Callinicum on the Euphrates (modern Raqqa, Syria). Zenobia had revolted against the Roman Empire and Aurelian had defeated and ended Zenobia's revolt from Rome in Emesa (modern Homs, Syria).

Callinicus had written various literacy pieces including a number of speeches and Encomiums. His works include:

- To Lupus, On Bad Taste on Rhetoric
- Prosphonetikon to Gallienus, a salute addressed to the emperor
- To Cleopatra, On the History of Alexandria, 10 books written on the history of Alexandria who were dedicated to a “Cleopatra”, who was most probably Zenobia. She claims to be a descendant of Ptolemaic Greek Queen Cleopatra VII of Egypt
- On the Renewal of Rome
- Against the Philosophical Sects

== Sources ==
- Palmyra and Its Empire: Zenobia's Revolt against Rome - by Richard Stoneman
- Aurelian and the Third Century - by Alaric Watson
- www.ancientlibrary.com/smith-bio/0582.html
- www.leeds.ac.uk/classics/heath/sudabits.html
- https://web.archive.org/web/20091027102056/http://geocities.com/christopherjbennett/ptolemies/selene_ii.htm
