= Zenobia's Last Look on Palmyra =

Painting by Herbert Gustave Schmalz

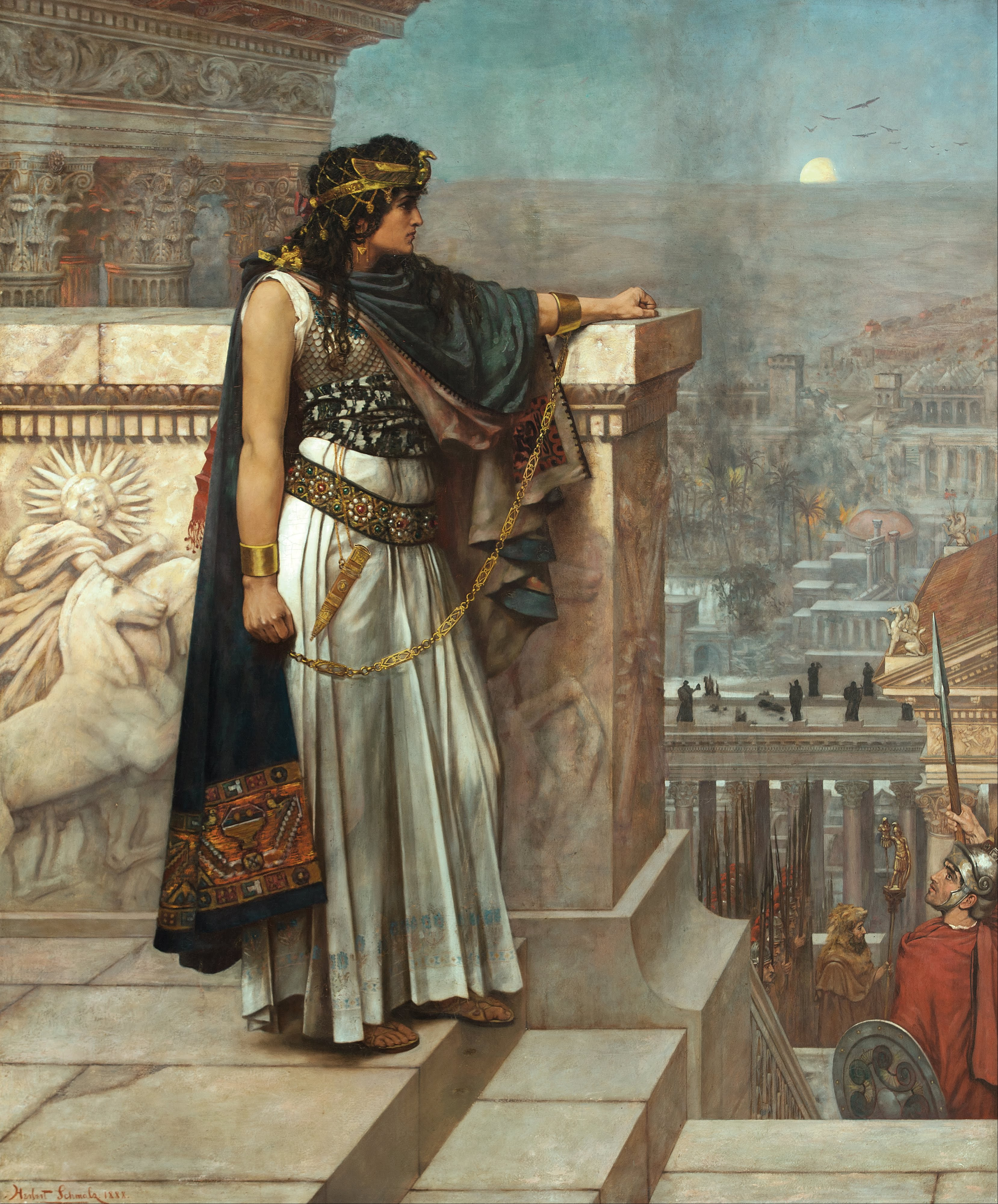
- Artist: Herbert Gustave Schmalz
- Year: 1888
- Type: Oil on canvas, history painting
- Dimensions: 183.4 cm × 154.6 cm (72.2 in × 60.9 in)
- Location: Art Gallery of South Australia, Adelaide

Zenobia's Last Look on Palmyra is an 1888 history painting by the British artist Herbert Gustave Schmalz. It depicts Queen Zenobia in chains taking a final look at the city of Palmyra before being taken away by her Roman captors following her defeat by Aurelian. Zenobia's Palmyrene Empire had for a brief period overrun much of the eastern Roman Empire. The scene is drawn from the Historia Augusta.

The picture was displayed at the Exhibition of the New Gallery in London's Regent Street in 1888. Today it forms part of the collection of the Art Gallery of South Australia in Adelaide, having been acquired in 1890.

== Bibliography ==
- Michelakis, Pantelis & Wyke, Maria. The Ancient World in Silent Cinema. Cambridge University Press, 2013.
- Trumble, Angus. Love & Death: Art in the Age of Queen Victoria. Art Gallery of South Australia, 2001.
