= Septimius Haddudan =

3rd-century Palmyrene official

High Priest of the Temple of Bel
- Monarch: Odaenathus

Personal details
- Born: Palmyra, Roman Syria
- Parent: Septimius Ogeilu Haddudan

Septimius Haddudan was a 3rd-century Palmyrene official, the only known Palmyrene senator other than Odaenathus, and a priest and symposiarch of the god Bel, who is known to have opposed the rule of Queen Zenobia of Palmyra and aided the Roman Empire during their wars against the queen.

== Origin ==
Haddudan is a rather obscure figure, so there is very little known about his origins. He was most likely born in Palmyra, and an inscription at the Temple of Bel reveals his ancestry, where he is recorded as "The son of Septimius Ogeilu Maqqai".

Like Odaenathus and many other important Palmyrene officials at the time, his family adopted the surname of the Severi as a sign of loyalty to the imperial throne. His father was extremely loyal to Odaenathus, and he made a dedication in his honor. Haddudan's family were also credited by some historians as the "king-makers" of Odaenathus.

== Career ==
He is known to have opposed the rule of Queen Zenobia who rebelled against the Roman Empire during the Crisis of the Third Century, and later to oppose the rebels who tried to defy Emperor Aurelian after the capture of Zenobia.

He is mentioned in an inscription at the Temple of Bel mentioning his help to the Romans during the Palmyrene revolts. The inscription styles him as "The high priest Septimius Haddudan, illustrious senator, son of Septimius Ogeilu Maqqai, who had aided the army of Aurelian Caesar", which shows that the priests of the Temple of Bel were probably among the first of the Palmyrenes to support the Emperor Aurelian and defy Zenobia. Although it is implied that he had helped the Romans in one way or another during the Palmyrene revolts, it is unknown how, why and when, as the line giving the Seleucid date is damaged.

It is probable that he had aided the Romans during the short-lived rebellion of 273 when the Romans were waging war on the Capri in the Balkans, but it is also possible that the inscription refers to his military cooperation during the Siege of Palmyra and the subsequent capture of Zenobia and her son in 272.

Whatever the "help" he supposedly gave to the Romans, it's feasible that he was Aurelian's choice of local leader or figurehead after the capture of Zenobia in 272, with there being a need to place someone at the head of local administration in the city, and also likely that he facilitated in the restoration of law and order after the rebellion.

His fate, like many other Palmyrenes after the sack of the city by the Romans under Aurelian, remains unknown. But it was likely that he was spared for his help for the empire.

== In fiction ==
Haddudan is a minor character in JD Smith's 2014 highly fictionalized work of historical fiction, The Rise of Zenobia, as well as in Judith Weingarten's The Chronicle of Zenobia. In the latter work, Haddudan is represented as cold, calculating and ruthless.

In the 1996 highly fictionalized Syrian soap opera, Al-Ababeed (The Anarchy), based on 3rd century Palmyra, the character of Elahbel in the show, the powerful, ruthless and treacherous Palmyrene courtier who betrays Zenobia and gives aid to the Romans, played by Salloum Haddad, appears to be based on Haddudan.

== Ancestry ==
Ancestors of Septimius Haddudan

4. Maqqai Haddudan
2. Septimius Ogeilu Haddudan
1. Septimius Haddudan

== Sources ==
- Southern, Patricia (2015). The Roman Empire from Severus to Constantine. Routledge. ISBN 978-1-317-49694-6.
- Stoneman, Richard (1994) [1992]. Palmyra and Its Empire: Zenobia's Revolt Against Rome. University of Michigan Press. ISBN 978-0-472-08315-2.
- Watson, Alaric (2014). Aurelian and the Third Century. ISBN 9781134908158.
