= Hairan II =

3rd century prince of Palmyra

Hairan II was a Palmyrene prince, the son of king Odaenathus and, possibly, his second wife Zenobia.

== Seal RTP 736 ==
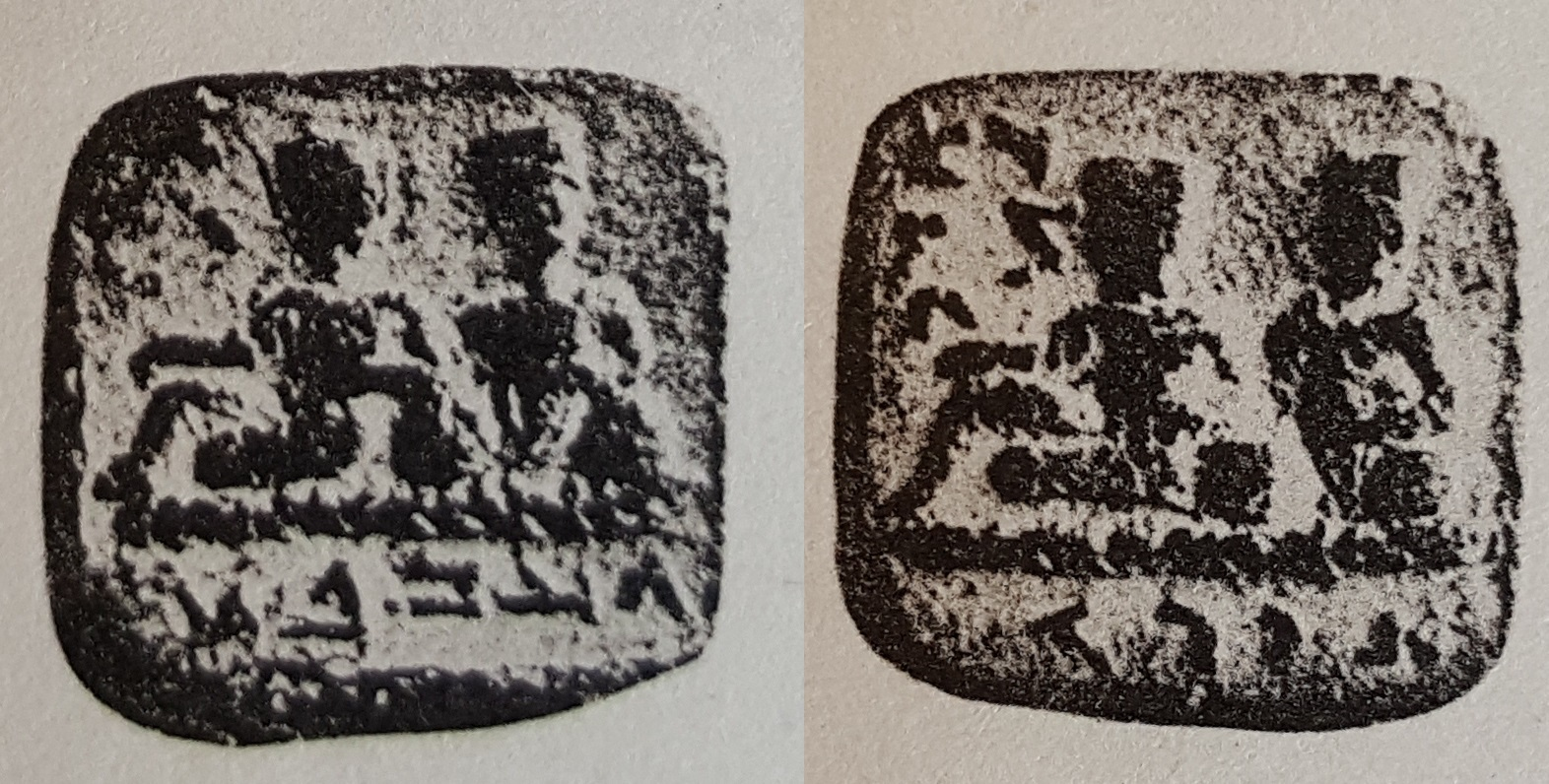
RTP 736: Odaenathus with Hairan (right) and with Vaballathus (left)

The existence of Hairan was established by the discovery of a lead seal (code named RTP 736). (Note: RTP refers to "Recueil Des Tessères de Palmyre") The seal bears the images of two priests, one on each side. On one of the sides, the name of Odaenathus' son and successor Vaballathus was engraved under the image as a legend, while the name of Hairan was engraved on the other side. The name of Odaenathus was engraved on both sides. No name of a mother was engraved and the seal is undated.

== King Herodianus and Hairan II ==
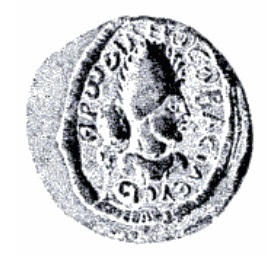
King Septimius Herodianus

Odaenathus had another son, Hairan I, who appeared in different inscriptions dated from 251 AD onward. On a lead seal, the name of Septimius Herodianus, king of kings, appears; scholars argue whether Septimius Herodianus was Hairan I or II.

The Augustan History mentions that Odaenathus had many sons, including one named Herodes (from an earlier marriage) and another named Herennianus. According to Henri Arnold Seyrig, Hairan II must be identical with Herennianus and he was an older brother of Vaballathus and did not reign. Seyrig distinguishes Hairan I from the Hairan on seal RTP 736. Andreas Alföldi also suggested that Septimius Herodianus is Herennianus; another seal associated with the seal of Septimius Herodianus represented a woman crowned with laurel leaf who, according to Alföldi, can only be Zenobia. Hence, Septimius Herodianus is the son of Zenobia and Odaenathus. In the view of Alföldi, Odaenathus's eldest son, Herodes of the Augustan History, would not have been called King of Kings during his father's lifetime and Septimius Herodianus briefly succeeded his father.

Udo Hartmann argues that Septimius Herodianus is the same as Hairan I and that Herodianus is the Greek version of Hairan and that "Herodes" is a corruption of Hairan. David S. Potter disagrees and believes that Septimius Herodianus is Zenobia's son, identical with Hairan II and different from Hairan I.
