= Herbert Gustave Schmalz =

English painter (1856–1935)

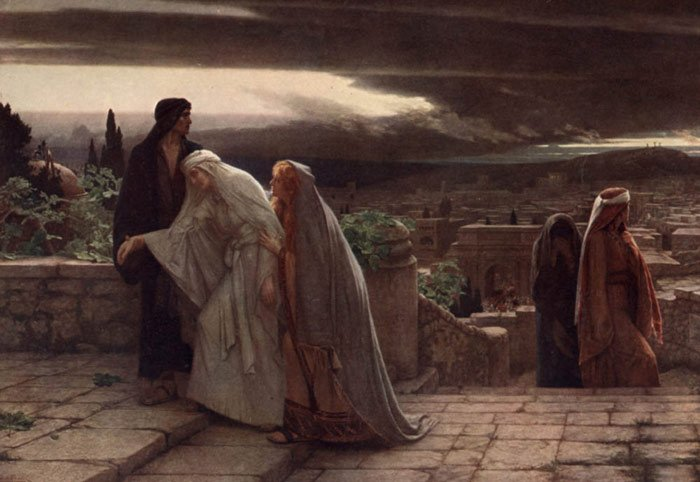
Return from Calvary

Herbert Gustave Schmalz, known as Herbert Carmichael after 1918 (1 June 1856, Newcastle – 21 November 1935, London) was an English painter. "Utterly hostile to impressionism", he was noted for his Christian art.

== Life ==
Schmalz was born at Ryton, North East England in 1856, the son of Margaret and Gustave Schmalz. His father was a merchant, and later Prussian consul in Newcastle upon Tyne, whilst his mother was the eldest daughter of painter James Wilson Carmichael. He was educated at Durham School. He received a conventional education in painting, first at the South Kensington Art School and later at the Royal Academy of Arts, where he studied with Frank Dicksee, Stanhope Forbes and Arthur Hacker. He perfected his studies in Antwerp at the Royal Academy of Fine Arts.

After his return to London he made a name for himself as a history painter, with a style influenced by the Pre-Raphaelites and orientalism. In 1884 he successfully exhibited his painting Too Late at the Royal Academy. After a voyage to Jerusalem in 1890 he made a series of paintings with New Testament topics, with Return from Calvary (1891) one of the best known.

After 1895 Schmalz increasingly painted portraits. In 1900 he held a big solo exhibition named "A Dream of Fair Women" in the Fine Art Society in Bond Street.

Schmalz was friends with William Holman Hunt, Val Prinsep and Frederic Leighton. In October 1918, after Germany was defeated in World War I, he adopted his mother's maiden name. On 30 April 1899, he married Edith Ellen Pullan at St Peter's Church, Pimlico. He died in London on 21 November 1935.

== Other selected paintings ==
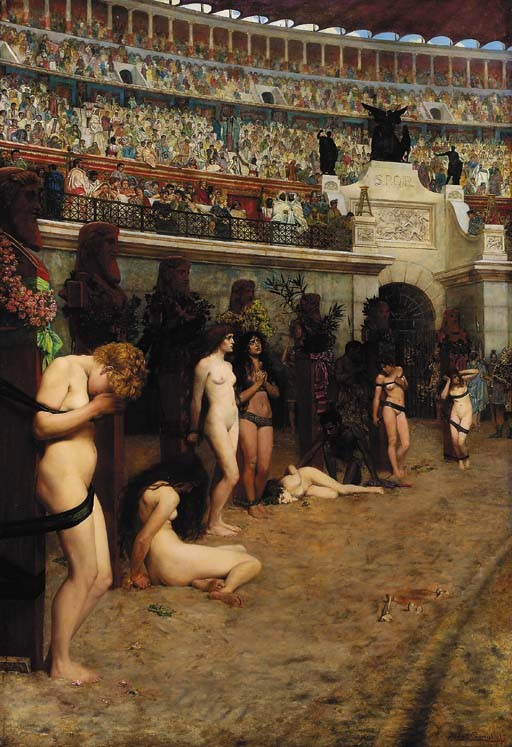
Faithful unto Death, Christianae ad Leones! (1888)

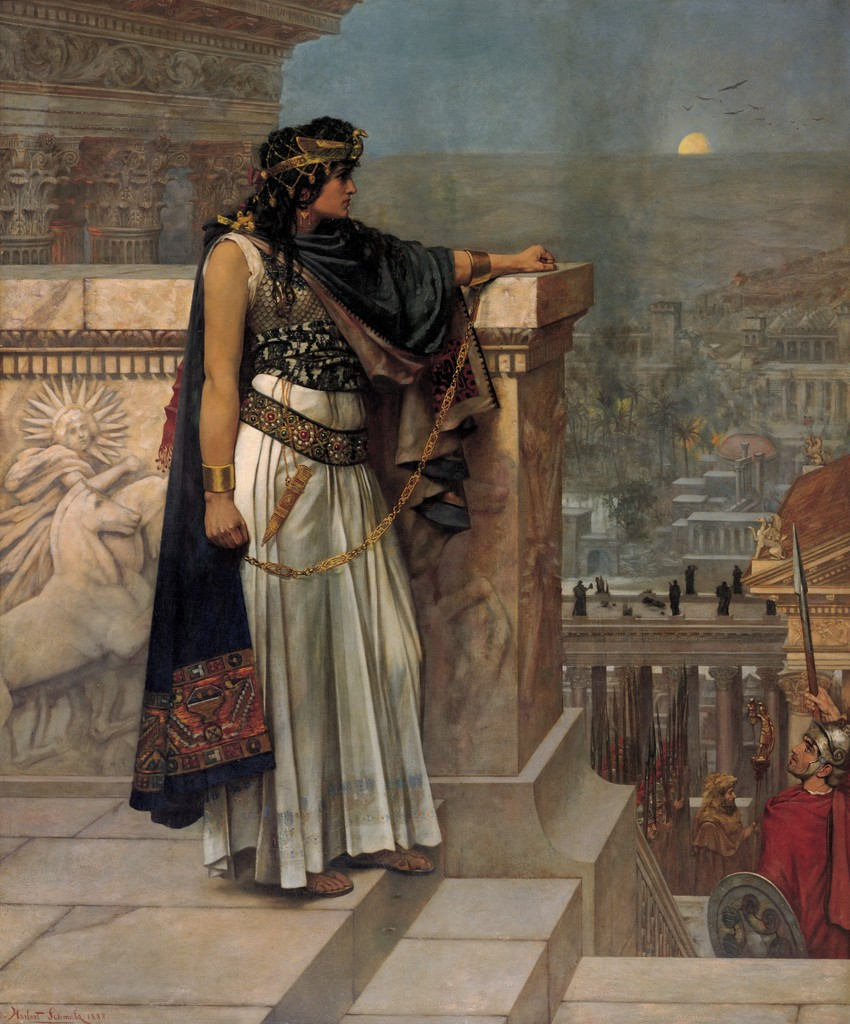
Zenobia's Last Look on Palmyra (1888)

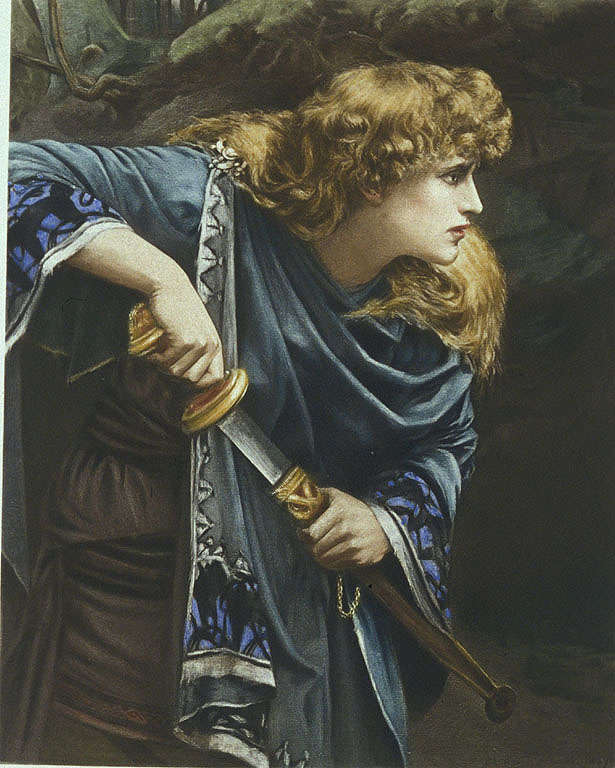
Imogen (1888)

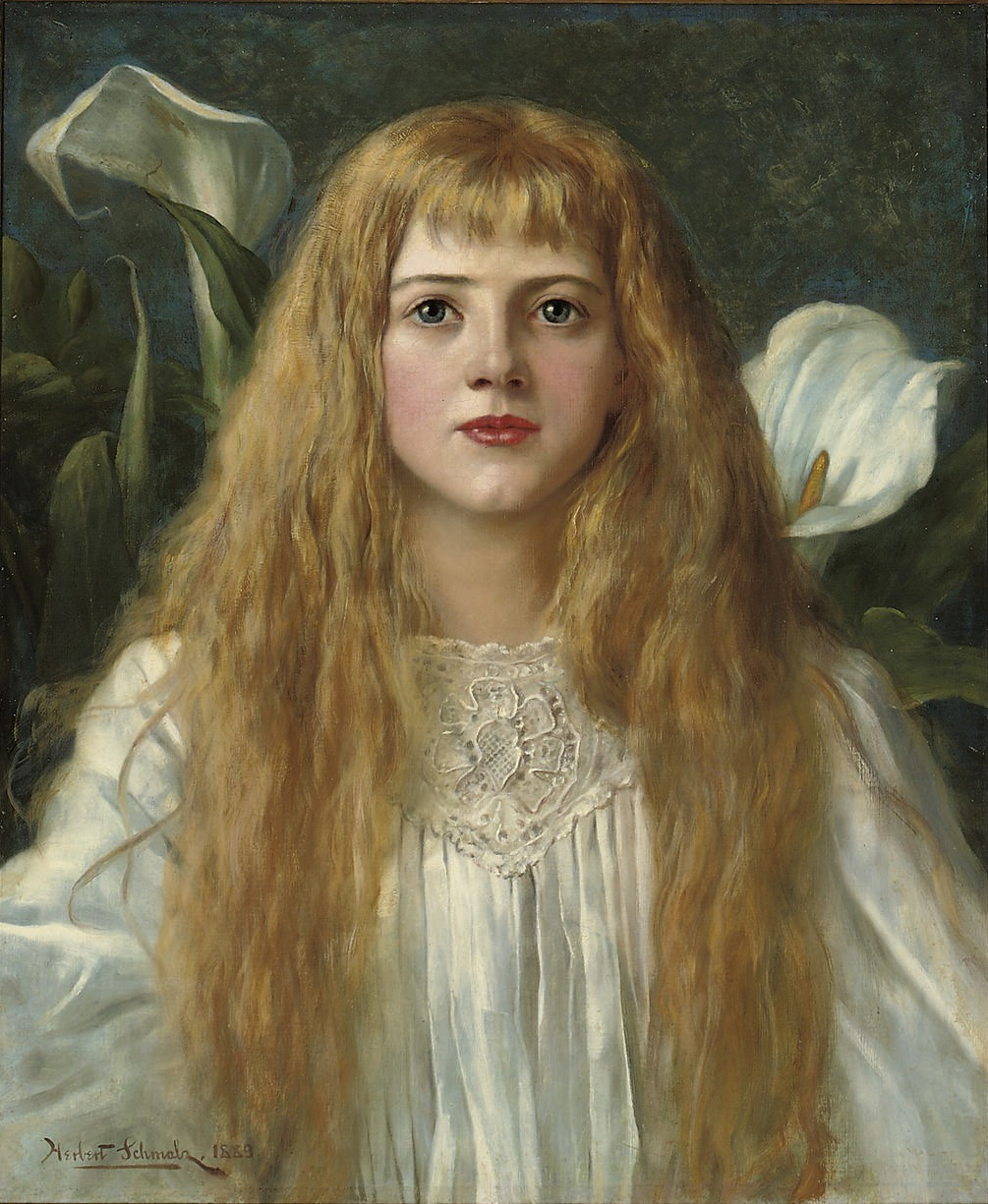
A Fair Beauty (1889)

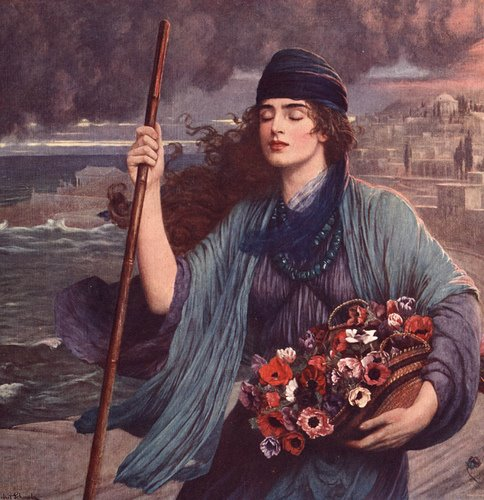
Nydia, the Blind Girl of Pompeii (1890)

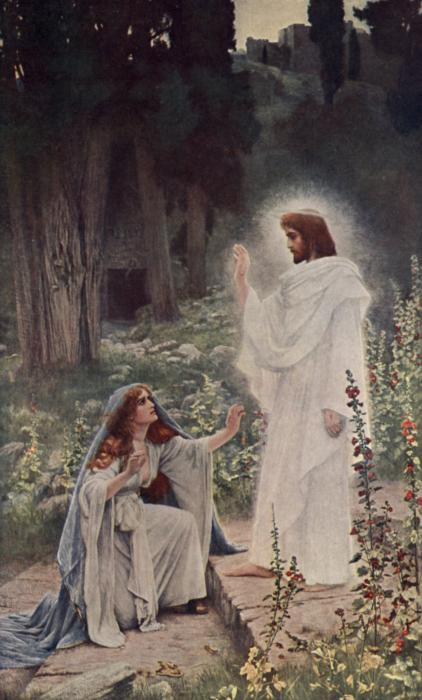
Rabboni (1896)
