= Hairan I =

Co-king of Palmyra from 263 to 267

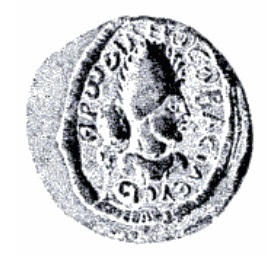
- Tessera depicting Hairan with his Greek name Herodian.

King of Kings of Palmyra
- Reign: 263 – 267
- Predecessor: Odaenathus (as sole king)
- Successor: Vaballathus
- Co-ruler: Odaenathus
- Born: c. 240
- Died: 267
Names
- Septimius Hairan (Herodianus)
- House: House of Odaenathus
- Father: Odaenathus

Septimius Herodianus or Hairan I (Palmyrene Aramaic: 𐡧𐡩𐡴𐡭, romanized: Ḥairan; Arabic: حيران, romanized: Ḥayrān; c. 240 – 267) was a son and co-king of Odaenathus of Palmyra. Through his father's marriage to Zenobia, Hairan I had two half-brothers, Hairan II and Vaballathus.

== Life ==
Hairan was born to Odaenathus and his first wife, whose name is unknown, and he was chosen early in his father's career to be his successor. In 251 he was mentioned in an inscription together with his father as senators and exarchs of Palmyra. Hairan was crowned king by his father; the evidence for the crowning is a dedication found inscribed on a statue base from Palmyra which is undated. However, the dedication was made by Septimius Worod as the duumviri of Palmyra, an office occupied by Worod between 263 and 264. Hence, the coronation took place c. 263. The dedication implied that Hairan defeated a Persian army on the Orontes River.

The inscription celebrating Hairan's coronation called him Herodianus. It is possible that Hairan of the 251 inscription is not the same as Herodianus of the 263 dedication, but this is not accepted by Udo Hartmann who concludes that the reason for the difference in the spelling is due to the language used in the inscription (Herodianus being the Greek version), meaning that Odaenathus' eldest son and co-king was Hairan Herodianus.

Hairan was probably murdered with his father in 267. It is uncertain who murdered them. There are discrepancies in the historical sources regarding the assassination, with many differing accounts as to what happened.

== See also ==
- History of ancient Rome

== Sources ==
- Thorsten Fleck: Das Sonderreich von Palmyra. Seine Geschichte im Spiegel der römischen Münzprägung. In: Geldgeschichtliche Nachrichten 199 (September 2000), pp 245–252.
- Udo Hartmann: Das palmyrenische Teilreich (Oriens et Occidens 2). Stuttgart 2001.
- Ted Kaizer: Odaenathus von Palmyra. In: Michael Sommer (Hg.): Politische Morde. Vom Altertum bis zur Gegenwart. Darmstadt 2005, pp 73–79.
