= Septimius Worod =

3rd-century Palmyrene official and a viceroy for king Odaenathus

Septimius Orodes was a Palmyrene official and a viceroy for king Odaenathus of Palmyra. He was given the surname Septimius by his monarch.

Worod (hellenized as Orodes) is an Iranian name; it is theorized that he was a Parthian refugee in the Palmyrene court (following the destruction of Parthia by the Sassanians) or the head of pro-Persian faction in Palmyra. However, Worod's son's name was Arabic "Ogeilo". Udo Hartmann denied that he was a Parthian insisting that Worod was a Palmyrene noble. Worod held many offices in Palmyra including the administration of justice and public notary.

It is known that Odaenathus sent an embassy to Persia at an unknown date and the ambassador might be Worod. Shapur I of Persia, the enemy of Palmyra, in the inscription named Res Gestae Divi Saporis, lists the names of all the foreign officials who submitted to him; one of them is named Werōy Wāzārbed ("Orodes, Chief of the Bazaar"), a Middle Persian equivalent of Worod. This led to many speculations over his identity; the evidence is non-existent and any connection between the two is a mere speculation.
