= Sextus Anicius Faustus Paulinus =

Sextus Anicius Faustus Paulinus may refer to:

- Sextus Anicius Faustus Paulinus (consul 298), Roman consul in 298
- Sextus Anicius Faustus Paulinus (consul 325), Roman consul in 325
