= Virius Gallus =

Late 3rd-century Roman senator

Virius Gallus was a senator of the Roman Empire who was appointed consul in AD 298.

== Biography ==
A member of the aristocratic gens Viria, Gallus’ early senatorial career is unknown. He was appointed consul posterior alongside Anicius Faustus Paulinus in 298. After his term as consul, Gallus was appointed the Corrector of the region of Campania.

He had not converted to Christianity, and reportedly had a statue of Dionysus to which he made sacrifices.

== Sources ==
- Martindale, John R.; Jones, A. H. M.; Morris, John, eds. (1971). The Prosopography of the Later Roman Empire: Volume I, AD 260–395. Cambridge: Cambridge University Press. ISBN 0-521-07233-6.

Political offices
Preceded by Maximian V Galerius II	Roman consul 298 with Anicius Faustus Paulinus II	Succeeded by Diocletian VII; Maximian VI
