= Diocletian =

Roman emperor from 284 to 305

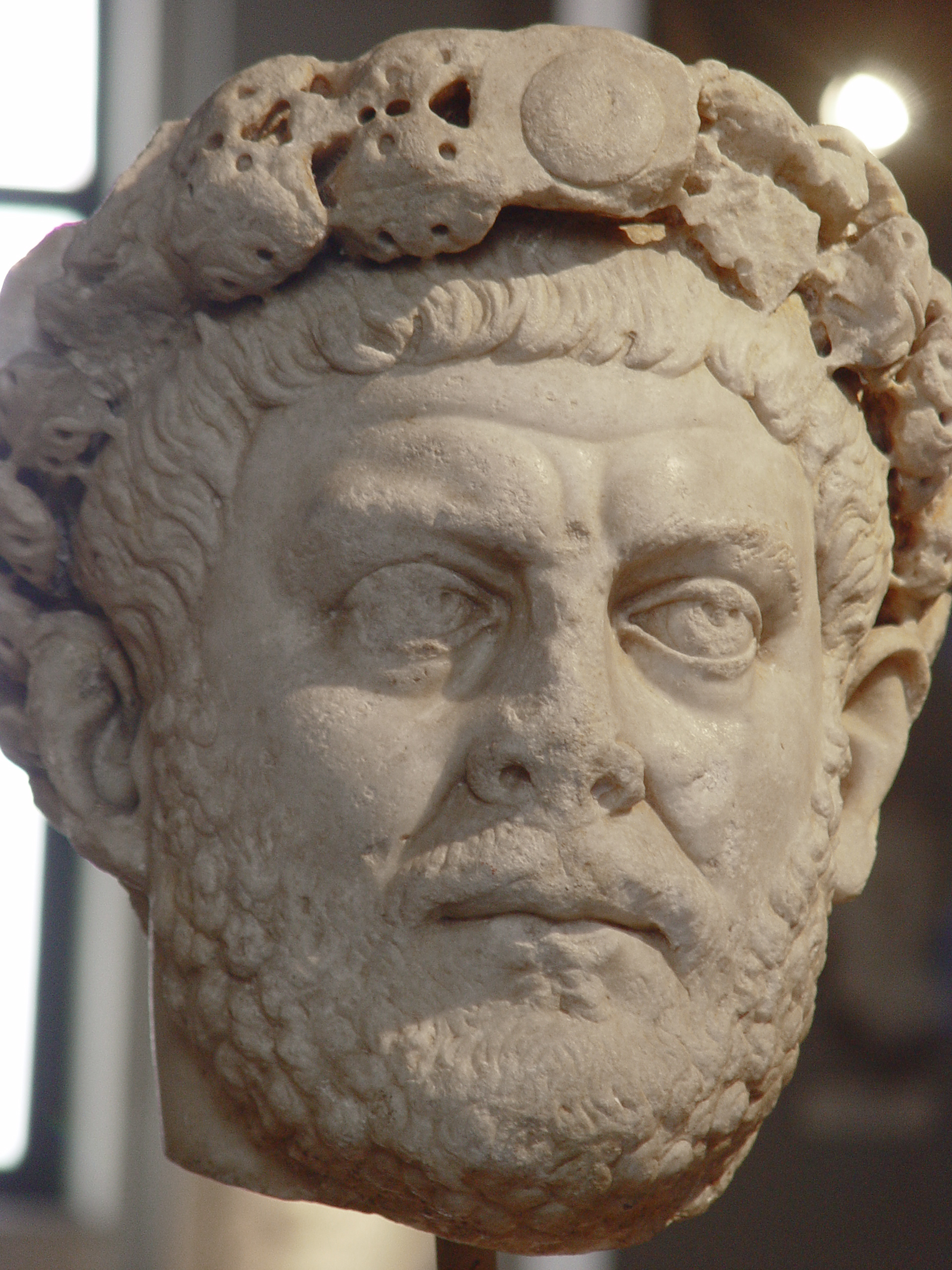
- Head of Diocletian wearing a corona civica, on display at Istanbul Archaeology Museums.

Roman emperor
- Solo-reign; Co-reign: 20 November 284 – 1 April 286; 1 April 286 – 1 May 305 (East)
- Predecessor: Carinus (Note: Contested until July 285.)
- Successor: Galerius (East); Constantius I (West)
- Co-emperor: Maximian (in the West)
- Born: Diocles; 23 December c. 242–243; Salona, Dalmatia, Roman Empire
- Died: 3 December 311/312 (aged c. 68); Aspalathos, Dalmatia, Roman Empire
- Burial: Diocletian's Palace
- Spouse: Prisca
- Issue: Galeria Valeria
Names
- Gaius Valerius Diocles; Gaius Valerius Diocletianus
Regnal name
- Imperator Caesar Gaius Aurelius Valerius Diocletianus Augustus
- Religion: Pontifex maximus of the Roman civil cult

Diocletian (/ˌdaɪ.əˈkliːʃən/ DY-ə-KLEE-shən; Latin: Gaius Aurelius Valerius Diocletianus; Ancient Greek: Διοκλητιανός, romanized: Diokletianós; 242/245 – 311/312), nicknamed Jovius, was Roman emperor from 284 until his abdication in 305. He was born Diocles to a family of low status in the Roman province of Dalmatia. As with other Illyrian soldiers of the period, Diocles rose through the ranks of the military early in his career, serving under Aurelian and Probus, and eventually becoming a cavalry commander for the army of Emperor Carus. After the deaths of Carus and his son Numerian on a campaign in Persia, Diocles was proclaimed emperor by the troops, taking the name "Diocletianus". The title was also claimed by Carus's surviving son, Carinus, but Diocletian defeated him in the Battle of the Margus.

Diocletian's reign stabilized the empire and ended the Crisis of the Third Century. He initiated the process of permanently splitting the Roman Empire, appointing fellow officer Maximian as Augustus, co-emperor, in 286. Maximian ruled the Western Empire, while Diocletian reigned in the Eastern Empire as the senior Augustus. In 293, Diocletian delegated further, appointing Galerius and Constantius as junior colleagues (each with the title Caesar), under himself and Maximian respectively. Under the Tetrarchy, or "rule of four", each tetrarch would rule over a quarter-division of the empire. Diocletian secured the empire's borders and purged it of all threats to his power. He defeated the Sarmatians and Carpi during several campaigns between 285 and 299, the Alamanni in 288, and usurpers in Egypt between 297 and 298. Galerius, aided by Diocletian, campaigned successfully against Persia, the empire's traditional enemy, and in 299, he sacked their capital, Ctesiphon. Diocletian led the subsequent negotiations and achieved a lasting and favorable peace.

Diocletian separated and enlarged the empire's civil and military services and reorganized the empire's provincial divisions, establishing the largest and most bureaucratic government in the history of the empire. He established new administrative centers in Nicomedia, Mediolanum, Sirmium, and Treverorum, closer to the empire's frontiers than the traditional capital at Rome. Building on third-century trends towards absolutism, he styled himself an autocrat, elevating himself above the empire's masses with imposing forms of court ceremonies and architecture. Bureaucratic and military growth, constant campaigning, and construction projects increased the state's expenditures and necessitated a comprehensive tax reform. From at least 297 on, imperial taxation was standardized, made more equitable, and levied at generally higher rates.

Not all of Diocletian's plans were successful: the Edict on Maximum Prices (301), his attempt to curb inflation via price controls, was counterproductive and quickly ignored. Although effective while he ruled, Diocletian's tetrarchic system collapsed after his abdication due to the competing dynastic claims of Maxentius and Constantine, sons of Maximian and Constantius respectively. The Diocletianic Persecution (303–312), the empire's last, largest, and bloodiest official persecution of Christianity, failed to eliminate Christianity in the empire. After 324, Christianity became the empire's preferred religion under Constantine. Despite these failures and challenges, Diocletian's reforms fundamentally changed the structure of the Roman imperial government and helped stabilize the empire economically and militarily, enabling the empire to remain essentially intact for another 150 years despite being near the brink of collapse in Diocletian's youth. Weakened by illness, Diocletian left the imperial office on 1 May 305, becoming the first Roman emperor to abdicate the position voluntarily. He lived out his retirement in his palace on the Dalmatian coast, tending to his vegetable gardens. His palace eventually became the core of the modern-day city of Split in Croatia.

== Early life ==
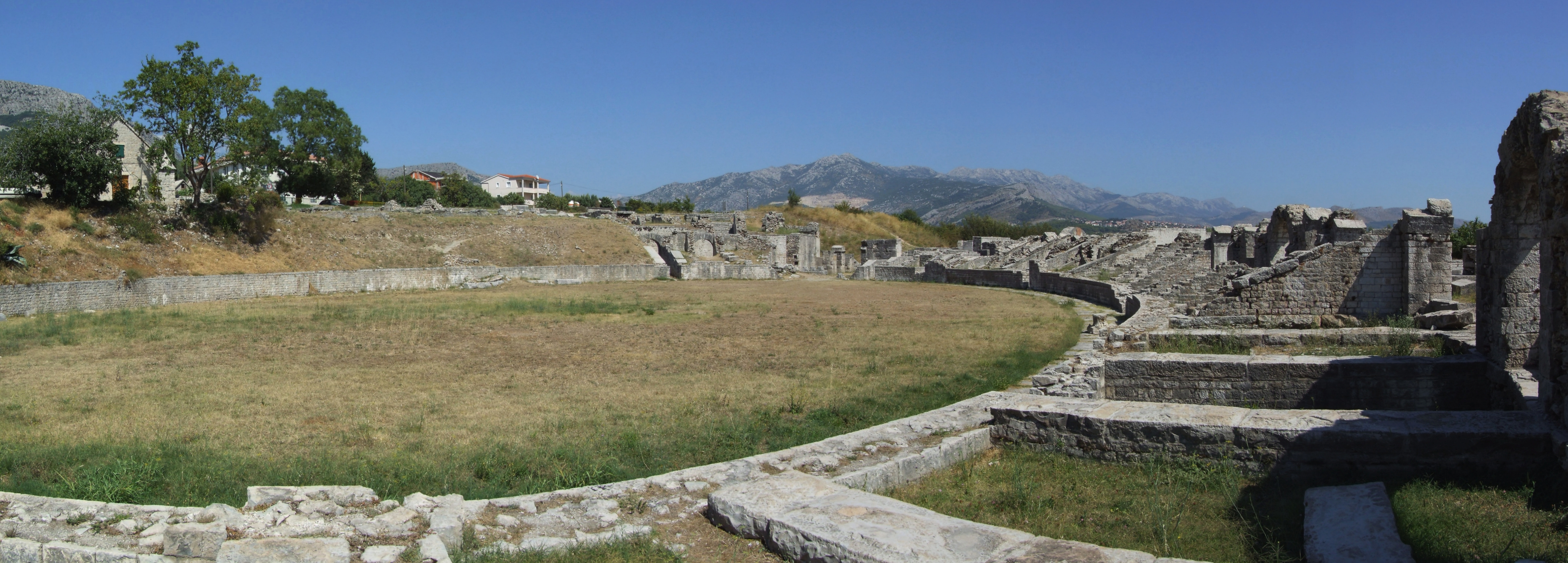
Panorama of amphitheatre in Salona.

Diocletian was born in Dalmatia, probably at or near the town of Salona (modern Solin, Croatia), to which he retired later in life. His original name was Diocles (in full, Gaius Valerius Diocles), possibly derived from Dioclea, the name of both his mother and her supposed place of birth. Diocletian's official birthday was 22 December, and his year of birth has been estimated at between 242 and 245 based on a statement that he was aged 68 at death (his death year is not certain). His parents were of low status; Eutropius records "that he is said by most writers to have been the son of a scribe, but by some to have been a freedman of a senator called Anullinus." The first forty years of his life are mostly obscure. Diocletian was an Illyricianus who served under Aurelian and Probus. According to some scholars Diocles was trained and promoted by Aurelian and Probus, according to other scholars there is no reliable evidence of Diocles's early career. The 12th-century Byzantine chronicler Joannes Zonaras states that he was Dux Moesiae, a commander of forces on the lower Danube. The often-unreliable Historia Augusta states that he served in Gaul, but this is not corroborated by other sources and is ignored by modern historians. The first time Diocletian's whereabouts are accurately established was in 282 when the Emperor Carus made him commander of the Protectores domestici, the elite cavalry force directly attached to the Imperial household. This post earned him the honor of a consulship in 283.

=== Death of Numerian ===
Carus's death, amid a successful war with Persia and in mysterious circumstances – he was believed to have been struck by lightning or killed by Persian soldiers – left his sons Numerian and Carinus as the new Augusti. Carinus quickly made his way to Rome from his post in Gaul and arrived there by January 284, becoming the legitimate Emperor in the West. Numerian lingered in the East. The Roman withdrawal from Persia was orderly and unopposed. The Sassanid king Bahram II could not field an army against them as he was still struggling to establish his authority. By March 284, Numerian had only reached Emesa (Homs) in Syria; by November, only Asia Minor. In Emesa he was apparently still alive and in good health: he issued the only extant rescript in his name there, (Note: Coins were issued in his name in Cyzicus some time before the end of 284, but it is impossible to know whether he was still in the public eye by that point.) but after he left the city, his staff, including the prefect Aper (Numerian's father-in-law and the dominant influence in his entourage), reported that he suffered from an inflammation of the eyes. He traveled in a closed coach from then on. When the army reached Bithynia, some of the soldiers smelled an odor emanating from the coach. They opened its curtains and found Numerian dead. Both Eutropius and Aurelius Victor describe Numerian's death as an assassination.

Aper officially broke the news in Nicomedia (İzmit) in November. Numerian's generals and tribunes called a council for the succession, and chose Diocles as Emperor, in spite of Aper's attempts to garner support. On 20 November 284, the army of the east gathered on a hill 5 kilometres (3.1 mi) outside Nicomedia. The army unanimously saluted Diocles as their new Augustus, and he accepted the purple imperial vestments. He raised his sword to the light of the sun and swore an oath disclaiming responsibility for Numerian's death. He asserted that Aper had killed Numerian and concealed it. In full view of the army, Diocles drew his sword and killed Aper. Soon after Aper's death, Diocles changed his name to the more Latinate "Diocletianus" – in full, Gaius Valerius Diocletianus. (Note: He initially reigned under the name "Marcus Aurelius Gaius Valerius Diocletianus", but this formula didn't last long. He reverted back to "Gaius Valerius Diocles" after his retirement.)

=== Conflict with Carinus ===
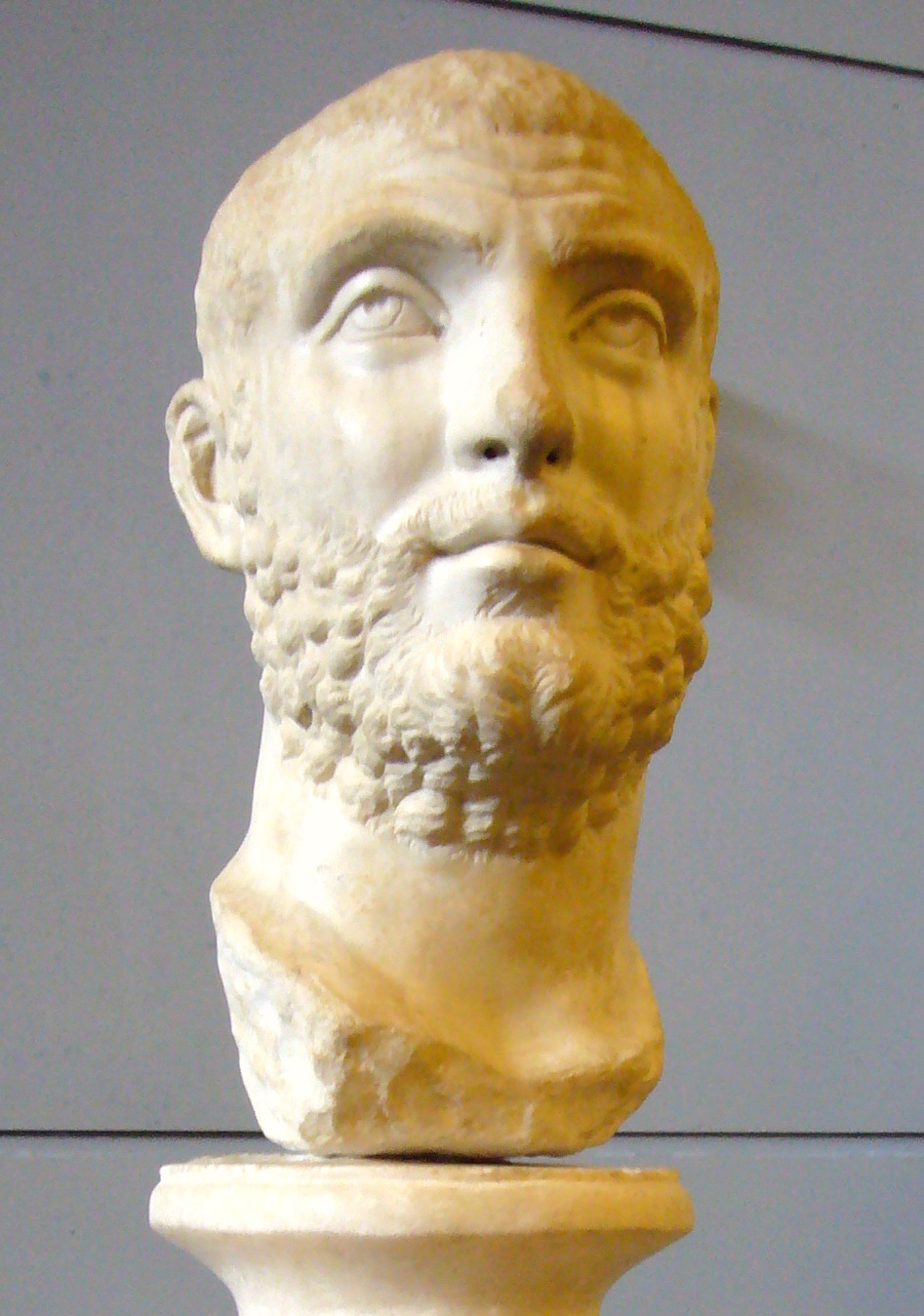
Head of Carinus at the Centrale Montemartini.

After his accession, Diocletian and Lucius Caesonius Bassus were named as consuls and assumed the fasces in place of Carinus and Numerian. Bassus was a member of a senatorial family from Campania, a former consul and proconsul of Africa, chosen by Probus for signal distinction. He was skilled in areas of government where Diocletian presumably had no experience. Diocletian's elevation of Bassus symbolized his rejection of Carinus' government in Rome, his refusal to accept second-tier status to any other emperor, and his willingness to continue the long-standing collaboration between the empire's senatorial and military aristocracies. It also tied his success to that of the Senate, whose support he would need in his advance on Rome.

Diocletian was not the only challenger to Carinus' rule; the usurper Julianus, Carinus' corrector Venetiae, took control of northern Italy and Pannonia after Diocletian's accession. Julianus minted coins from Siscia (Sisak, Croatia) declaring himself emperor and promising freedom. This aided Diocletian in his portrayal of Carinus as a cruel and oppressive tyrant. Julianus' forces were weak, and were handily dispersed when Carinus' armies moved from Britain to northern Italy. As the leader of the united East, Diocletian was clearly the greater threat. Over the winter of 284–85, Diocletian advanced west across the Balkans. In the spring, some time before the end of May, his armies met Carinus' across the river Margus (Great Morava) in Moesia. In modern accounts, the site has been located between the Mons Aureus (Seone, west of Smederevo) and Viminacium, near modern Belgrade, Serbia.

Despite having a stronger, more powerful army, Carinus held the weaker position. His rule was unpopular, and it was later alleged that he had mistreated the Senate and seduced his officers' wives. It is possible that Flavius Constantius, the governor of Dalmatia and Diocletian's associate in the household guard, had already defected to Diocletian in the early spring. When the Battle of the Margus began, Carinus' prefect Aristobulus also defected. In the course of the battle, Carinus was killed by his own men. Following Diocletian's victory, both the western and the eastern armies acclaimed him as Emperor. Diocletian exacted an oath of allegiance from the defeated army and departed for Italy.

== Early rule ==
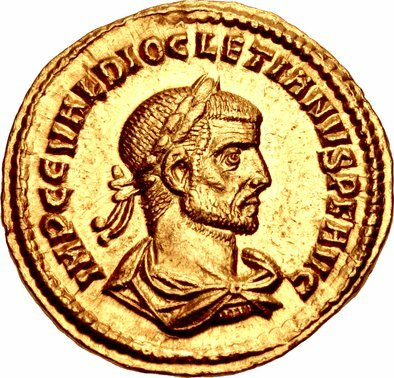
Aureus of Diocletian minted c. 284, legend: imp c c val diocletianus p f aug.

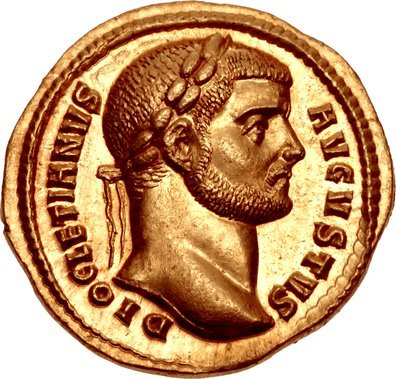
Aureus minted c. 288, after Diocletian's monetary reforms. Legend: diocletianus augustus.

Diocletian may have become involved in battles against the Quadi and Marcomanni immediately after the Battle of the Margus. He eventually made his way to northern Italy and made an imperial government, but it is not known whether he visited Rome at this time. There is a contemporary issue of coins suggestive of an imperial adventus (arrival) for the city, but some modern historians state that Diocletian avoided the city, to demonstrate that the city and its Senate were no longer politically relevant to the affairs of the empire. Diocletian dated his reign from his elevation by the army, not his ratification by the Senate, following the practice established by Carus, who had declared the Senate's ratification a useless formality. Diocletian offered proof of his deference towards the Senate by retaining Aristobulus as ordinary consul and colleague for 285 (one of the few instances during the Late Empire in which an emperor admitted a privatus as his colleague) and by creating senior senators Vettius Aquilinus and Junius Maximus ordinary consuls for the following year – for Maximus, it was his second consulship.

If Diocletian did enter Rome shortly after his accession, he did not stay long; he is attested back in the Balkans by 2 November 285, on campaign against the Sarmatians.

Diocletian replaced the prefect of Rome with his consular colleague Bassus. Most officials who had served under Carinus retained their offices under Diocletian. In an act of clementia denoted by the epitomator of Aurelius Victor as unusual, Diocletian did not kill or depose Carinus's traitorous praetorian prefect and consul Aristobulus, but confirmed him in both roles. He later gave him the proconsulate of Africa and the post of urban prefect for 295. The other figures who retained their offices might have also betrayed Carinus.

=== Maximian made Caesar ===
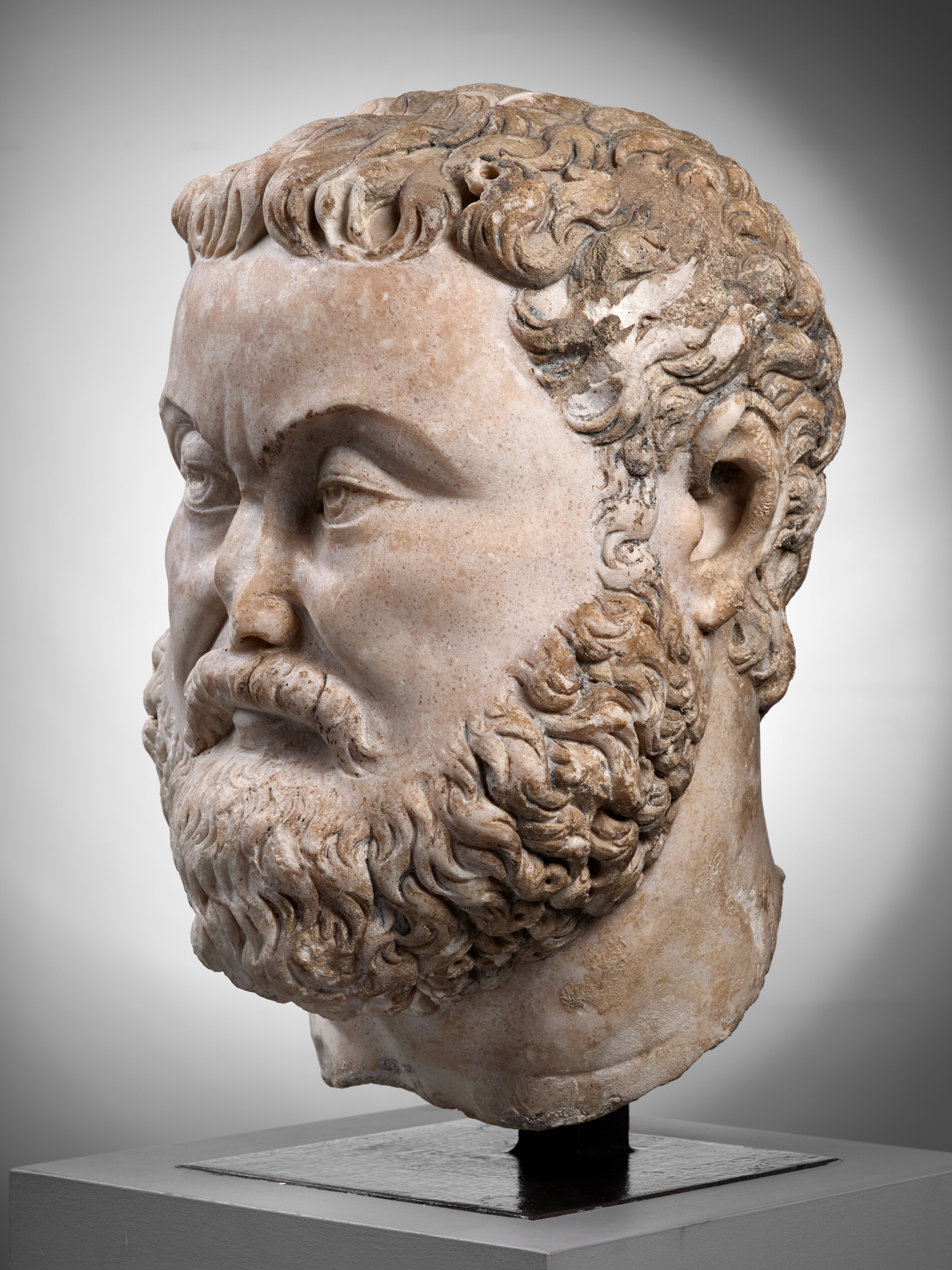
Bust of Maximian, Diocletian's co-ruler in the Western Roman Empire.

The assassinations of Aurelian and Probus demonstrated that sole rulership was dangerous to the stability of the empire. Conflict boiled in every province, from Gaul to Syria, Egypt to the lower Danube. It was too much for one person to control, and Diocletian needed a lieutenant. According to Eutropius, (Note: The chronology of Maximian's appointment as co-ruler is somewhat uncertain. Some argue that Maximian was appointed Augustus without ever holding the office of Caesar. 1 April 286, the date given by the 5th-century Consularia Constantinopolitana, is the most common date used in modern histories for Maximian's dies imperii. A document dated 31 March 286 already shows Diocletian and Maximian as joint emperors. The CAH dates the assumption of the Augustan title to 1 March 286. According to a recent view, Maximian was appointed Augustus (without ever being Caesar) on or around 13 December 285.) Diocletian raised his fellow-officer Maximian to the office of Caesar, making him his heir and effective co-ruler.

The concept of dual rulership was not new to the Roman Empire. Augustus, the first emperor, had nominally shared power with his colleagues, and a formal office of co-emperor (co-Augustus) had existed from Marcus Aurelius onward. Most recently, Carus and his sons had ruled together, albeit unsuccessfully. Dividing the empire in two halves was not new either. An informal division was first tested by Marcus Aurelius and his brother Lucius Verus, who spent most of his reign campaigning in Persia, although he returned West shortly before his death. A more formal division occurred in the joint rule of Valerian/Gallienus and Carus/Carinus. Diocletian would go on to establish new imperial capitals in both West and East; both halves would become independent of each other in the following decades, with only brief moments of unity. Theodosius I, the last sole emperor, only ruled alone for a few months before his death in 395 and the permanent split of the empire.

Diocletian was in a less comfortable position than most of his predecessors, as he had a daughter, Valeria, but no sons. His co-ruler had to be from outside his family, raising the question of trust. Some historians state that Diocletian adopted Maximian as his filius Augusti, his "Augustan son", upon his appointment to the throne, following the precedent of some previous Emperors. This argument has not been universally accepted. Diocletian and Maximian added each other's nomina (their family name, "Valerius" and "Aurelius", respectively) to their own, thus creating an artificial family link and becoming part of the "Aurelius Valerius" family.

The relationship between Diocletian and Maximian was quickly couched in religious terms. Around 287 Diocletian assumed the title Iovius (Jovius), and Maximian assumed the title Herculius (Hercules). The titles were probably meant to convey certain characteristics of their associated leaders. Diocletian, in Jovian style, would take on the dominating roles of planning and commanding; Maximian, in Herculian mode, would act as Jupiter's heroic subordinate. For all their religious connotations, the emperors were not "gods" in the tradition of the Imperial cult – although they may have been hailed as such in Imperial panegyrics. Instead, they were seen as the gods' representatives, effecting their will on earth. The shift from military acclamation to divine sanctification took the power to appoint emperors away from the army. Religious legitimization elevated Diocletian and Maximian above potential rivals in a way military power and dynastic claims could not.

=== Conflict with Sarmatia and Persia ===
After his acclamation, Maximian was dispatched to fight the rebel Bagaudae, insurgent peasants of Gaul. Diocletian returned to the East, progressing slowly. By 2 November, he had only reached Civitas Iovia (Botivo, near Ptuj, Slovenia). In the Balkans during the autumn of 285, he encountered a tribe of Sarmatians who demanded assistance. The Sarmatians requested that Diocletian either help them recover their lost lands or grant them pasturage rights within the empire. Diocletian refused and fought a battle with them, but was unable to secure a complete victory. The nomadic pressures of the European Plain remained and could not be solved by a single war; soon the Sarmatians would have to be fought again.

Diocletian wintered in Nicomedia. (Note: He is placed there by a rescript dated 3 March 286.) There may have been a revolt in the eastern provinces at this time, as he brought settlers from Asia to populate emptied farmlands in Thrace. He visited Syria Palaestina the following spring, (Note: He is attested there in a rescript dated 31 May 287. The Jewish Midrash suggests that Diocletian resided at Panias (present-day Banias) in the northern Golan Heights.) His stay in the East saw diplomatic success in the conflict with Persia: in 287, Bahram II granted him precious gifts, declared open friendship with the Empire, and invited Diocletian to visit him. Roman sources insist that the act was entirely voluntary.

Around the same time, perhaps in 287, Persia relinquished claims on Armenia and recognized Roman authority over territory to the west and south of the Tigris. The western portion of Armenia was incorporated into the empire and made a province. Tiridates III, the Arsacid claimant to the Armenian throne and a Roman client, had been disinherited and forced to take refuge in the empire after the Persian conquest of 252–53. In 287, he returned to lay claim to the eastern half of his ancestral domain and encountered no opposition. Diocletian was hailed as the "founder of eternal peace". The events might have represented a formal end to Carus's eastern campaign, which probably ended without an acknowledged peace. At the conclusion of discussions with the Persians, Diocletian re-organized the Mesopotamian frontier and fortified the city of Circesium (Buseire, Syria) on the Euphrates.

=== Maximian made Augustus ===
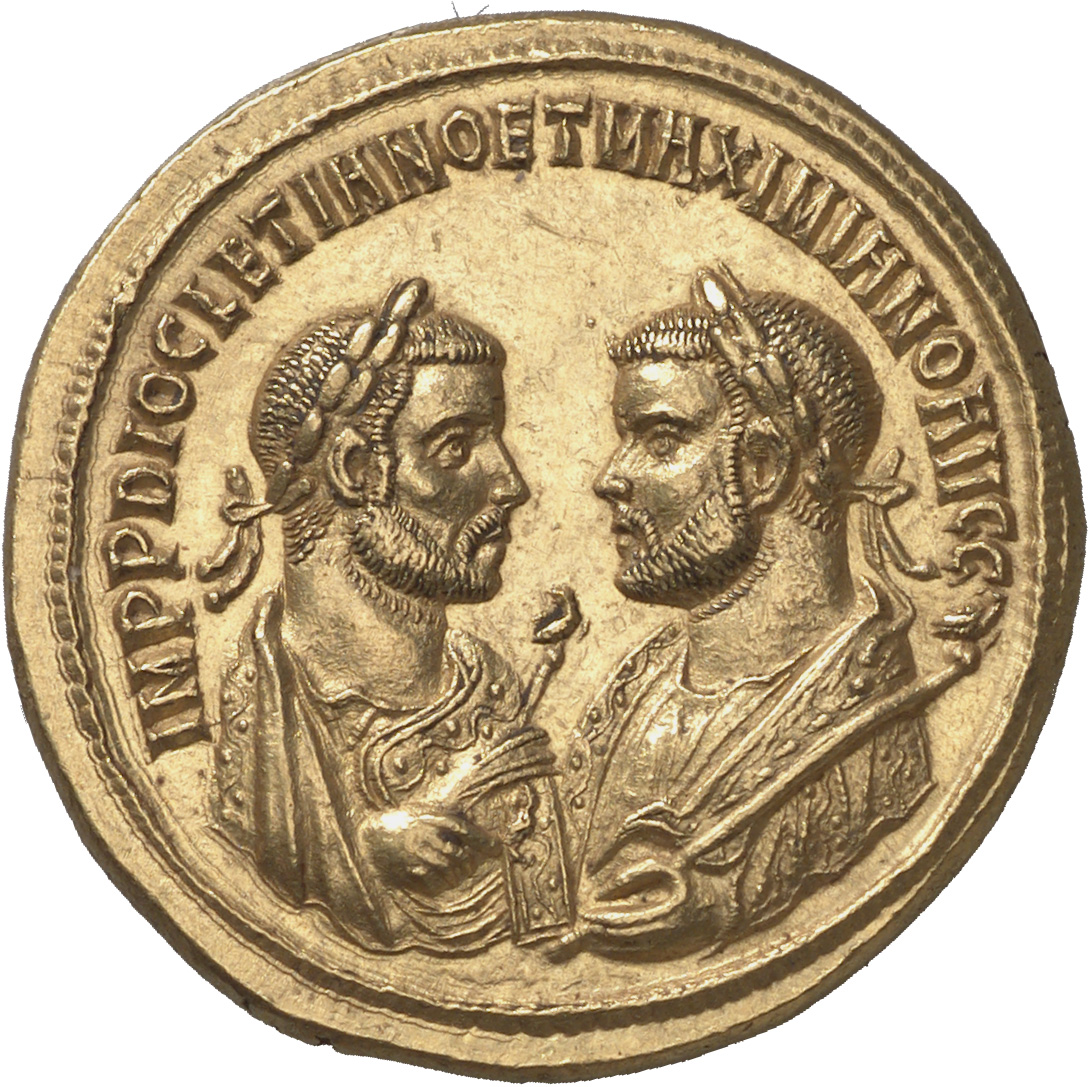
Diocletian and Maximian on a 5 aurei coin from 287, minted in Rome.

Maximian's campaigns were not proceeding as smoothly. The Bagaudae had been easily suppressed, but Carausius, the man he had put in charge of operations against Saxon and Frankish pirates on the Saxon Shore, had, according to literary sources, begun keeping the goods seized from the pirates for himself. Maximian issued a death warrant for his larcenous subordinate. Carausius fled the Continent, proclaimed himself emperor, and agitated Britain and northwestern Gaul into open revolt against Maximian and Diocletian.

Far more probable, according to the archaeological evidence, is that Carausius had held some important military post in Britain, already had a firm basis of power in Britain and Northern Gaul, and profited from the lack of legitimacy of the central government. Carausius strove to have his legitimacy as a junior emperor acknowledged by Diocletian: in his coinage, he extolled the "concord" between him and the central power. One bronze piece from 290 read PAX AVGGG, "the Peace of the three Augusti"; on the other side, it showed Carausius together with Diocletian and Maximian, with the caption CARAVSIVS ET FRATRES SVI, "Carausius & his brothers". Diocletian could not allow a breakaway regional usurper following in Postumus's footprints to enter, of his own accord, the imperial college.

Spurred by the crisis, on 1 April 286, Maximian took up the title of Augustus (emperor). Unusually, Diocletian could not have been present to witness it. It has even been suggested that Maximian usurped the title and was only later recognized by Diocletian in hopes of avoiding civil war. This suggestion is unpopular, as it is clear that Diocletian meant for Maximian to act with a certain amount of independence. It may be posited that Diocletian felt the need to bind Maximian closer to him, by making him his empowered associate, to avoid the possibility of him striking some sort of deal with Carausius.

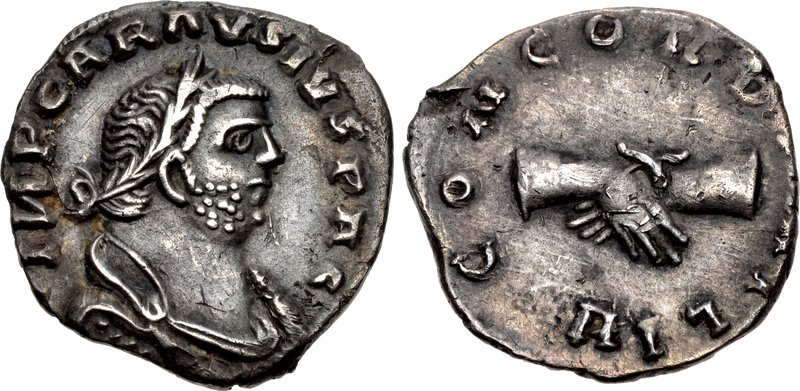
Carausius, rebel emperor of Britain. Most of the evidence for his reign comes from his coinage, which was of generally fine quality.

Maximian realized that he could not immediately suppress the rogue commander, so in 287 he campaigned against tribes beyond the Rhine instead. As Carausius was allied to the Franks, Maximian's campaigns could be seen as an effort to deny him a basis of support on the mainland. The following spring, as Maximian prepared a fleet for an expedition against Carausius, Diocletian returned from the East to meet Maximian. The two emperors agreed on a joint campaign against the Alamanni. Diocletian invaded Germania through Raetia while Maximian progressed from Mainz. Each burned crops and food supplies as he went, destroying the Germans' means of sustenance. The two men added territory to the empire and allowed Maximian to continue preparations against Carausius without further disturbance. On his return to the East, Diocletian managed what was probably another rapid campaign against the resurgent Sarmatians. No details survive, but surviving inscriptions indicate that Diocletian took the title Sarmaticus Maximus after 289, suggesting a successful campaign against the Sarmatians.

In the East, Diocletian engaged in diplomacy with desert tribes in the regions between Rome and Persia. He might have been attempting to persuade them to ally themselves with Rome, thus reviving the old, Rome-friendly, Palmyrene sphere of influence, or to reduce the frequency of their incursions. No details survive for these events. Some of the princes of these states were Persian client kings, a disturbing fact for the Romans in light of increasing tensions with the Sassanids. In the West, Maximian lost the fleet built in 288 and 289, probably in the early spring of 290. The panegyrist who refers to the loss suggests that its cause was a storm, but this might have been an attempt to conceal an embarrassing military defeat. Diocletian broke off his tour of the Eastern provinces soon thereafter. He returned with haste to the West, reaching Emesa by 10 May 290, and Sirmium on the Danube by 1 July 290.

Diocletian met Maximian in Milan either in late December 290 or January 291. The meeting was undertaken with a sense of solemn pageantry. The emperors spent most of their time in public appearances. It has been surmised that the ceremonies were arranged to demonstrate Diocletian's continuing support for his faltering colleague. A deputation from the Roman Senate met with the emperors, renewing its infrequent contact with the Imperial office. The choice of Milan over Rome further snubbed the capital's pride. But then it was already a long-established practice that Rome itself was only a ceremonial capital, as the actual seat of the Imperial administration was determined by the needs of defense. Long before Diocletian, Gallienus (r. 253–68) had chosen Milan for his headquarters. If the panegyric detailing the ceremony implied that the true center of the empire was not Rome, but where the emperor sat ("...the capital of the empire appeared to be there, where the two emperors met"), it simply echoed what had already been stated by the historian Herodian in the early third century: "Rome is where the emperor is". During the meeting, decisions on matters of politics and war were probably made in secret. The Augusti would not meet again until 303.

== Tetrarchy ==
=== Foundation of the Tetrarchy ===
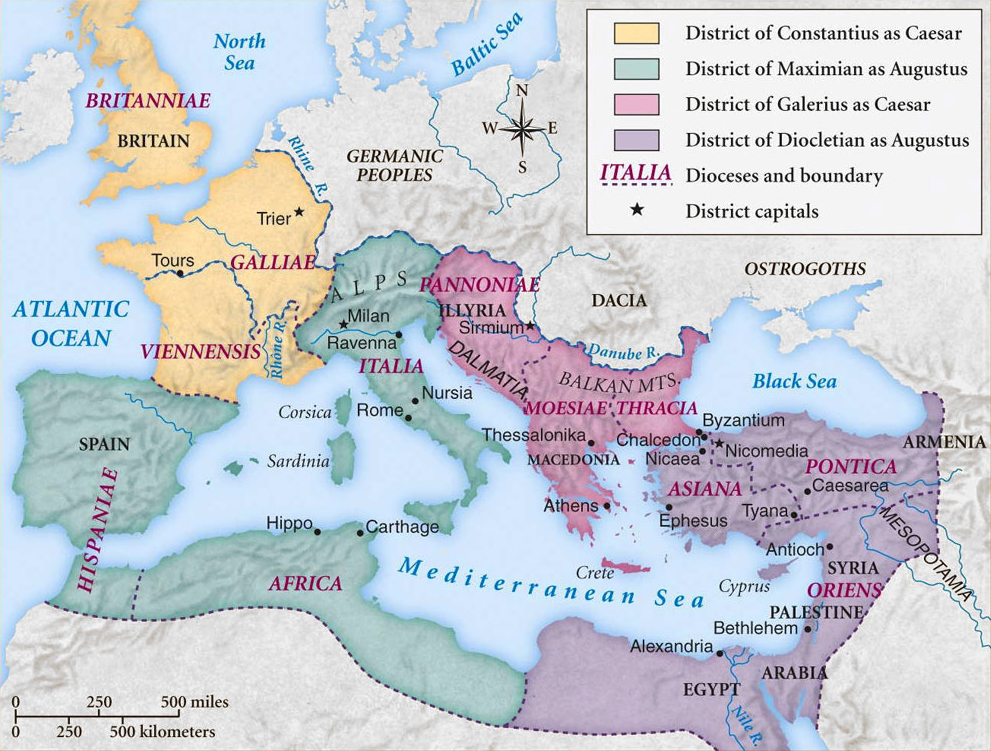
Map of the Tetrarchy in 293, showing the dioceses and the four tetrarchs' zones of influence.

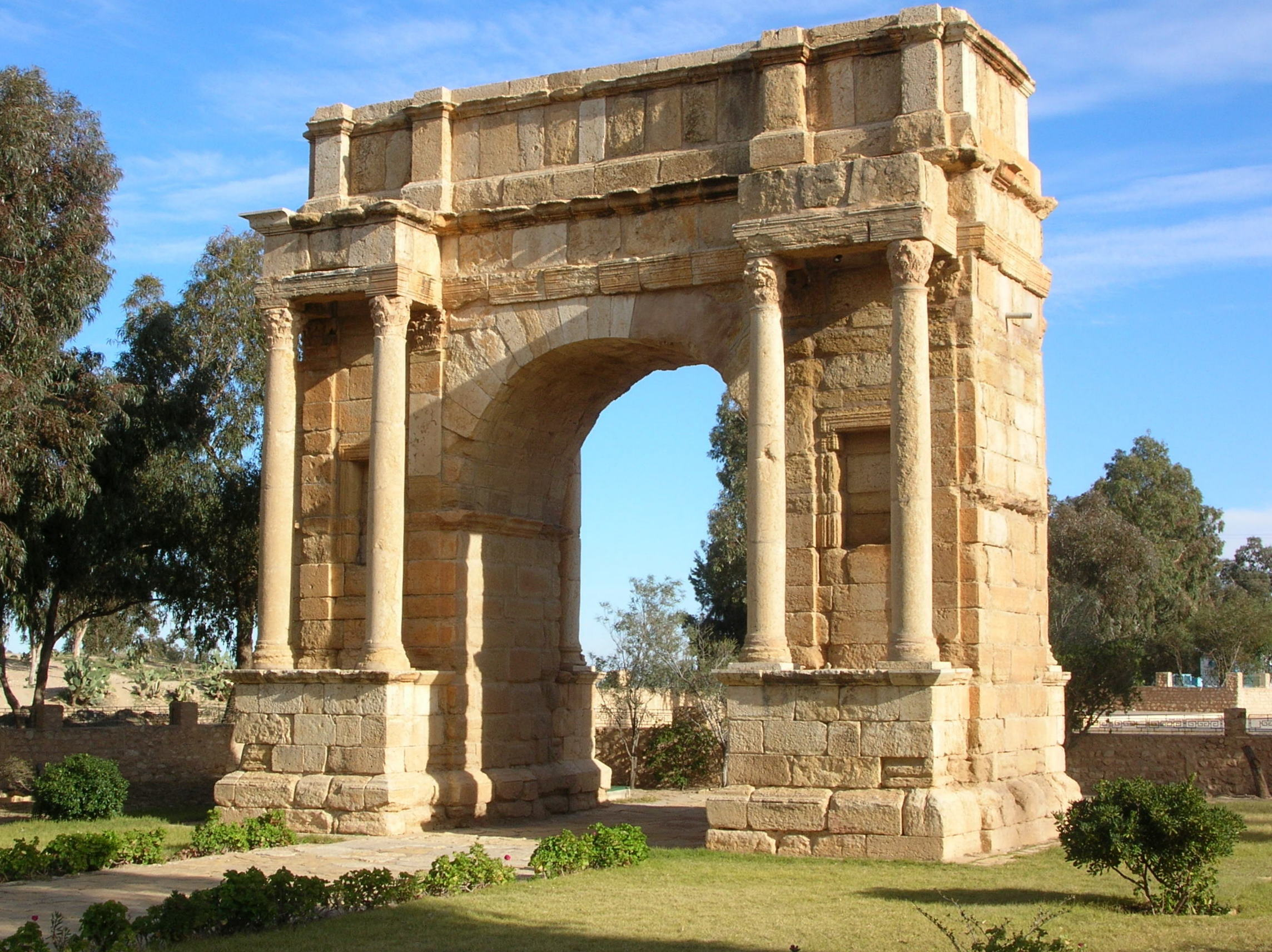
Triumphal arch of the Tetrarchy, Sbeitla, Tunisia.

Some time after his return, and before 293, Diocletian transferred command of the war against Carausius from Maximian to Flavius Constantius, who concluded it successfully in 296. Constantius was a former governor of Dalmatia and a man of military experience stretching back to Aurelian's campaigns against Zenobia (272–73). He was Maximian's praetorian prefect in Gaul, and the husband to Maximian's daughter, Theodora. On 1 March 293 at Milan, Maximian gave Constantius the office of Caesar. The same day, in either Philippopolis (Plovdiv, Bulgaria) or Sirmium, Diocletian did the same for Galerius Maximianus, husband to Diocletian's daughter Valeria, and perhaps Diocletian's praetorian prefect. (Note: The contemporary Lactantius gives 1 March, while the 7th-century Chronicon Paschale gives 21 May. Still, not all authors agree on the exact date.) Constantius was assigned Gaul and Britain. Galerius was initially assigned Syria, Palestine, Egypt, and responsibility for the eastern borderlands.

This arrangement is called the Tetrarchy, from a Greek term meaning "rulership by four". The Tetrarchs were more or less sovereign in their own lands, and they travelled with their own imperial courts, administrators, secretaries, and armies. They were joined by blood and marriage; Diocletian and Maximian now styled themselves as brothers, and formally adopted Galerius and Constantius as sons. These relationships implied a line of succession. Galerius and Constantius would become Augusti after the departure of Diocletian and Maximian. Maximian's son Maxentius and Constantius's son Constantine would then become caesares. In preparation for their future roles, Constantine and Maxentius were taken to Diocletian's court in Nicomedia.

=== Conflict in the Balkans and Egypt ===
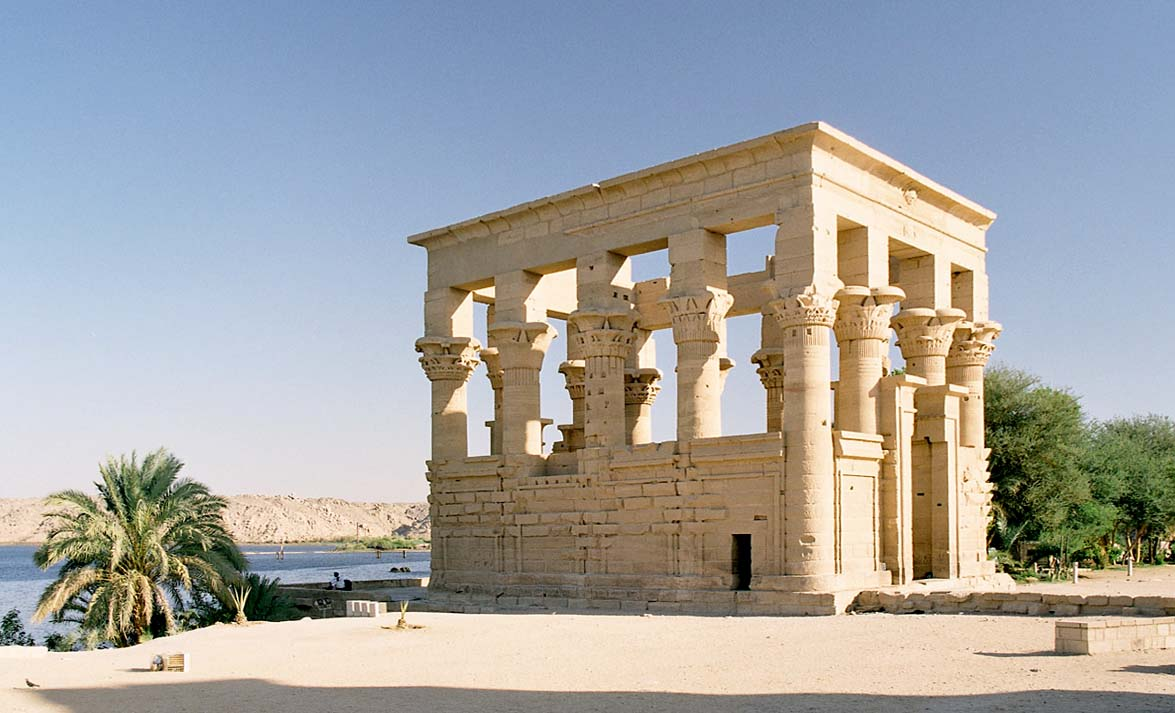
A Trajanic temple on the island of Philae, the newly established border between the Nobatae and Blemmyes and Roman Egypt.

Diocletian spent the spring of 293 travelling with Galerius from Sirmium (Sremska Mitrovica, Serbia) to Byzantium (Istanbul, Turkey). Diocletian then returned to Sirmium, where he remained for the following winter and spring. He campaigned successfully against the Sarmatians in 294, probably in the autumn. The Sarmatians' defeat kept them from the Danube provinces for a long time. Meanwhile, Diocletian built forts north of the Danube, part of a new defensive line called the Ripa Sarmatica, at Aquincum (Budapest, Hungary), Bononia (Vidin, Bulgaria), Ulcisia Vetera, Castra Florentium, Intercisa (Dunaújváros, Hungary), and Onagrinum (Begeč, Serbia). In 295 and 296 Diocletian campaigned in the region again, and won a victory over the Carpi in the summer of 296. Later during both 299 and 302, as Diocletian was residing in the East, it was Galerius's turn to campaign victoriously on the Danube. By the end of his reign, Diocletian had secured the entire length of the Danube, provided it with forts, bridgeheads, highways, and walled towns, and sent fifteen or more legions to patrol the region; an inscription at Sexaginta Prista on the Lower Danube extolled restored tranquility to the region. The defense came at a heavy cost but was a significant achievement in an area difficult to defend.

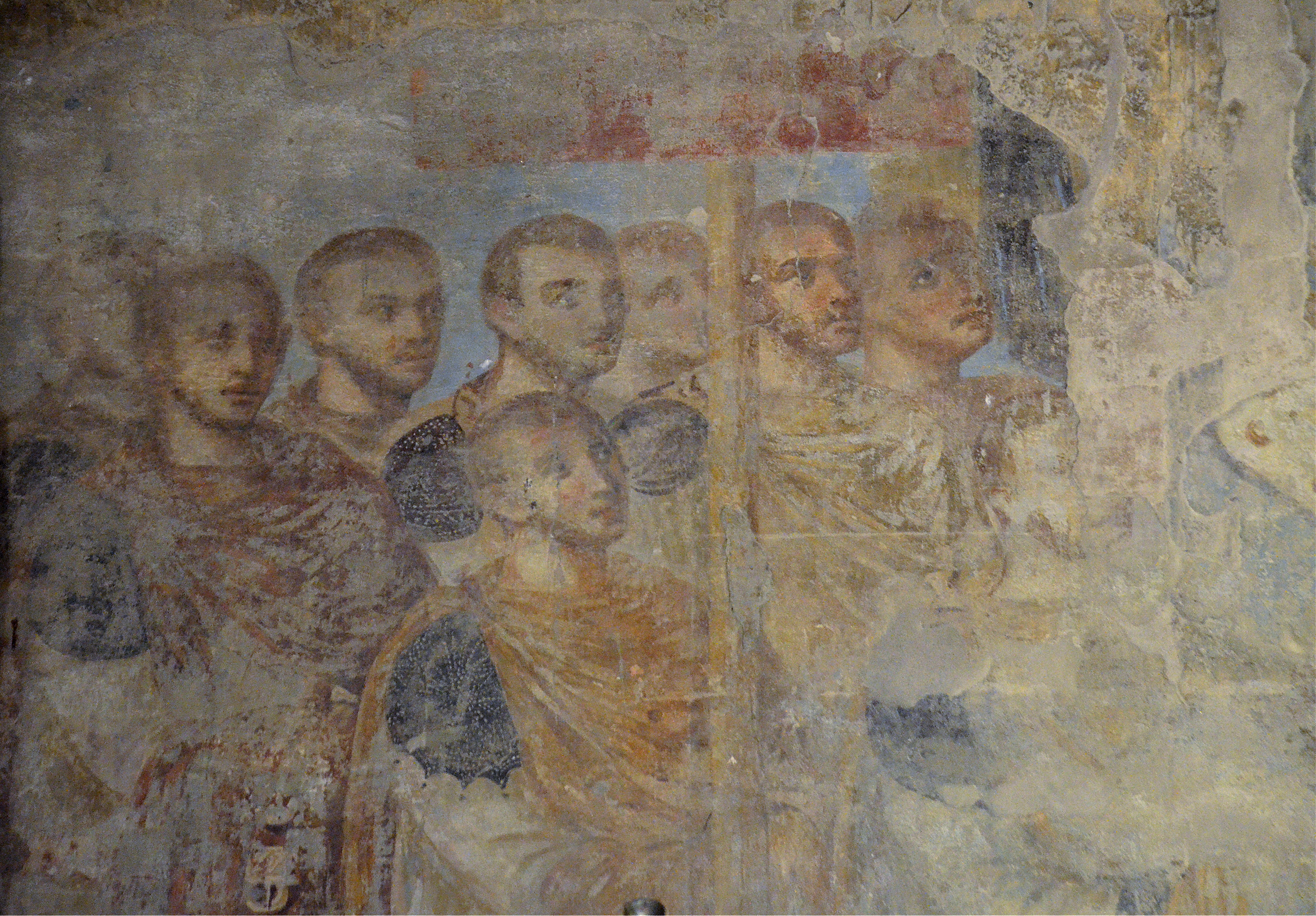
Roman fresco on the southern wall of Luxor Temple's imperial cult chamber. It depicts senior military officers gathered around Diocletian's throne, circa 280.

Galerius, meanwhile, was engaged during 291–293 in disputes in Upper Egypt, where he suppressed a regional uprising. He returned to Syria in 295 to fight the revanchist Persian empire. Diocletian's attempts to bring the Egyptian tax system in line with Imperial standards stirred discontent, and a revolt swept the region after Galerius's departure. The usurper Domitius Domitianus declared himself Augustus in July or August 297. Much of Egypt, including Alexandria, recognized his rule. Diocletian moved into Egypt to suppress him, first putting down rebels in the Thebaid in the autumn of 297, then moving on to besiege Alexandria. Domitianus died in December 297, by which time Diocletian had secured control of the Egyptian countryside. Alexandria, whose defense was organized under Domitianus's former corrector Aurelius Achilleus, held out probably until March 298. Later in 298, the triumphal column now known as Pompey's Pillar was erected in Alexandria to honor Diocletian.

Bureaucratic affairs were completed during Diocletian's stay: a census took place, and Alexandria, in punishment for its rebellion, lost the ability to mint independently. Diocletian's reforms in the region, combined with those of Septimius Severus, brought Egyptian administrative practices much closer to Roman standards. Diocletian prohibited alchemy and ordered all books in Egypt on the subject of turning base metals into gold and silver to be burned; the historian Edward Gibbon wrote "the persecution of Diocletian is the first authentic event in the history of alchymy".

Diocletian travelled south along the Nile the following summer, where he visited Oxyrhynchus and Elephantine. In Nubia, he made peace with the Nobatae and Blemmyes tribes. Under the terms of the peace treaty Rome's borders moved north to Philae and the two tribes received an annual gold stipend. Diocletian left Africa quickly after the treaty, moving from Upper Egypt in September 298 to Syria in February 299. He met with Galerius in Mesopotamia.

=== War with Persia ===
==== Invasion, counterinvasion ====
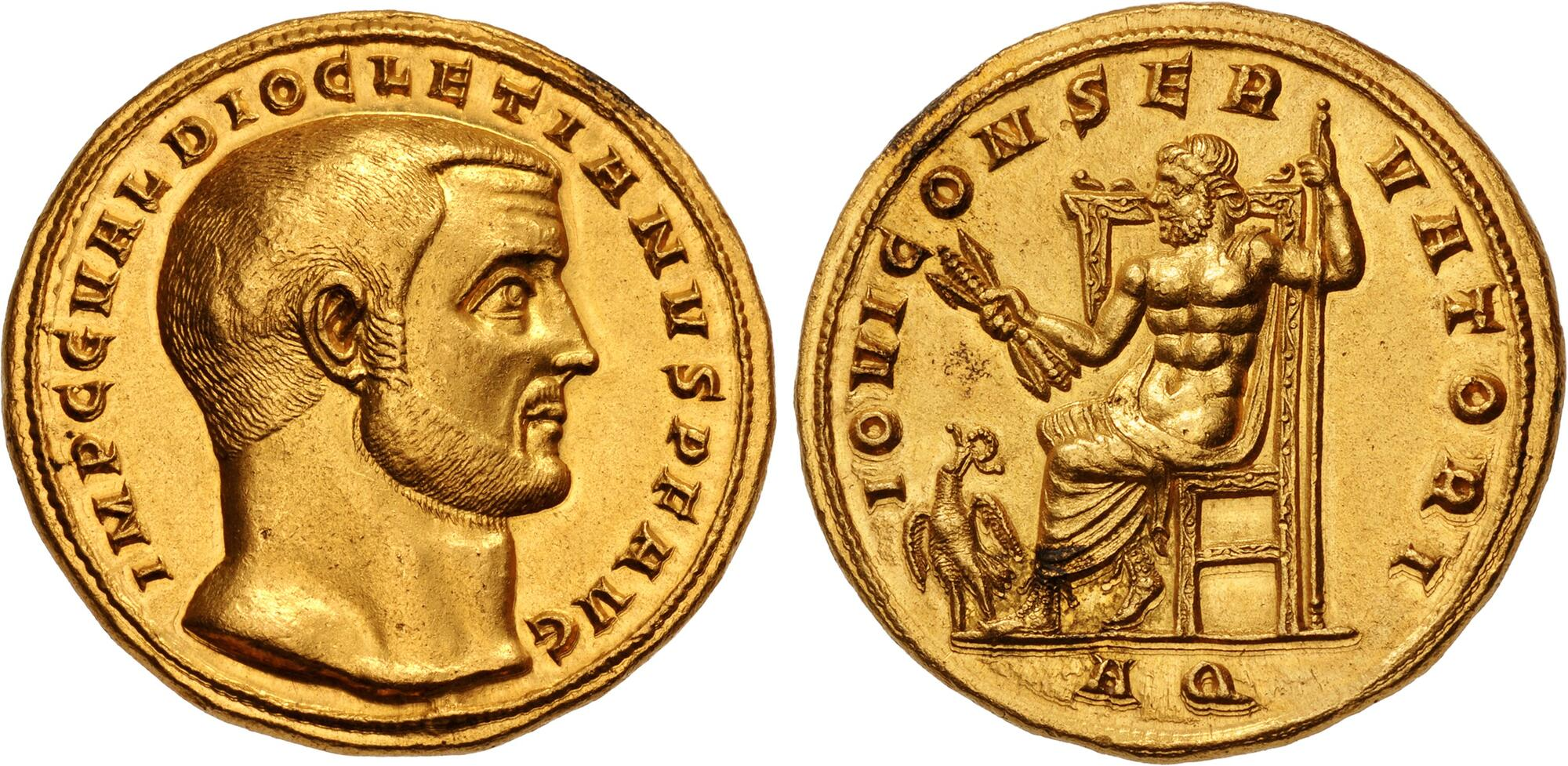
Medallion of Diocletian, AD 294.

In 294, Narseh, a son of Shapur who had been passed over for the Sassanid succession, came to power in Persia. In early 294, Narseh sent Diocletian the customary package of gifts between the empires, and Diocletian responded with an exchange of ambassadors. Within Persia, Narseh was destroying every trace of his immediate predecessors from public monuments. He sought to identify himself with the warlike kings Ardashir I (r. 226–241) and Shapur I (r. 241–272), who had defeated and imprisoned Emperor Valerian (r. 253–260) following his failed invasion of the Sasanian Empire.

Narseh declared war on Rome in 295 or 296. He appears to have first invaded western Armenia, where he seized the lands delivered to Tiridates in the peace of 287. He moved south into Roman Mesopotamia in 297, where he inflicted a severe defeat on Galerius in the region between Carrhae (Harran, Turkey) and Callinicum (Raqqa, Syria), suggested by the historian Fergus Millar to have been somewhere on the Balikh River. Diocletian may or may not have been present at the battle, but he quickly divested himself of all responsibility. In a public ceremony at Antioch, the official version of events was clear: Galerius was responsible for the defeat; Diocletian was not. Diocletian publicly humiliated Galerius, forcing him to walk for a mile at the head of the Imperial caravan, still clad in the purple robes of the Emperor. (Note: It is possible that Galerius's position at the head of the caravan was merely the conventional organization of an imperial progression, designed to show a caesar's deference to his augustus, and not an attempt to humiliate him.)

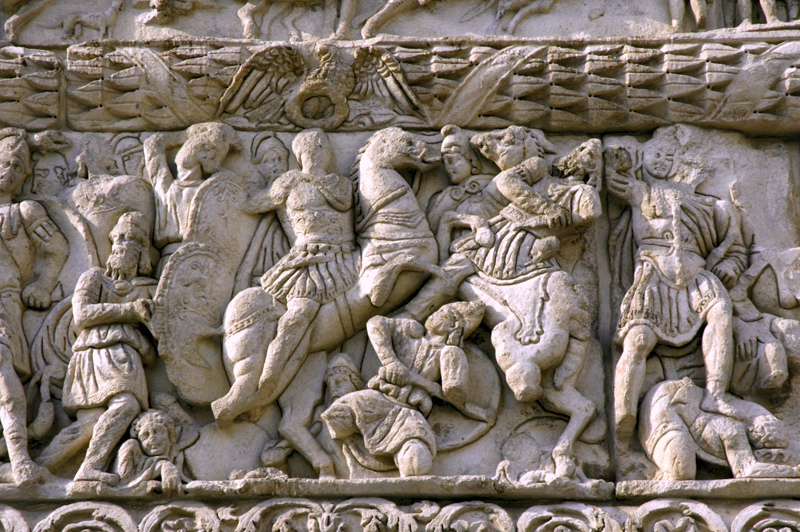
Detail of Galerius attacking Narseh on the Arch of Galerius at Thessaloniki, Greece, the city where Galerius carried out most of his administrative actions.

Galerius was reinforced, probably in the spring of 298, by a new contingent collected from the empire's Danubian holdings. Narseh did not advance from Armenia and Mesopotamia, leaving Galerius to lead the offensive in 298 with an attack on northern Mesopotamia via Armenia. (Note: Faustus of Byzantium's history refers to a battle that took place after Galerius set up base at Satala (Sadak, Turkey) in Armenia Minor, when Narseh advanced from his base at Oskha to attack him.) It is unclear if Diocletian was present to assist the campaign; he might have returned to Egypt or Syria. (Note: Lactantius criticizes Diocletian for his absence from the front, but Southern, dating Diocletian's African campaigns one year earlier than Barnes, places Diocletian on Galerius's southern flank.) Narseh retreated to Armenia to fight Galerius's force, putting himself at a disadvantage; the rugged Armenian terrain was favorable to Roman infantry, but not to Sassanid cavalry. In two battles, Galerius won major victories over Narseh. During the second encounter, Roman forces seized Narseh's camp, his treasury, his harem, and his wife. Galerius continued down the Tigris, and took the Persian capital Ctesiphon before returning to Roman territory along the Euphrates.

==== Peace negotiations ====
Narseh sent an ambassador to Galerius to plead for the return of his wives and children in the course of the war, but Galerius dismissed him. Serious peace negotiations began in the spring of 299. The magister memoriae (secretary) of Diocletian and Galerius, Sicorius Probus, was sent to Narseh to present terms. The conditions of the resulting Peace of Nisibis were heavy: Armenia returned to Roman domination, with the fort of Ziatha as its border; Caucasian Iberia would pay allegiance to Rome under a Roman appointee; Nisibis, now under Roman rule, would become the sole conduit for trade between Persia and Rome; and Rome would exercise control over the five satrapies between the Tigris and Armenia: Ingilene, Sophanene (Sophene), Arzanene (Aghdznik), Corduene (Carduene), and Zabdicene (near modern Hakkâri, Turkey). These regions included the passage of the Tigris through the Anti-Taurus range; the Bitlis pass, the quickest southerly route into Persian Armenia; and access to the Tur Abdin plateau.

A stretch of land containing the later strategic strongholds of Amida (Diyarbakır, Turkey) and Bezabde came under firm Roman military occupation. With these territories, Rome would have an advance station north of Ctesiphon, and would be able to slow any future advance of Persian forces through the region. Many cities east of the Tigris came under Roman control, including Tigranokert, Saird, Martyropolis, Balalesa, Moxos, Daudia, and Arzan – though under what status is unclear. At the conclusion of the peace, Tiridates regained both his throne and the entirety of his ancestral claim. Rome secured a wide zone of cultural influence, which led to a wide diffusion of Syriac Christianity from a center at Nisibis in later decades, and the eventual Christianization of Armenia.

To strengthen the defence of the east Diocletian had a fortified road constructed at the southern border, where the empire bordered the Arabs, in the year 300. This road would remain in use for centuries but proved ineffective in defending the border as conventional armies could not operate in the region.

== Religious persecutions ==
=== Early persecutions ===
At the conclusion of the Peace of Nisibis, Diocletian and Galerius returned to Antioch. At some time in 299, the emperors took part in a ceremony of sacrifice and divination in an attempt to predict the future. The haruspices were unable to read the entrails of the sacrificed animals and blamed Christians in the Imperial household. The emperors ordered all members of the court to perform a sacrifice to purify the palace. The emperors sent letters to the military command, demanding the entire army perform the required sacrifices or face discharge. Diocletian was conservative in matters of religion, faithful to the traditional Roman pantheon and understanding of demands for religious purification, but Eusebius, Lactantius and Constantine state that it was Galerius, not Diocletian, who was the prime supporter of the purge. Galerius, even more devoted and passionate than Diocletian, saw political advantage in the persecution. He was willing to break with a government policy of inaction on the issue.

Antioch was Diocletian's primary residence from 299 to 302, while Galerius swapped places with his Augustus on the Middle and Lower Danube. Diocletian visited Egypt once, over the winter of 301–2, and issued a grain dole in Alexandria. Following some public disputes with Manicheans, Diocletian ordered that the leading followers of Mani be burnt alive along with their scriptures. In a 31 March 302 rescript from Alexandria, he declared that low-status Manicheans must be executed by the blade, and high-status Manicheans must be sent to work in the quarries of Proconnesus (Marmara Island, Turkey) or the mines of Phaeno in southern Palestine. All Manichean property was to be seized and deposited in the imperial treasury. Diocletian found much to be offended by in Manichean religion: its novelty, its alien origins, its perceived corruption of Roman morals, and its inherent opposition to long-standing religious traditions. His reasons for opposing Manichaeanism were also applied to his next target, Christianity.

=== Great Persecution ===
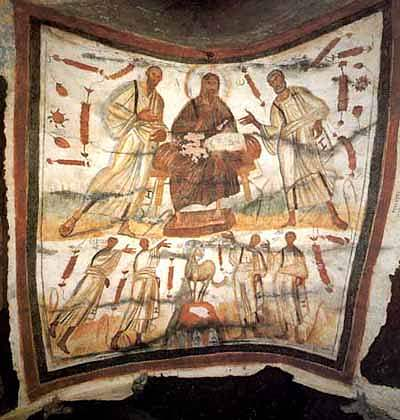
Catacomb of Saints Marcellinus and Peter on the Via Labicana. Christ between Peter and Paul. To the sides are the martyrs Gorgonius, Peter, Marcellinus, Tiburtius.

Diocletian returned to Antioch in the autumn of 302. He ordered that the deacon Romanus of Caesarea have his tongue removed for defying the order of the courts and interrupting official sacrifices. Romanus was then sent to prison, where he was executed on 17 November 303. Diocletian left the city for Nicomedia in the winter, accompanied by Galerius. According to Lactantius, Diocletian and Galerius argued over imperial policy towards Christians while wintering at Nicomedia in 302. Diocletian believed that forbidding Christians from the bureaucracy and military would be sufficient to appease the gods, but Galerius pushed for extermination. The two men sought the advice of the oracle of Apollo at Didyma. The oracle responded that the impious on Earth hindered Apollo's ability to provide advice. Rhetorically Eusebius records the Oracle as saying "The just on Earth..." These impious, Diocletian was informed by members of the court, could only refer to the Christians of the empire. At the behest of his court, Diocletian acceded to demands for universal persecution.

On 23 February 303, Diocletian ordered that the newly built church at Nicomedia be razed. He demanded that its scriptures be burned, and seized its precious stores for the treasury. The next day, Diocletian's first "Edict against the Christians" was published. The edict ordered the destruction of Christian scriptures and places of worship across the empire, and prohibited Christians from assembling for worship. Before the end of February, a fire destroyed part of the Imperial palace. Galerius convinced Diocletian that the culprits were Christians, conspirators who had plotted with the eunuchs of the palace. An investigation was commissioned, but no responsible party was found. Executions followed anyway, and the palace eunuchs Dorotheus and Gorgonius were executed. One individual, Peter Cubicularius, was stripped, raised high, and scourged. Salt and vinegar were poured in his wounds, and he was slowly boiled over an open flame. The executions continued until at least 24 April 303, when six individuals, including the bishop Anthimus, were decapitated. A second fire occurred sixteen days after the first. Galerius left the city for Rome, declaring Nicomedia unsafe. Diocletian would soon follow.

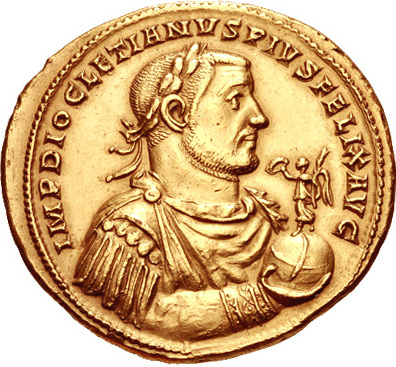
Medallion of Diocletian, c. AD 303.

Although further persecutory edicts followed, compelling the arrest of the Christian clergy and universal acts of sacrifice, they were ultimately unsuccessful; most Christians escaped punishment, and pagans too were generally unsympathetic to the persecution. The martyrs' sufferings strengthened the resolve of their fellow Christians. Constantius and Maximian did not apply the later edicts, and left the Christians of the West unharmed. Galerius rescinded the edict in 311, announcing that the persecution had failed to bring Christians back to traditional religion. The temporary apostasy of some Christians, and the surrendering of scriptures, during the persecution played a major role in the subsequent Donatist controversy. Within twenty-five years of the persecution's inauguration, the Christian emperor Constantine would rule the empire alone. He would reverse the consequences of the edicts, and return all confiscated property to Christians. Under Constantine's rule, Christianity would become the empire's preferred religion. Diocletian was demonized by his Christian successors: Lactantius intimated that Diocletian's ascendancy heralded the apocalypse.

== Later life ==
=== Illness and abdication ===
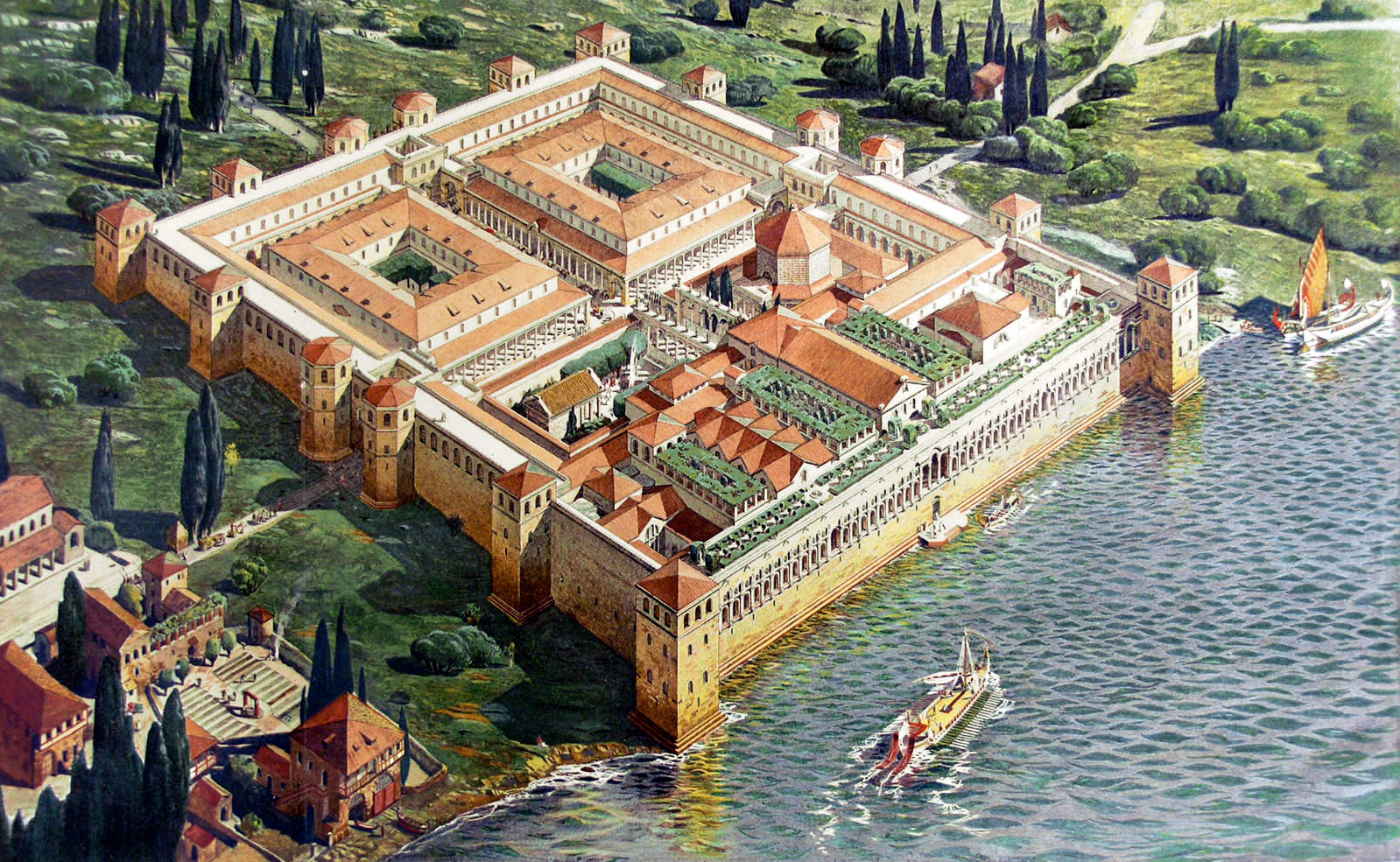
Reconstruction of the Palace of the Roman Emperor Diocletian in its original appearance upon completion in 305, by Ernest Hébrard.

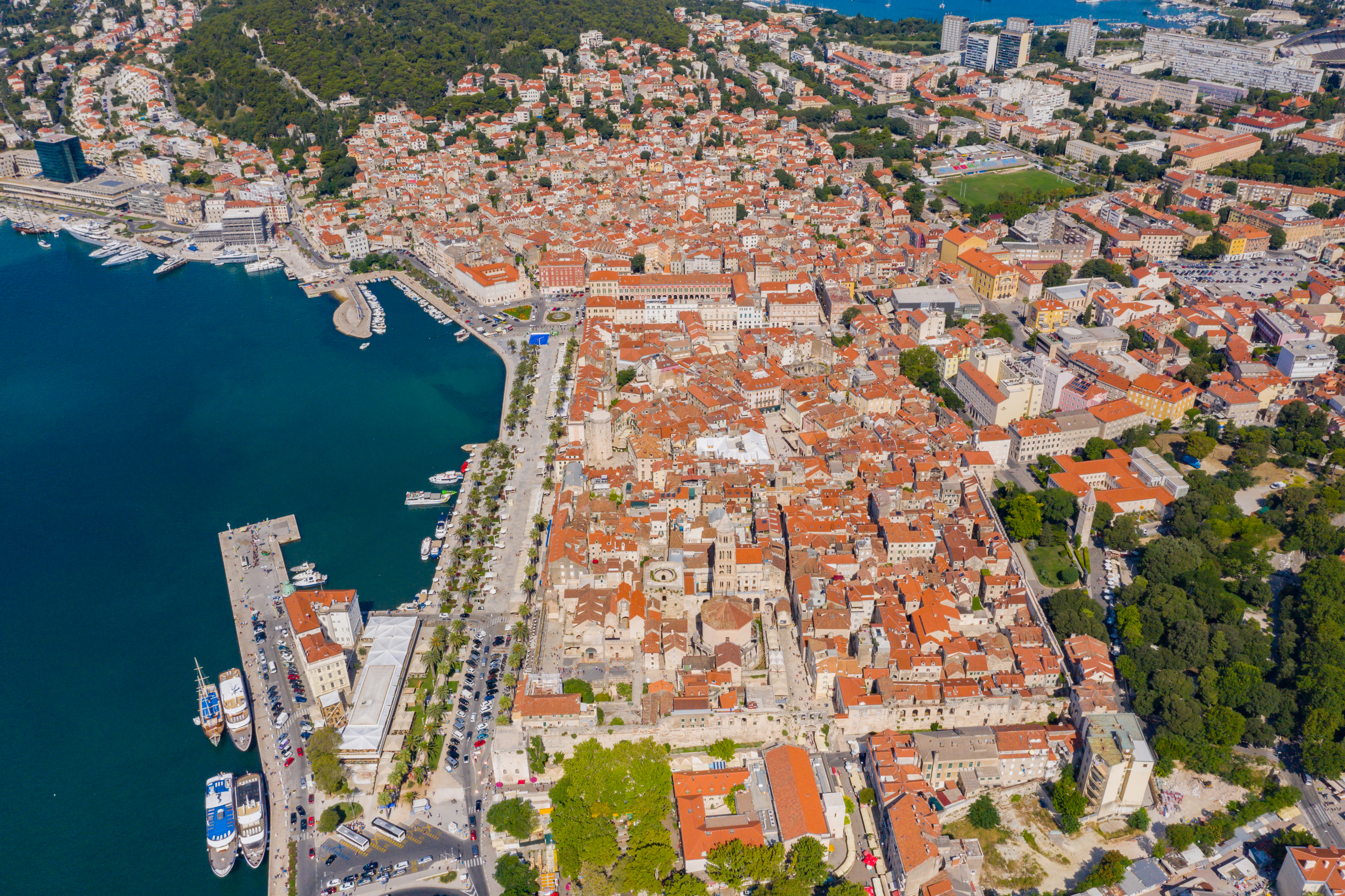
Modern-day Diocletian's Palace, as the core of the city of Split.

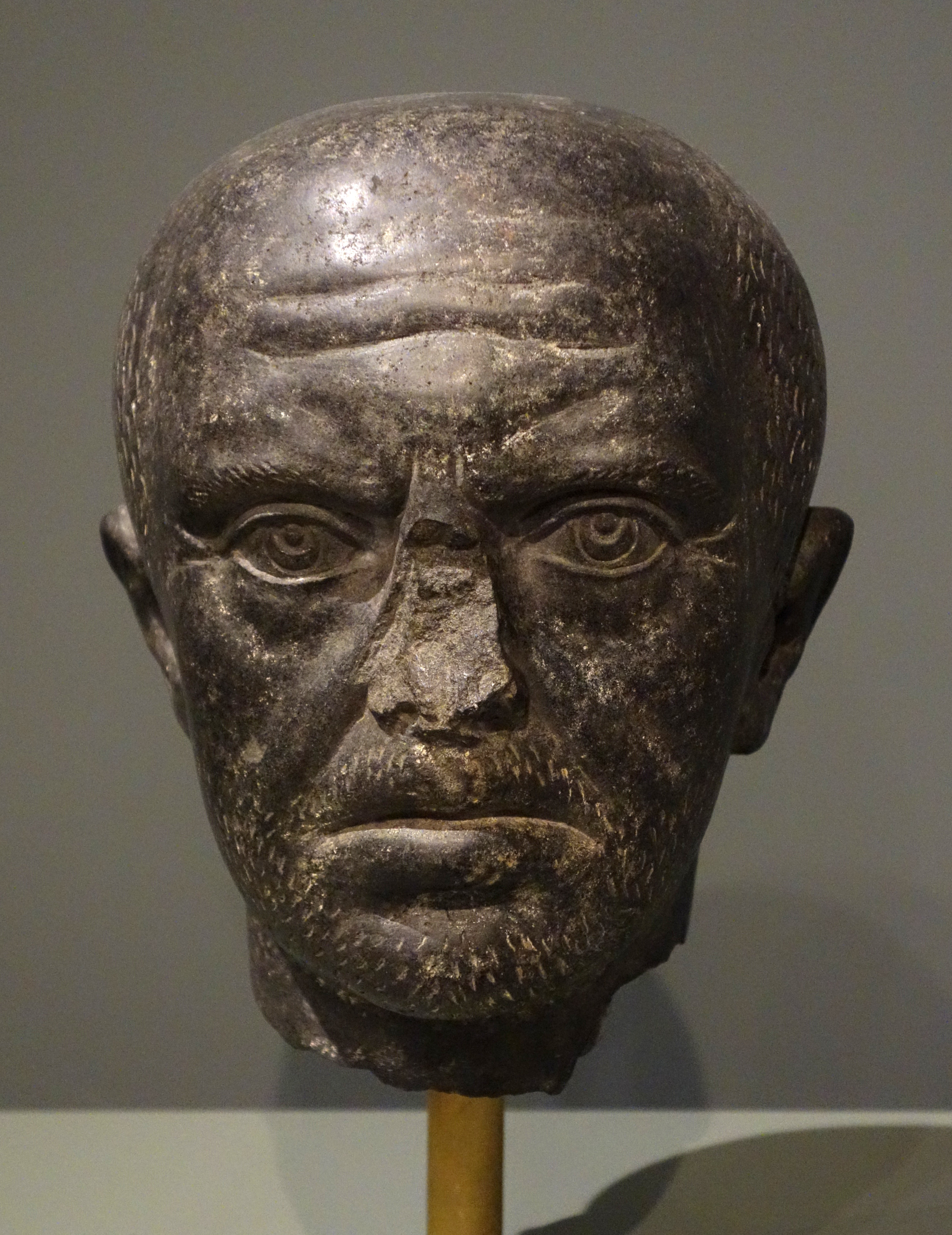
Possible portrait head from around 302–305, made of black basalt, Worcester Art Museum.

Diocletian entered the city of Rome in the early winter of 303. On 20 November, he celebrated, with Maximian, the twentieth anniversary of his reign (vicennalia), the tenth anniversary of the Tetrarchy (decennalia), and a triumph for the war with Persia. This was the last triumph to be held in Rome.

Diocletian soon grew impatient with the city, as the Romans acted towards him with what Edward Gibbon, following Lactantius, calls "licentious familiarity". The Roman people did not give enough deference to his supreme authority; they expected him to act the part of an aristocratic ruler, not a monarchic one. On 20 December 303, Diocletian cut short his stay in Rome and left for the north. He did not even perform the ceremonies investing him with his ninth consulate; he did them in Ravenna on 1 January 304 instead. There are suggestions in the Panegyrici Latini and Lactantius's account that Diocletian arranged plans for his and Maximian's future retirement of power in Rome. Maximian, according to these accounts, swore to uphold Diocletian's plan in a ceremony in the Temple of Jupiter.

From Ravenna, Diocletian left for the Danube. There, possibly in Galerius's company, he took part in a campaign against the Carpi. He contracted a minor illness while on campaign, but his condition quickly worsened and he chose to travel in a litter. In the late summer, he left for Nicomedia. On 20 November 304, he appeared in public to dedicate the opening of the circus beside his palace. He collapsed soon after the ceremonies. Over the winter of 304–05 he kept within his palace at all times. Rumors spread through the city that Diocletian's death was being kept secret until Galerius could assume power. On 13 December, it was falsely announced that Diocletian had killed himself. The city was sent into mourning from which it recovered after public declarations that Diocletian was still alive. When Diocletian reappeared in public on 1 March 305, he was emaciated and barely recognizable.

Galerius arrived in the city later in March. According to Lactantius, he came armed with plans to reconstitute the Tetrarchy, force Diocletian to step down, and fill the Imperial office with men compliant to his will. Through coercion and threats, he eventually convinced Diocletian to comply with his plan. Lactantius also claims that he had done the same to Maximian at Sirmium. Scholars doubt Lactantius' account, since he had a strong bias against Galerius and probably attempted to villainize him. On 1 May 305, Diocletian called an assembly of his generals, traditional companion troops, and representatives from distant legions. They met at the same hill, 5 kilometres (3.1 mi) out of Nicomedia, where Diocletian had been proclaimed emperor. In front of a statue of Jupiter, his patron deity, Diocletian addressed the crowd. With tears in his eyes, he told them of his weakness, his need for rest, and his will to resign. He declared that he needed to pass the duty of empire on to someone stronger. He thus became the first (and arguably only) Roman emperor to voluntarily abdicate his title. (Note: Diocletian almost certainly abdicated because of his advanced age and illness, but he also had a specific succession plan. Maximian was reluctant to abdicate, and later attempted to usurp power twice. Three more emperors abdicated in the later Eastern Empire: Staurakios (r. 811), Michael I (r. 811–813) and Isaac I (r. 1057–59), but all of them were forced to abdicate by a new emperor.)

Most in the crowd believed that Constantine and Maxentius, the only adult sons of reigning emperors, who had long been preparing to succeed their fathers, would be granted the title of Caesar. Constantine had travelled through Palestine at the right hand of Diocletian, and was present at the palace in Nicomedia in 303 and 305. It is likely that Maxentius received the same treatment. In Lactantius's account, when Diocletian announced that he was to resign, the entire crowd turned to face Constantine. It was not to be: Severus II and Maximinus II were declared caesars. Maximinus appeared and took Diocletian's robes. On the same day, Severus received his robes from Maximian in Milan. Constantius succeeded Maximian as Augustus of the West, but Constantine and Maxentius were entirely ignored in the transition of power. This did not bode well for the future security of the tetrarchic system.

=== Retirement and death ===
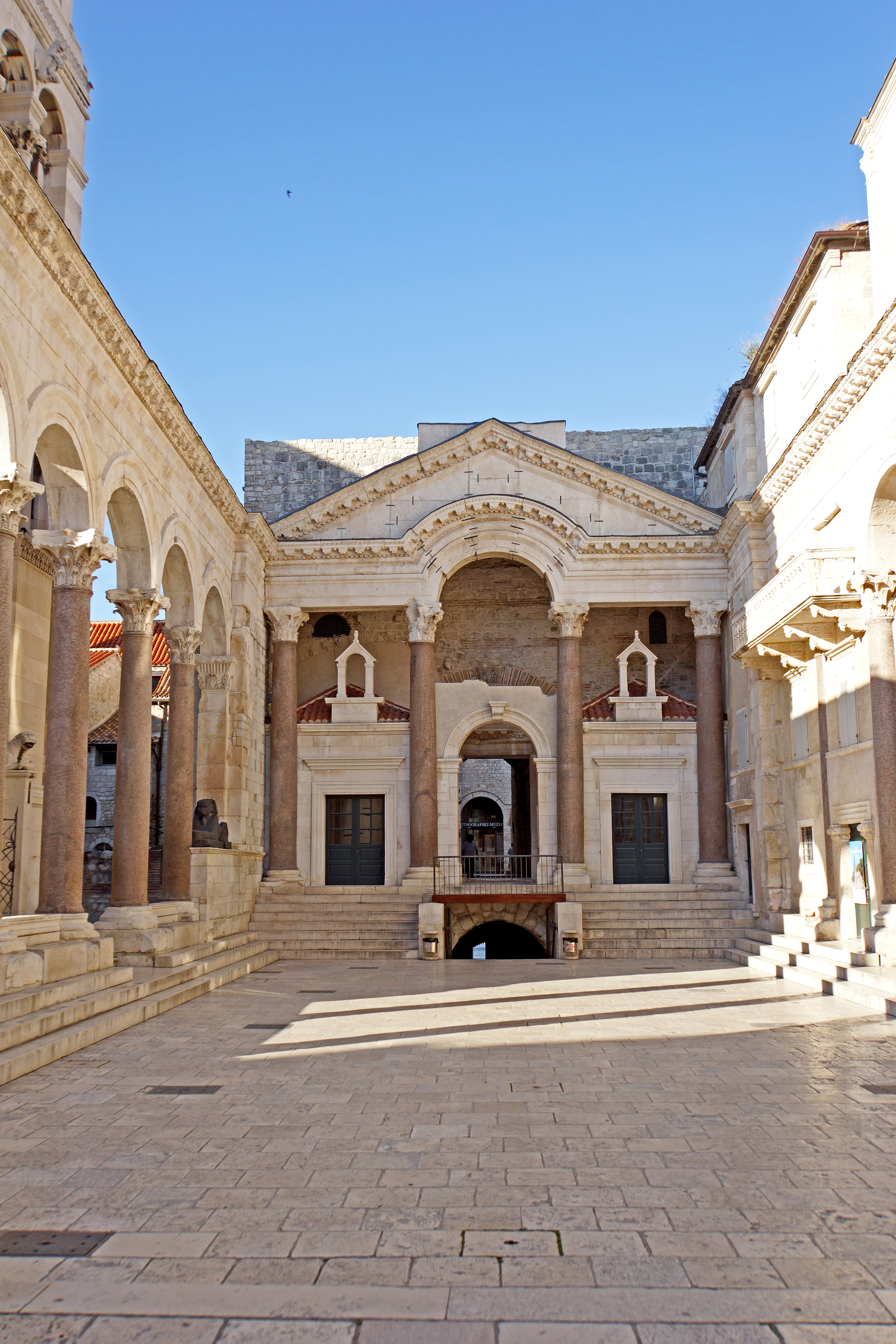
Modern view of the Peristyle in Diocletian's Palace (Split, Croatia).

Diocletian retired to his homeland, Dalmatia. He moved into the expansive Diocletian's Palace, a heavily fortified compound located by the small town of Spalatum on the shores of the Adriatic Sea, and near the large provincial administrative center of Salona. The palace is preserved in great part to this day and forms the historic core of Split, modern-day Croatia, where it was designated a World Heritage Site by UNESCO in 1979.

Maximian retired to villas in Campania or Lucania. Their homes were distant from political life, but Diocletian and Maximian were close enough to remain in regular contact with each other. Galerius assumed the consular fasces in 308 with Diocletian as his colleague. In the autumn of 308, Galerius again conferred with Diocletian at Carnuntum (Petronell-Carnuntum, Austria). Diocletian and Maximian were both present on 11 November 308, to see Galerius appoint Licinius to be Augustus in place of Severus, who had died at the hands of Maxentius. He ordered Maximian, who had attempted to return to power after his retirement, to step down permanently. At Carnuntum people begged Diocletian to return to the throne, to resolve the conflicts that had arisen through Constantine's rise to power and Maxentius's usurpation. Diocletian's reply: "If you could see the cabbages I have planted here with my own hands, you surely would never have thought to request this."

Diocletian lived for four more years, spending his days in his palace gardens. He saw his tetrarchic system fail, torn apart by the civil wars of his successors. He heard of Maximian's third claim to the throne, his forced suicide, and his damnatio memoriae. In his own palace, statues and portraits of his former companion emperor were torn down and destroyed. After an illness, Diocletian died on 3 December 311 (or 312). (Note: The range of dates proposed for Diocletian's death have stretched from 311 through to 318. Until recently, the date of 3 December 311 has been favored; the absence of Diocletian on Maxentius's AETERNA MEMORIA coins could indicate that he was alive through to Maxentius's defeat in October 312. Given that Diocletian had died by the time of Maximin Daia's death in July 313, it has been argued that the correct date of death was 3 December 312.) Some have speculated that he took his own life in despair, but Edward Gibbon wrote that this was "very doubtful".

In 311, his wife Prisca and their daughter Valeria had their property confiscated and were exiled to Syria after Valeria refused the emperor Maximinus Daza's marriage proposal. In 315 they were both executed by Licinius.

== Reforms ==
=== Tetrarchic and ideological ===
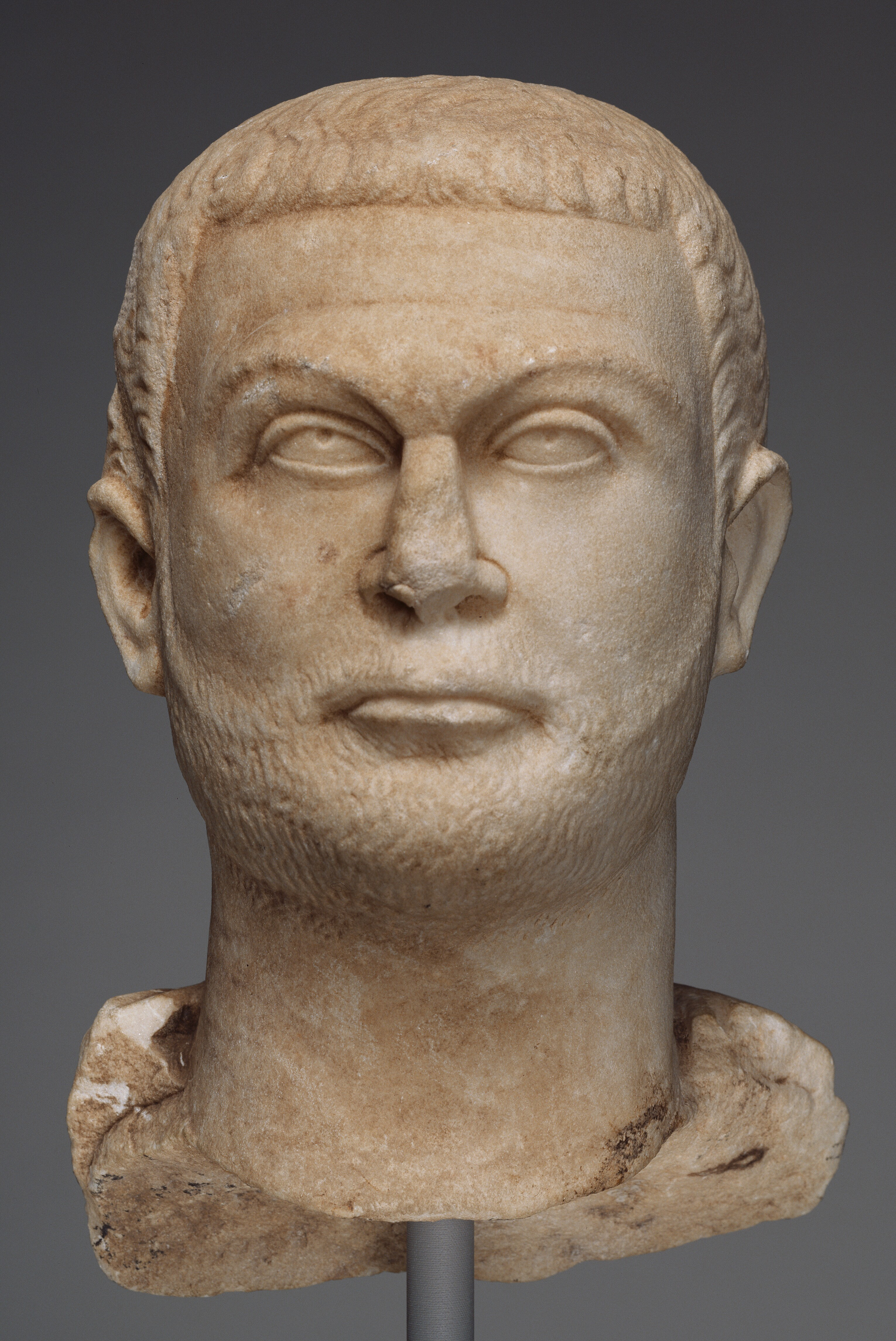
Head of Diocletian in the Getty Museum, late 3rd century.

Diocletian saw his work as that of a restorer, a figure of authority whose duty it was to return the empire to peace, to recreate stability and justice where barbarian hordes had destroyed it. He arrogated, regimented and centralized political authority on a massive scale. In his policies, he enforced an Imperial system of values on diverse and often unreceptive provincial audiences. In the Imperial propaganda from the period, recent history was perverted and minimized in the service of the theme of the tetrarchs as "restorers". Aurelian's achievements were ignored, the revolt of Carausius was backdated to the reign of Gallienus, and it was implied that the tetrarchs engineered Aurelian's defeat of the Palmyrenes; the period between Gallienus and Diocletian was effectively erased. The history of the empire before the tetrarchy was portrayed as a time of civil war, savage despotism, and imperial collapse. In those inscriptions that bear their names, Diocletian, the "founder of eternal peace", and his companions are referred to as "restorers of the whole world", men who succeeded in "defeating the nations of the barbarians, and confirming the tranquility of their world". The theme of restoration was conjoined to an emphasis on the uniqueness and accomplishments of the tetrarchs themselves.

The cities where emperors lived frequently in this period – Milan, Trier, Arles, Sirmium, Serdica, Thessaloniki, Nicomedia and Antioch – were treated as alternate imperial seats, to the exclusion of Rome and its senatorial elite. A new style of ceremony was developed, emphasizing the distinction of the emperor from all other persons. The quasi-republican ideals of Augustus's primus inter pares were abandoned for all but the tetrarchs themselves. Diocletian took to wearing a gold crown and jewels, and forbade the use of purple cloth to all but the emperors. His subjects were required to prostrate themselves in his presence (adoratio); the most fortunate were allowed the privilege of kissing the hem of his robe (proskynesis, προσκύνησις). Circuses and basilicas were designed to keep the face of the emperor perpetually in view, and always in a seat of authority. The emperor became a figure of transcendent authority, a man beyond the grip of the masses. His every appearance was stage-managed. This style of presentation was not new – many of its elements were first seen in the reigns of Aurelian and Severus – but it was only under the tetrarchs that it was refined into an explicit system.

=== Administrative ===
==== Central authorities ====
In keeping with his move from an ideology of republicanism to one of autocracy, Diocletian's council of advisers, his consilium, differed from those of earlier emperors. He destroyed the Augustan illusion of imperial government as a cooperative affair among emperor, army, and senate. In its place he established an effectively autocratic structure, a shift later epitomized in the institution's name: it would be called a consistorium, not a council. (Note: The term consistorium was already in use for the room where council meetings took place.) Diocletian regulated his court by distinguishing separate departments (scrinia) for different tasks. From this structure came the offices of different magistri, like the magister officiorum ("Master of Offices"), and associated secretariats. These were men suited to dealing with petitions, requests, correspondence, legal affairs, and foreign embassies. Within his court Diocletian maintained a permanent body of legal advisers, men with significant influence on his re-ordering of juridical affairs. There were also two finance ministers, dealing with the separate bodies of the public treasury and the private domains of the emperor, and the praetorian prefect, the most significant person of the whole. Diocletian's reduction of the Praetorian Guards to the level of a simple city garrison for Rome lessened the military powers of the prefect – although a prefect like Asclepiodotus was still a trained general – but the office retained much civil authority. The prefect kept a staff of hundreds and managed affairs in all segments of government: in taxation, administration, jurisprudence, and minor military commands, the praetorian prefect was often second only to the emperor himself.

==== Civil service and military officials ====
Altogether, Diocletian greatly increased the number of bureaucrats at the government's command; Lactantius claimed that there were now more men using tax money than there were paying it. The historian Warren Treadgold estimates that under Diocletian the number of men in the civil service doubled from 15,000 to 30,000. The classicist Roger S. Bagnall estimates that there was one bureaucrat for every 5–10,000 people in Egypt based on 400 or 800 bureaucrats for 4 million inhabitants. (Note: No one knows the population of the province in 300 AD; Strabo, 300 years earlier, put it at 7.5 million, excluding Alexandria. By comparison, the ratio in 12th-century Song dynasty China was one bureaucrat for every 15,000 people.) Jones estimated 30,000 bureaucrats, which he remarks is "not an extravagant number" given the size of the empire. He breaks down the bureaucracy as less than 12,000 provincial officials, and roughly 6,000 diocesan officials. For the military, he estimates a modest 300 officials per magister militum, and 40 per dux, for a total of about 5,000 military officials. For the praetorian prefect and urban prefect, he estimates approximately 5,000 clerks. He comments that the expense the empire paid for these was not high, as many lower-level clerks were not paid, and the wage of higher officials was generally modest.

==== Territorial units and their administration ====
To avoid the possibility of local usurpations, to facilitate a more efficient collection of taxes and supplies, and to ease the enforcement of the law, Diocletian doubled the number of provinces from fifty to almost one hundred. The provinces were grouped into twelve dioceses, each governed by an appointed official called a vicarius, or "deputy of the praetorian prefects". Some of the provincial divisions required revision, and were modified either soon after 293 or early in the fourth century. Rome herself (including her environs, as defined by a 100-mile (160 km)-radius perimeter around the city itself) was not under the authority of the praetorian prefect, as she was to be administered by a city prefect of senatorial rank – the sole prestigious post with actual power reserved exclusively for senators, except for some governors in Italy with the titles of corrector and the proconsuls of Asia and Africa.

The dissemination of imperial law to the provinces was facilitated by Diocletian's reform of the Empire's provincial structure, which meant that there were now more governors (praesides) ruling over smaller regions and smaller populations. Diocletian's reforms shifted the governors' main function to that of the presiding official in the lower courts: whereas in the early Empire military and judicial functions were the function of the governor, and procurators had supervised taxation, under the new system vicarii and governors were responsible for justice and taxation, and a new class of duces ("dukes"), acting independently of the civil service, had military command. These dukes sometimes administered two or three of the new provinces created by Diocletian, and had forces ranging from two thousand to more than twenty thousand men. In addition to their roles as judges and tax collectors, governors were expected to maintain the postal service (cursus publicus) and ensure that town councils fulfilled their duties.

This curtailment of governors' powers as the Emperors' representatives may have lessened the political dangers of an all-too-powerful class of Imperial delegates, but it also severely limited governors' ability to oppose local landed elites, especially those of senatorial status, which, although with reduced opportunities for office holding, retained wealth, social prestige, and personal connections, particularly in relatively peaceful regions without a great military presence. On one occasion, Diocletian had to exhort a proconsul of Africa not to fear the consequences of treading on the toes of the local magnates of senatorial rank. If a governor of senatorial rank himself felt these pressures, the difficulties faced by a mere praeses were likely greater. This led to a strained relationship between the central power and local elites: sometime during 303, attempted military sedition in Seleucia Pieria and Antioch prompted Diocletian to extract bloody retribution on both cities by putting to death a number of their council members for failing in their duties of keeping order in their jurisdiction.

Boundary markers

During his reign, a series of inscribed boundary stones were erected in the Levant to mark village lands and clarify fiscal responsibilities as part of his administrative reforms. These so-called "Diocletian boundary stones" are concentrated in the Hula Valley and Golan regions and preserve otherwise unattested village names, providing rare evidence for the local impact of imperial taxation policies.

=== Legal ===
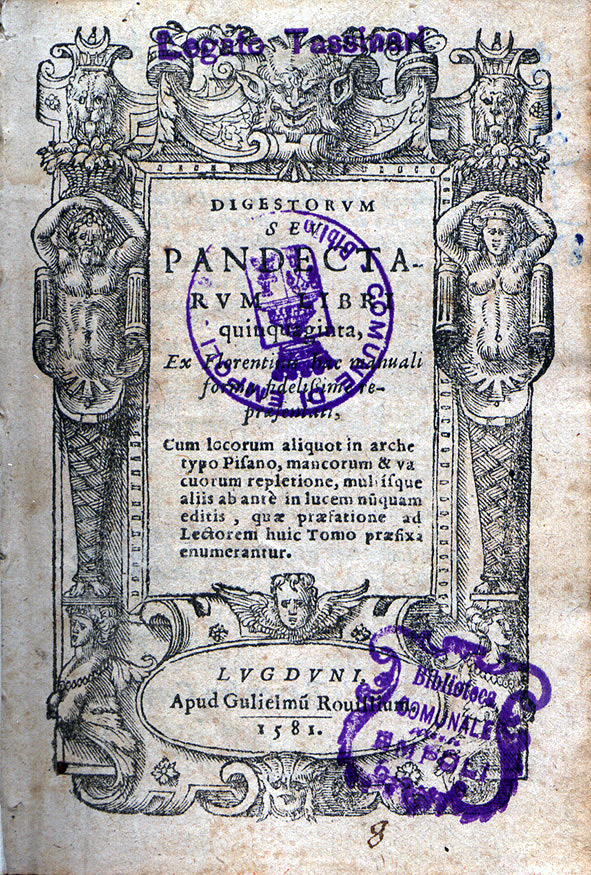
A 1581 reprint of the Digestorum from Justinian's Corpus Juris Civilis (527–534). The Corpus drew on the codices of Gregorius and Hermogenian, drafted and published under Diocletian's reign.

As with most emperors, much of Diocletian's daily routine rotated around legal affairs – responding to appeals and petitions, and delivering decisions on disputed matters. Rescripts, authoritative interpretations issued by the emperor in response to demands from disputants in both public and private cases, were a common duty of second- and third-century emperors. In the "nomadic" imperial courts of the later Empire, one can track the progress of the imperial retinue through the locations from whence particular rescripts were issued – the presence of the Emperor was what allowed the system to function. Whenever the imperial court would settle in one of the capitals, there was a glut in petitions, as in late 294 in Nicomedia, where Diocletian kept winter quarters.

Admittedly, Diocletian's praetorian prefects – Afranius Hannibalianus, Julius Asclepiodotus, and Aurelius Hermogenianus – aided in regulating the flow and presentation of such paperwork, but the deep legalism of Roman culture kept the workload heavy. Emperors in the forty years preceding Diocletian's reign had not managed these duties so effectively, and their output in attested rescripts is low. Diocletian, by contrast, was prodigious in his affairs: there are around 1,200 rescripts in his name still surviving, and these probably represent only a small portion of the total issue. The sharp increase in the number of edicts and rescripts produced under Diocletian's rule has been read as evidence of an ongoing effort to realign the whole Empire on terms dictated by the imperial center.

Under the governance of the jurists Gregorius, Aurelius Arcadius Charisius, and Hermogenianus, the imperial government began issuing official books of precedent, collecting and listing all the rescripts that had been issued since the reign of Hadrian (r. 117–138). The Codex Gregorianus includes rescripts up to 292, which the Codex Hermogenianus updated with a comprehensive collection of rescripts issued by Diocletian in 293 and 294. Although the very act of codification was a radical innovation, given the precedent-based design of the Roman legal system, the jurists were generally conservative, and constantly looked to past Roman practice and theory for guidance. They were probably given more free rein over their codes than the later compilers of the Codex Theodosianus (438) and Codex Justinianus (529) would have. Gregorius and Hermogenianus's codices lack the rigid structuring of later codes, and were not published in the name of the emperor, but in the names of their compilers. Their official character was clear in that both collections were acknowledged by courts as authoritative records of imperial legislation up to the date of their publication and regularly updated.

After Diocletian's reform of the provinces, governors were called iudex, or judge. The governor became responsible for his decisions first to his immediate superiors, as well as to the more distant office of the emperor. It was most likely at this time that judicial records became verbatim accounts of what was said in trial, making it easier to determine bias or improper conduct on the part of the governor. With these records and the Empire's universal right of appeal, Imperial authorities probably had a great deal of power to enforce behavior standards for their judges. In spite of Diocletian's attempts at reform, the provincial restructuring was far from clear, especially when citizens appealed the decisions of their governors. Proconsuls, for example, were often both judges of first instance and appeal, and the governors of some provinces took appellant cases from their neighbors. It soon became impossible to avoid taking some cases to the emperor for arbitration and judgment. Diocletian's reign marks the end of the classical period of Roman law. Where Diocletian's system of rescripts shows adherence to classical tradition, Constantine's law is full of Greek and eastern influences.

Partly in response to economic pressures and in order to protect the vital functions of the state, Diocletian restricted social and professional mobility. Peasants became tied to the land in a way that presaged later systems of land tenure and workers such as bakers, armorers, public entertainers and workers in the mint had their occupations made hereditary. Soldiers' children were also forcibly enrolled, something that followed spontaneous tendencies among the rank-and-file, but also expressed increasing difficulties in recruitment.

=== Military ===
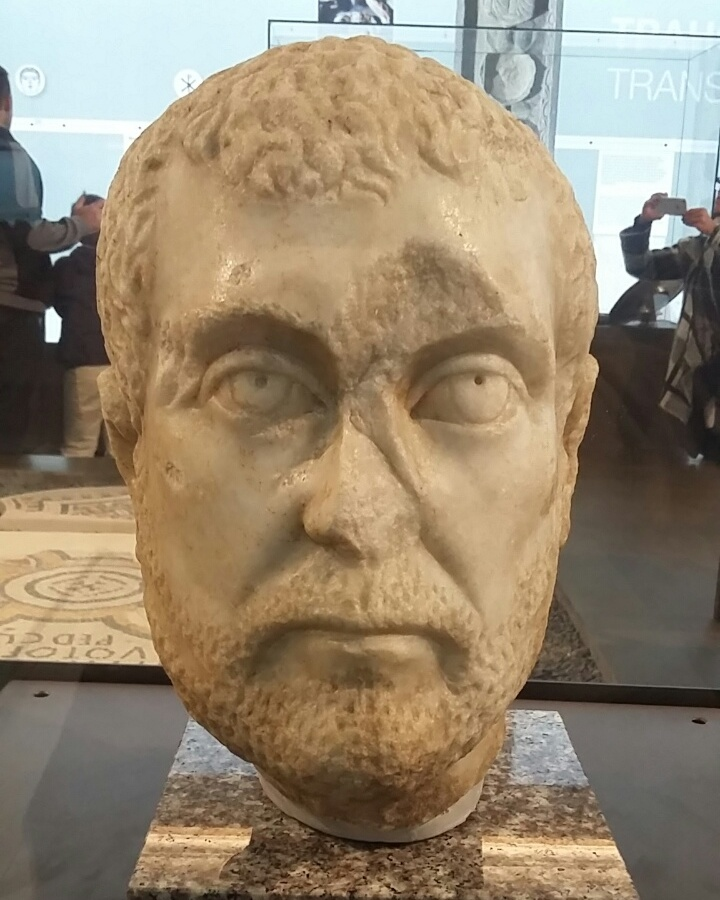
Bust labelled as Diocletian in the National Museum of Serbia.

It is archaeologically difficult to distinguish Diocletian's fortifications from those of his successors and predecessors. The Devil's Dykes, for example—the Danubian earthworks traditionally attributed to Diocletian—cannot even be securely dated to a particular century. The most that can be said about built structures under Diocletian's reign is that he rebuilt and strengthened forts at the Upper Rhine frontier (where he followed the works built under Probus along the Lake Constance-Basel and the Rhine–Iller–Danube line), on the Danube (where a new line of forts on the far side of the river, the Ripa Sarmatica, was added to older, rehabilitated fortresses), in Egypt and on the frontier with Persia. Beyond that, much discussion is speculative and reliant on the broad generalizations of written sources. Diocletian and the tetrarchs had no consistent plan for frontier advancement, and records of raids and forts built across the frontier are likely to indicate only temporary claims. The Strata Diocletiana, built after the Persian Wars, which ran from the Euphrates North of Palmyra and South towards northeast Arabia in the general vicinity of Bostra, is the classic Diocletianic frontier system, consisting of an outer road followed by tightly spaced forts – defensible hard-points manned by small garrisons – followed by further fortifications in the rear. In an attempt to resolve the difficulty and slowness of transmitting orders to the frontier, the new capitals of the tetrarchic era were all much closer to the empire's frontiers than Rome had been: Trier sat on the Moselle, a tributary of the Rhine, Sirmium and Serdica were close to the Danube, Thessaloniki was on the route leading eastward, and Nicomedia and Antioch were important points in dealings with Persia.

Lactantius criticized Diocletian for an excessive increase in troop sizes, declaring that "each of the four princes strove to maintain a much more considerable military force than any sole emperor had done in times past. There began to be fewer men who paid taxes than there were who received wages; so that the means of the husbandmen being exhausted by enormous impositions, the farms were abandoned, cultivated grounds became woodland, and universal dismay prevailed". The fifth-century pagan Zosimus, by contrast, praised Diocletian for keeping troops on the borders, rather than keeping them in the cities, as Constantine was held to have done. Both these views had some truth to them, despite the biases of their authors: Diocletian and the tetrarchs did greatly expand the army, and the growth was mostly in frontier regions, where the increased effectiveness of the new Diocletianic legions seem to have been mostly spread across a network of strongholds. Nevertheless, it is difficult to establish the precise details of these shifts given the weakness of the sources. The army expanded to about 580,000 men from a 285 strength of 390,000, of which 310,000 men were stationed in the East, most of whom manned the Persian frontier. The navy increased from approximately 45,000 to approximately 65,000 men. (Note: The 6th-century author John the Lydian provides extraordinarily precise troop numbers: 389,704 in the army and 45,562 in the navy. His precision has polarized modern historians. Some believe that Lydus found these figures in official documents and that they are therefore broadly accurate; others believe that he fabricated them.)

Diocletian's expansion of the army and civil service meant that the empire's tax burden grew. Since military upkeep took the largest portion of the imperial budget, any reforms here would be especially costly. The proportion of the adult male population, excluding slaves, serving in the army increased from roughly 1 in 25 to 1 in 15, an increase judged excessive by some modern commentators. Official troop allowances were kept to low levels, and the mass of troops often resorted to extortion or the taking of civilian jobs. Arrears became the norm for most troops. Many were even given payment in kind in place of their salaries. Were he unable to pay for his enlarged army, there would likely be civil conflict, potentially open revolt. Diocletian was led to devise a new system of taxation.

=== Economic ===
==== Taxation ====
In the early empire (30 BC – AD 235) the Roman government paid for what it needed in gold and silver. The coinage was stable. Requisition, forced purchase, was used to supply armies on the march. During the third-century crisis (235–285), the government resorted to requisition rather than payment in debased coinage, since it could never be sure of the value of money. Requisition was nothing more or less than seizure. Diocletian made requisition into tax. He introduced an extensive new tax system based on heads (capita) and land (iugera) – with one iugerum equal to approximately 0.65 acres – and tied to a new, regular census of the empire's population and wealth. Census officials traveled throughout the empire, assessed the value of labor and land for each landowner, and joined the landowners' totals together to make citywide totals of capita and iuga. The iugum was not a consistent measure of land, but varied according to the type of land and crop, and the amount of labor necessary for sustenance. The caput was not consistent either: women, for instance, were often valued at half a caput, and sometimes at other values. Cities provided animals, money, and manpower in proportion to its capita, and grain in proportion to its iuga. (Note: The army recruitment tax was called the praebitio tironum, and conscripted a part of each landowner's tenant farmers (coloni). When a capitulum extended across many farms, farmers provided the funds to compensate the neighbor who had supplied the recruit. Landowners of senatorial rank were able to commute the tax with a payment in gold (the aurum tironicum).)

Most taxes were due each year on 1 September, and levied from individual landowners by decuriones (decurions). These decurions, analogous to city councilors, were responsible for paying from their own pocket what they failed to collect. Diocletian's reforms also increased the number of financial officials in the provinces: more rationales and magistri privatae are attested under Diocletian's reign than before. These officials represented the interests of the fisc, which collected taxes in gold, and the Imperial properties. Fluctuations in the value of the currency made collection of taxes in kind the norm, although these could be converted into coin. Rates shifted to take inflation into account. In 296, Diocletian issued an edict reforming census procedures. This edict introduced a general five-year census for the whole empire, replacing prior censuses that had operated at different speeds throughout the empire. The new censuses would keep up with changes in the values of capita and iuga.

Italy, which had long been exempt from taxes, was included in the tax system from 290/291 as a diocesis. The city of Rome remained exempt; the "regions" (i.e., provinces) South of Rome (generally called "suburbicarian", as opposed to the Northern, "annonaria" region) seem to have been relatively less taxed, in what probably was a sop offered to the great senatorial families and their landed properties.

Diocletian's edicts emphasized the common liability of all taxpayers. Public records of all taxes were made public. The position of decurion, member of the city council, had been an honor sought by wealthy aristocrats and the middle classes who displayed their wealth by paying for city amenities and public works. Decurions were made liable for any shortfall in the amount of tax collected. Many tried to find ways to escape the obligation. By 300, civilians across the empire complained that there were more tax collectors than there were people to pay taxes.

==== Currency and inflation ====
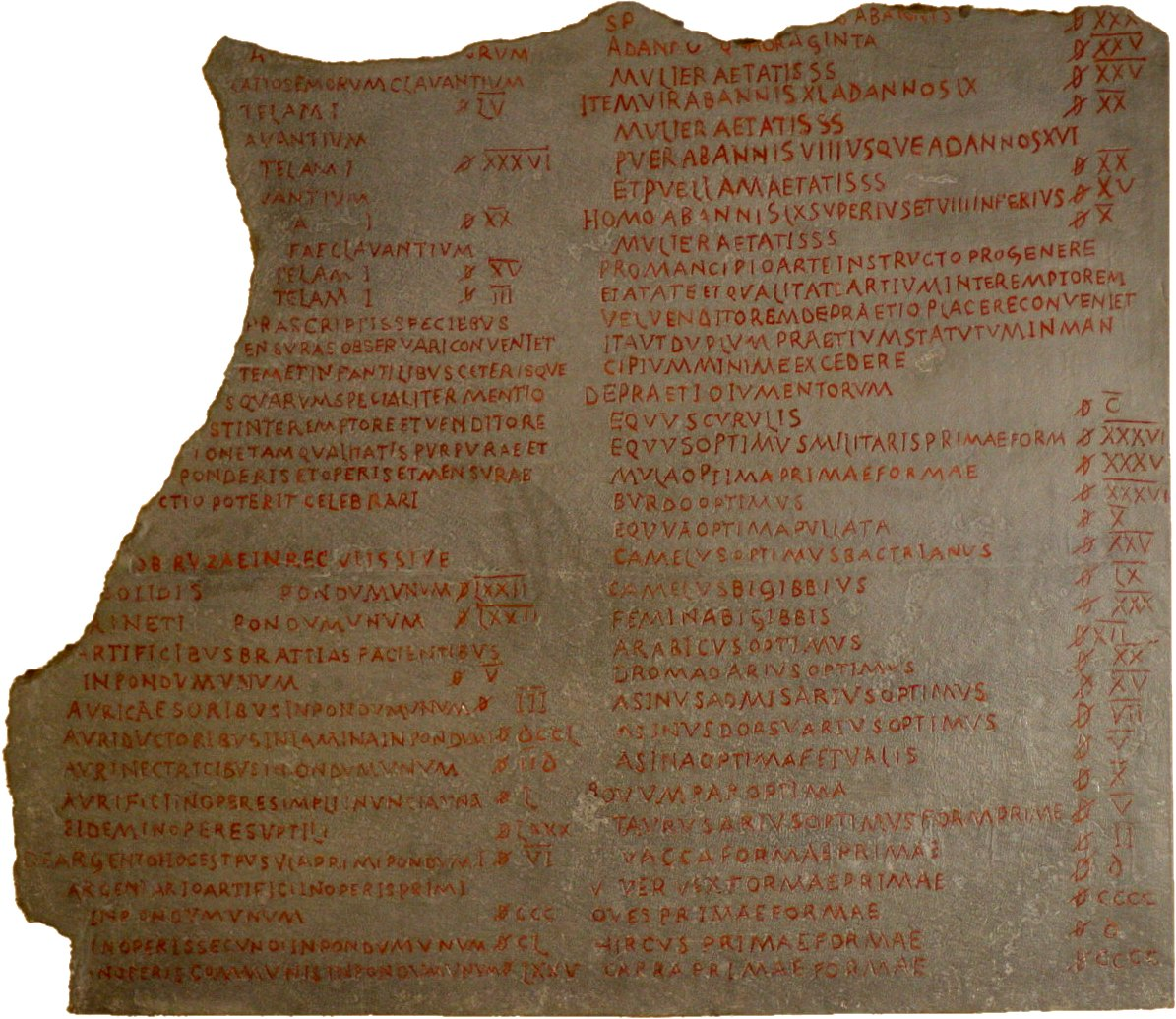
A fragment of the Edict on Maximum Prices (301), on display in Berlin.

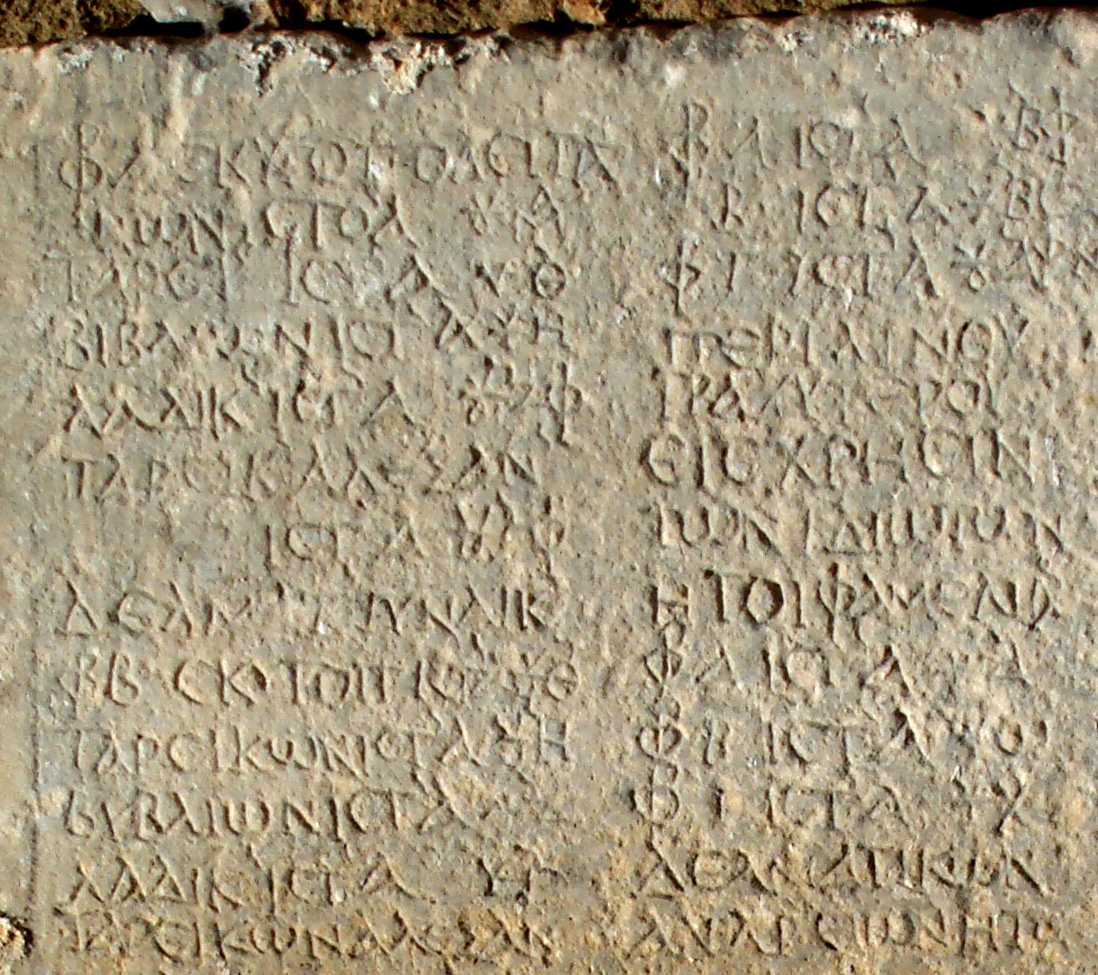
Part of the prices edict in Greek in its original area built into a medieval church, Geraki, Greece.

Aurelian's attempt to reform the currency had failed; the denarius was dead. Diocletian restored the three-metal coinage and issued better quality pieces. The new system consisted of five coins: the aureus/solidus, a gold coin weighing, like its predecessors, one-sixtieth of a pound; the argenteus, a coin weighing one ninety-sixth of a pound and containing ninety-five percent pure silver; the follis, sometimes referred to as the laureatus A, which is a copper coin with added silver struck at the rate of thirty-two to the pound; the radiatus, a small copper coin struck at the rate of 108 to the pound, with no added silver; and a coin known today as the laureatus B, a smaller copper coin struck at the rate of 192 to the pound. (Note: The denarius was dropped from the Imperial mints, but the values of new coins continued to be measured in reference to it.) Since the nominal values of these new issues were lower than their intrinsic worth as metals, the state was minting these coins at a loss. This practice could be sustained only by requisitioning precious metals from private citizens in exchange for state-minted coin (of a far lower value than the price of the precious metals requisitioned).

By 301, the system was in trouble, strained by a new bout of inflation. Diocletian, therefore, issued his Edict on Coinage, an act re-tariffing all debts so that the nummus, the most common coin in circulation, would be worth half as much. In the edict, preserved in an inscription from the city of Aphrodisias in Caria (near Geyre, Turkey), it was declared that all debts contracted before 1 September 301 must be repaid at the old standards, while all debts contracted after that date would be repaid at the new standards. It appears that the edict was made in an attempt to preserve the current price of gold and to keep the Empire's coinage on silver, Rome's traditional metal currency. This edict risked giving further momentum to inflationary trends, as had happened after Aurelian's currency reforms. The government's response was to issue a price freeze.

The Edict on Maximum Prices (Edictum De Pretiis Rerum Venalium) was issued two to three months after the coinage edict, somewhere between 20 November and 10 December 301. The best-preserved Latin inscription surviving from the Greek East, the edict survives in many versions, on materials as varied as wood, papyrus, and stone. In the edict, Diocletian declared that the current pricing crisis resulted from the unchecked greed of merchants, and had resulted in turmoil for the mass of common citizens. The language of the edict calls on the people's memory of their benevolent leaders, and exhorts them to enforce the provisions of the edict, thereby restoring perfection to the world. The edict goes on to list in detail over one thousand goods and accompanying retail prices not to be exceeded. Penalties are laid out for various pricing transgressions.

In the most basic terms, the edict was ignorant of the law of supply and demand: it ignored the fact that prices might vary from region to region according to product availability, and it ignored the impact of transportation costs in the retail price of goods. In the judgment of the historian David Potter, the edict was "an act of economic lunacy". The fact that the edict began with a long rhetorical preamble betrays at the same time a moralizing stance as well as a weak grasp of economics – perhaps simply the wishful thinking that criminalizing a practice was enough to stop it. There is no consensus about how effectively the edict was enforced.

Supposedly, inflation, speculation, and monetary instability continued, and a black market arose to trade in goods forced out of official markets. The edict's penalties were applied unevenly across the empire (some scholars believe they were applied only in Diocletian's domains), widely resisted, and eventually dropped, perhaps within a year of the edict's issue. Lactantius has written of the perverse accompaniments to the edict; of goods withdrawn from the market, of brawls over minute variations in price, of the deaths that came when its provisions were enforced. His account may be true, but it seems to modern historians exaggerated and hyperbolic, and the impact of the law is recorded in no other ancient source.

== Legacy ==
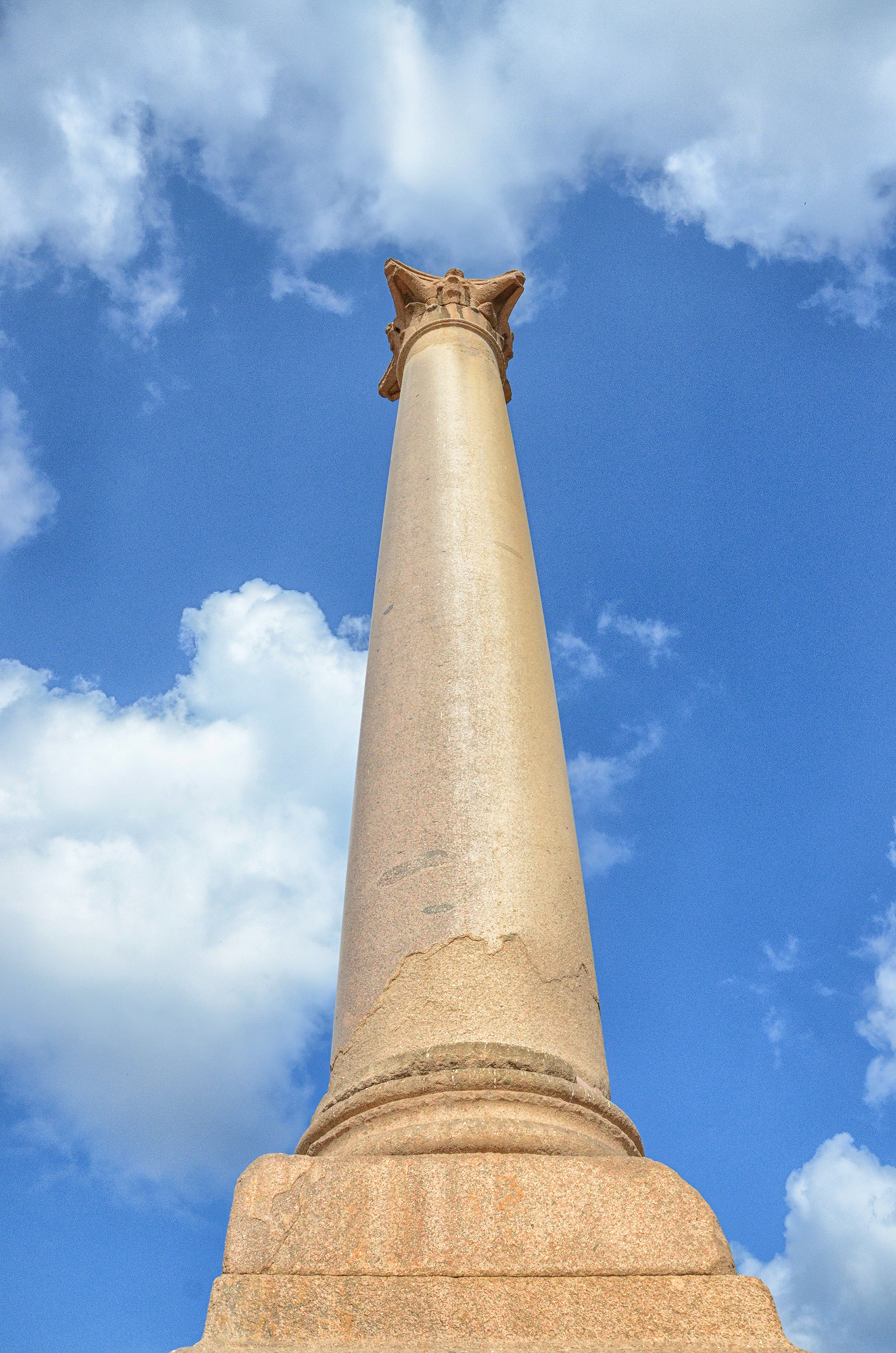
The monolithic granite column shaft of the Diocletianic honorific column in the Serapeum of Alexandria called "Pompey's Pillar" is 20.75 metres (68.1 ft) tall. Built 298–303.

The historian A.H.M. Jones observed that "It is perhaps Diocletian's greatest achievement that he reigned twenty-one years and then abdicated voluntarily, and spent the remaining years of his life in peaceful retirement." Diocletian was one of the few emperors of the third and fourth centuries to die naturally, and the first in the history of the empire to retire voluntarily. Once he retired, his tetrarchic system collapsed. Without the guiding hand of Diocletian, the empire fell into civil wars. Stability emerged after the defeat of Licinius by Constantine in 324. Under the Christian Constantine, Diocletian was maligned. Constantine's rule demonstrated the benefits of Diocletian's achievements and the autocratic principle he represented: the borders remained secure, in spite of Constantine's large expenditure of forces during his civil wars; the bureaucratic transformation of the Roman government was completed; and Constantine took Diocletian's court ceremonies and made them even more extravagant.

Constantine ignored those aspects of Diocletian's reign that did not suit him. Diocletian's policy of preserving a stable silver coinage was abandoned, and the gold solidus became the empire's primary currency instead. Diocletian's persecution of Christians was repudiated and changed to a policy of toleration and then favoritism. Christianity eventually became the official religion in 380. Most importantly, Diocletian's tax system and administrative reforms lasted, with some modifications, until the advent of the Muslims in the 630s. The combination of state autocracy and state religion was instilled in much of Europe, particularly in the lands which adopted Orthodox Christianity.

=== In Coptic church tradition ===
The Era of the Martyrs (Latin: anno martyrum or AM), also known as the Diocletian era (Latin: anno Diocletiani), is a method of numbering years used by the Church of Alexandria beginning in the 4th century anno Domini and by the Coptic Orthodox Church of Alexandria from the 5th century to the present. In this system of counting, the beginning of Diocletian's reign in 284 was used as the epoch, making Diocletian's first year in power into the Year 1 of that calendar. Western Christians were aware of this count but did not use it; Dionysius Exiguus replaced the anno Diocletiani era with his anno Domini era because he did not wish to continue the memory of a tyrant who persecuted Christians.

=== In Serbian mythology ===
Dukljan, a major villain in Serbian mythology who is presented as the adversary of God, is considered to be a mythological reflection of the historical Diocletian.

=== In Jewish tradition ===
The Talmud includes several semi-legendary accounts of Diocletian. One of them recounts that Diocletian was originally a swineherd, and that in this part of his life, he was teased and abused by young Jews. When he became the Emperor he called up the leaders of the Jews, who were fearful, saying "We have teased Diocletian the Swineherd but we respect Diocletian the Emperor" – to which Diocletian responded, "You must show respect even to the smallest and lowest of the Romans, because you can never know which one of us will rise to greatness."

== Bibliography ==
=== Ancient sources ===
- Lactantius (c. 316), De mortibus persecutorum,
- Eusebius (325), Church History Book 8.
- Eutropius (c. 370) Breviarium Book 9
- XII Panegyrici Latini (Twelve Latin Panegyrics) relevant panegyrics dated 289, 291, 297, 298, and 307.
- Aurelius Victor att. (5th century), Epitome de Caesaribus, translation (see also De Caesaribus)
- Historia Augusta (5th century), translation Archived 25 July 2021 at the Wayback Machine
- Justinian I (534), Codex Justinianus, translation
- Joannes Zonaras (c. 1140) Epitome of History (Επιτομή Ιστορίων). Compendium extract: Diocletian to the Death of Galerius: 284–311

=== Modern sources ===
- Banchich, Thomas M. (1997). "Iulianus (ca. 286–293 A.D.)". De Imperatoribus Romanis. Archived from the original on 26 March 2022.
- Barnes, Timothy D. (1975). "Two Senators under Constantine". The Journal of Roman Studies. 65: 40–49. doi:10.2307/370062. JSTOR 370062. S2CID 163755638.
- Weitzmann, Kurt (1979). Age of Spirituality: Late Antique and Early Christian Art, Third to Seventh Century : Catalogue of the Exhibition at the Metropolitan Museum of Art, November 19, 1977, Through February 12, 1978. edited by Kurt Weitzmann. Metropolitan Museum of Art. pp. 10–11. ISBN 978-0-87099-179-0.
- Barnes, Timothy D. (1981). Constantine and Eusebius. Cambridge, MA: Harvard University Press. ISBN 978-0-674-16531-1.
- Barnes, Timothy D. (1982). The New Empire of Diocletian and Constantine. Cambridge, MA: Harvard University Press. doi:10.4159/harvard.9780674280670. ISBN 0-674-28066-0. Archived from the original on 19 March 2023.
- Bleckmann, Bruno (2006). "Diocletianus". Brill's New Pauly: Encyclopedia of the Ancient World. Brill. ISBN 90-04-12259-1. Archived from the original on 20 December 2022.
- Bowman, Alan (2005). "Diocletian and the first tetrarchy, A.D. 284–305". In Bowman, Alan; Garnsey, Peter; Cameron, Averil (eds.). The Cambridge Ancient History XII: The Crisis of the Empire, A.D. 193–337. The Cambridge Ancient History, second series (2nd ed.). Cambridge: Cambridge University Press. ISBN 978-0-521-30199-2. Archived from the original on 19 March 2023.
- Brown, Peter (1989). The World of Late Antiquity: AD 150–750. New York and London: W.W. Norton and Co. ISBN 978-0-39395-803-4.
- Bruce, Lorne D. "A Note on Christian Libraries during the ‘Great Persecution,’ 303–305 A.D." The Journal of Library History. 15, no. 2 (1980): 127–137.
- Burgess, Richard W. (2023). "Cutting the ‹Herculian› Knot: When Did Maximian Become Caesar and Augustus?". In Schuler; Haensch; Killen (eds.). Chiron 53: Mitteilungen der Kommission für Alte Geschichte und Epigraphik des Deutschen Archäologischen Instituts. Walter de Gruyter GmbH & Co KG. pp. 1–39. doi:10.34780/74h5-hc1b. ISBN 978-3-11-125249-0.
- Burgess, R.W. (1996). "The Date of the Persecution of Christians in the Army". Journal of Theological Studies. 47 (1): 157–158. doi:10.1093/jts/47.1.157. Archived from the original on 19 March 2023.
- Carrié, Jean-Michel; Rousselle, Aline (1999). L'Empire Romain en mutation: des Sévères à Constantin, 192–337. Paris: Éditions du Seuil. p. 228. ISBN 2-02-025819-6.
- Christol, Michel; Nony, D. (2003). Rome et son Empire. Paris: Hachette. ISBN 2-02-025819-6.
- Corcoran, Simon (2006). "Before Constantine". In Lenski, Noel Emmanuel (ed.). The Cambridge Companion to the Age of Constantine. Cambridge: Cambridge University Press. pp. 35–58. ISBN 0-521-52157-2. Archived from the original on 19 March 2023.
- Delbrück, Richard (2007) [1932]. Antike Porphyrwerke [Ancient Porphyry Works] (in German). Berlin [reprinted: Rome]: De Gruyter [reprinted L'Erma di Bretschneider]. ISBN 978-88-8265-454-2. OCLC 191032377.
- Digeser, Elizabeth DePalma (2000). The Making of A Christian Empire: Lactantius and Rome. London: Cornell University Press. ISBN 0-8014-3594-3.
- DiMaio, Michael (1997). "L. Domitius Domitianus and Aurelius Achilleus (ca. 296/297–ca. 297/298)". De Imperatoribus Romanis. Archived from the original on 26 March 2022.
- Elsner, Jaś (1998). Imperial Rome and Christian Triumph. Oxford: Oxford University Press. ISBN 0-19-284201-3.
- Gibbon, Edward (1952) [1789]. Decline and Fall of the Roman Empire. Chicago: Encyclopædia Britannica, Inc. 2 volumes.
- Harries, Jill (1999). Law and Empire in Late Antiquity. Cambridge: Cambridge University Press. ISBN 0-521-41087-8. Archived from the original on 19 March 2023.
- Helgeland, John (1974). "Christians and the Roman Army A.D. 173–337". Church History. 43 (2): 149–163. doi:10.2307/3163949. JSTOR 3163949. S2CID 162376477.
- Jones, A.H.M. (1964). The Later Roman Empire 284–602. Oxford: Blackwell. OCLC 792013.
- Jones, A.H.M.; J.R. Martindale & J. Morris (1971). "C. Aur. Val. Diocletianus 2". The Prosopography of the Later Roman Empire. Vol. 1. Cambridge: Cambridge University Press. pp. 253–254. ISBN 0-521-07233-6.
- Kuhoff, Wolfgang (2001). Diokletian und die Epoche der Tetrarchie. Das römische Reich zwischen Krisenbewältigung und Neuaufbau (284–313 n. Chr.). Frankfurt am Main: Peter Lang. ISBN 3-631-36792-9.
- Lenski, Noel Emmanuel (2006). "Reign of Constantine". The Cambridge Companion to the Age of Constantine. Cambridge: Cambridge University Press. pp. 59–61. ISBN 0-521-52157-2. Archived from the original on 19 March 2023.
- Leadbetter, William (2001a). "Numerianus (283–284 A.D.)". De Imperatoribus Romanis. Archived from the original on 26 March 2022.
- Leadbetter, William (2001b). "Carinus (283–285 A.D.)". De Imperatoribus Romanis. Archived from the original on 26 March 2022.
- Liebeschuetz, J. H. W. G. (1979). Continuity and Change in Roman Religion. Oxford: Oxford University Press. p. 247. ISBN 0-19-814822-4.
- Mathisen, Ralph W. (1997). "Diocletian (284–305 A.D.)". De Imperatoribus Romanis. Archived from the original on 26 March 2022.
- Millar, Fergus (1993). The Roman Near East, 31 B.C.–A.D. 337. Cambridge, MA: Harvard University Press. ISBN 978-0-674-77886-3. Archived from the original on 19 March 2023.
- Nixon, C. E. V.; Rodgers, Barbara Saylor (2023). In Praise of Later Roman Emperors: The Panegyrici Latini. Univ of California Press. ISBN 978-0-520-34282-8.
- Odahl, Charles Matson (2004). Constantine and the Christian Empire. New York: Routledge. ISBN 978-1-134-68631-5. Archived from the original on 20 December 2022.
- Potter, David S. (2005). The Roman Empire at Bay: AD 180–395. New York: Routledge. ISBN 0-415-10057-7. Archived from the original on 19 March 2023.
- Rees, Roger (2004). Diocletian and the Tetrarchy. Edinburgh: Edinburgh University Press. ISBN 0-7486-1661-6. JSTOR 10.3366/j.ctvxcrmzd. Archived from the original on 20 December 2022.
- Southern, Patricia (2001). The Roman Empire from Severus to Constantine. New York: Routledge. ISBN 0-415-23944-3.
- Southern, Patricia (2015). The Roman Empire from Severus to Constantine (2nd ed.). Routledge. ISBN 978-1-317-49694-6.
- Tilley, Maureen A, ed. (1996). Donatist Martyr Stories: The Church in Conflict in Roman North Africa. Liverpool: Liverpool University Press. ISBN 0-85323-931-2..
- Treadgold, Warren (1997). A History of the Byzantine State and Society. Stanford: Stanford University Press. ISBN 978-0-8047-2630-6. Archived from the original on 22 January 2023.
- Wilkes, J. J. (1993). Diocletian's Palace, Split: Residence of a Retired Roman Emperor. Oxford: Ian Sanders Memorial Committee. ISBN 978-0-9521073-0-9.
- Williams, Stephen (1985). Diocletian and the Roman Recovery. London: B.T. Batsford. doi:10.4324/9780203461037. ISBN 0-7134-4605-6. Archived from the original on 19 March 2023.
- Williams, Stephen (1997). Diocletian and the Roman Recovery. Psychology Press. ISBN 978-0-415-91827-5.
- "Palace of Diocletian | building, Split, Croatia". Encyclopædia Britannica. Chicago: Encyclopædia Britannica, Inc. 20 August 2015. Archived from the original on 13 March 2023.

Regnal titles
Preceded by Numerian and Carinus	Roman emperor 284–305; Served alongside: Maximian	Succeeded by Constantius I and Galerius
Political offices
Preceded by Carinus, Numerian	Roman consul 284–285 with Lucius Caesonius Bassus & Titus Claudius Aurelius Aristobulus	Succeeded by Marcus Junius Maximus, Vettius Aquilinus
Preceded by Marcus Junius Maximus, Vettius Aquilinus	Roman consul 287 with Maximian	Succeeded by Maximian, Pomponius Ianuarianus
Preceded by Marcus Magrius Bassus, Lucius Ragonius Quintianus	Roman consul 290 with Maximian	Succeeded by Gaius Junius Tiberianus, Cassius Dio
Preceded by Afranius Hannibalianus, Julius Asclepiodotus	Roman consul 293 with Maximian	Succeeded by Constantius I, Galerius
Preceded by Nummius Tuscus, Gaius Annius Anullinus	Roman consul 296 with Constantius I	Succeeded by Maximian, Galerius
Preceded by Anicius Faustus, Virius Gallus	Roman consul 299 with Maximian	Succeeded by Constantius I, Galerius
Preceded by Constantius I, Galerius	Roman consul 303–304 with Maximian	Succeeded by Constantius I, Galerius
Preceded by Maximian, Constantine I, Severus II, Maximinus II, Galerius	Roman consul 308 with Galerius, Maxentius, Valerius Romulus	Succeeded by Licinius I, Constantine I, Maxentius, Valerius Romulus
