= Anicius Faustus =

3rd-century Roman statesman and official

Anicius Faustus (c. 240 – after 300) was a Roman senator who was appointed consul in AD 298.

== Biography ==
A member of the gens Anicia, Paulinus was possibly the son of Sextus Cocceius Anicius Faustus Paulinus, the Proconsular governor of Africa during the 260s, and grandson of Quintus Anicius Faustus Paulinus. He was the patron of the town of Uzappa.

If he is identified as the Faustus mentioned on the Great Altar of Hercules in Rome, he served as Praetor urbanus early in his career. He was subsequently appointed suffect consul probably sometime during the 270s. He was then made consul posterior alongside Virius Gallus in 298. After serving as consul, he was appointed Praefectus Urbi of Rome, serving from 299 until 1 March 300.

It is postulated that Faustus married the noblewoman Amnia Demetrias, daughter of Titus Flavius Stasicles Metrophanes (fl. 190-199 AD) and Claudia Capitolina according to Christian Settipani; with whom he probably had at least two sons: Amnius Anicius Julianus, Consul in 322, and Sextus Anicius Paulinus, the consul of 325.

== Sources ==
- Chastagnol, André, Les Fastes de la Prefecture de Rome au Bas-Empire (1962)
- Martindale, John R.; Jones, A. H. M.; Morris, John, eds. (1971). The Prosopography of the Later Roman Empire: Volume I, AD 260–395. Cambridge: Cambridge University Press. ISBN 0-521-07233-6.

Oxyrhynchus Papyrus P.Mich 9 547, a receipt for hire of a whipbearer. It names Anicius Faustus (and Virius Gallus) as current Consuls, and is dated to the day, September 6, 298 (15th and 14th and 7th year of our lords Diocletian and Maximian, Augusti, and Constantius and Maximian, distinguished Caesars, in the consulship of Anicius Faustus and Virius Gallus, Thoth 9)

Political offices
Preceded by Maximian V Galerius II	Roman consul 298 with Virius Gallus	Succeeded by Diocletian VII; Maximian VI
