= Carus' Sasanian campaign =

283 Roman campaign in Mesopotamia

Carus' invasion of the Sasanian Empire
- Part of the Roman–Sasanian wars
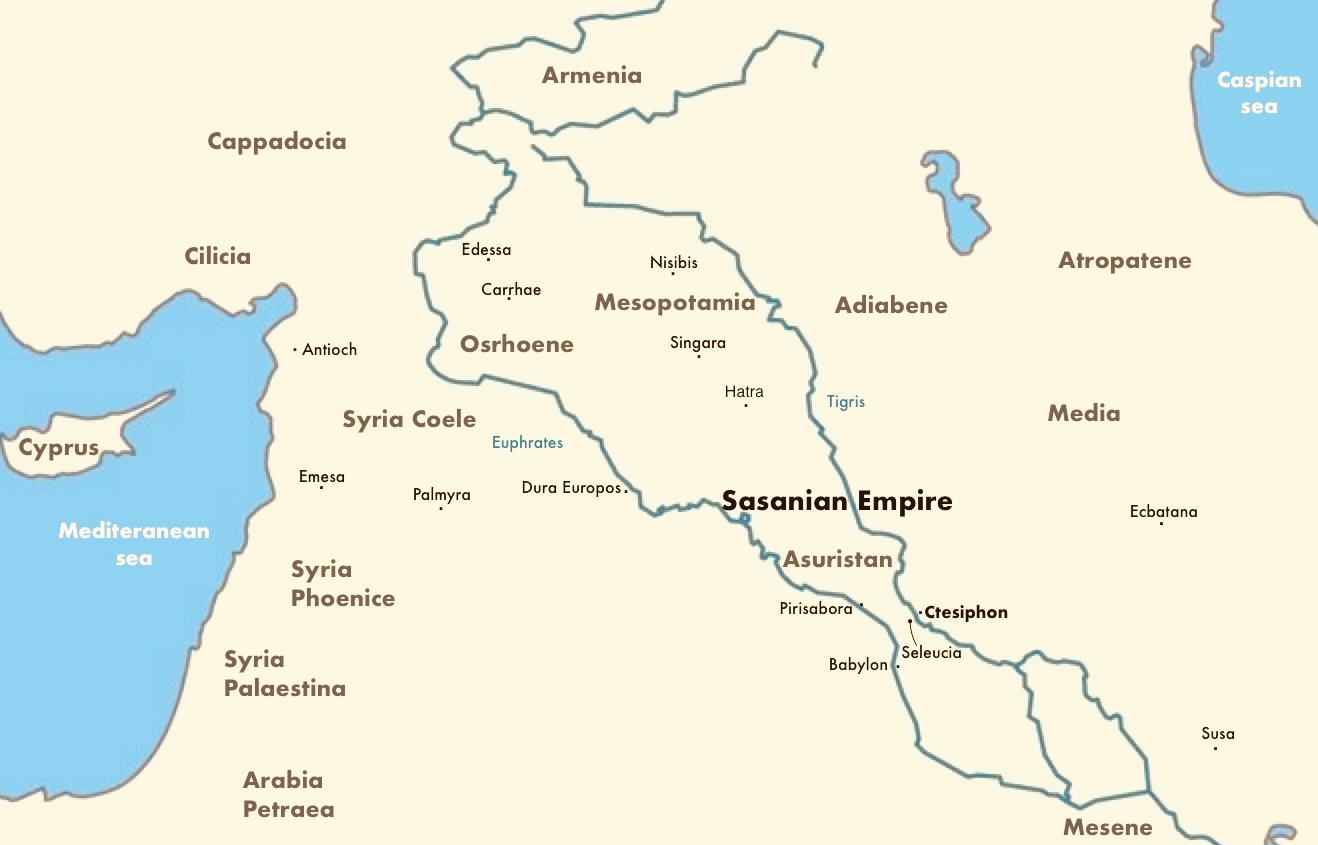
- Rome's third-century frontiers with Persia.
Date	283 AD
Location	Mesopotamia
Result	Inconclusive
Territorial changes	Status quo ante bellum

Belligerents
Roman Empire	Sasanian Empire

Commanders and leaders
Carus †; Numerian †	Bahram II

Casualties and losses
Unknown	Unknown

The Sasanian campaign of Carus was a military campaign conducted by the Roman Emperor Carus against the Sasanian Empire in 283. Following Carus' accession in 282, he made his eldest son Carinus co-emperor. Leaving Carinus in charge of the western part of the empire, Carus and his younger son Numerian brought an army east into Mesopotamia, quickly advancing on Seleucia and the Sasanian capital, Ctesiphon. Sasanian internal difficulties weakened their resistance to the assault, and both cities were captured by the Romans.

Carus died suddenly in the summer of 283 near Ctesiphon, leaving Numerian in command of the army; following this, the Romans withdrew from Mesopotamia, in unclear circumstances. Late in 284, returning from the east, Numerian also died. His withdrawal did not entail negotiations with the Sasanians, leaving relations between the empires unclear. After Numerian's death, Diocletian was acclaimed emperor by the eastern army; he prevailed over Carinus the following year and in 287 made peace with Persia.

== Sources ==
The study of third-century Roman history is significantly hindered by the paucity of written sources. No contemporary narrative historical text on Roman history from the third or first half of the fourth century survives, and the extant texts of the period belong to a range of genres. The immediate years after Aurelian's death in 275 are especially lacking in contemporary sources. The literary sources for the reign of Carus and his sons provide only a general framework for the events of the period; a significant number of them likely reflect the official narrative of the Diocletianic period, particularly in their accounts of the deaths of Carus and Numerian, and they provide limited details regarding the course of Carus' Persian war.

Only one fragment of a contemporary literary source is extant in the form of Nemesianus' Cynegetica, where the poet glorifies the military successes of Carus' sons. More substantial literary sources exist from the second half of the fourth century, including the epitomes of Aurelius Victor, Festus, Eutropius, and the Epitome de Caesaribus. The Historia Augusta provides an unreliable but detailed account of the reign of Carus and his sons, but only brief accounts for Carus' Persian war. Literary sources of the sixth century include the Historia Nova of Zosimus, but surviving details for the reign of Carus are limited, and the chronicler Malalas is unreliable. Later Byzantine authors, including twelfth-century Zonaras, also have significance, particularly due to the limited state of source transmission. Many of the literary sources draw upon a hypothesised lost fourth-century work of imperial history known as the Kaisergeschichte. Further sources of transmission likely include the lost work of Nicomachus Flavianus, possibly dating to the end of the fourth century, and the work of pagan historian Eunapius of Sardis, which has only survived in fragments.

Outside of narrative history, significant references to the period are present in rhetoric and legal literature in the form of the Panegyrici Latini and Codex Justinianus, in addition to the poetry of Nemesianus. The Codex Justinianus includes 28 rescripts for the reigns of Carus and his sons. Inscriptions, papyri, and coinage also inform the reconstruction of their reigns.

== Background ==
=== Political and military context ===
The death of Severus Alexander in AD 235 was followed by a half-century of major disruption to the Roman empire. Civil and foreign wars were its primary feature, with over fifty individuals claiming the title of emperor while the frontiers were commonly subject to invasion. Half way into the century, Rome's challenges developed into a period of political, economic, and military crisis. On the frontiers, it was denoted by persistent incursions and assaults, and the empire experienced raids that reached its interior. The invasions of Shapur I were among the most significant of the challenges Rome was faced with during the period. Over the 250s, the Romans contended with direct threats to the Italian peninsula on their northern frontiers, while Shapur launched damaging campaigns across the eastern provinces, culminating in the capture of emperor Valerian. The years that followed saw the empire itself fragmented into three.

Roman, Gallic, and Palmyrene territory in the early 270s.

Under the reigns of Gallienus' successors, a period of military recovery began for the Romans that eventually restored the empire. Aurelian successfully repelled invading Vandals, Alemanni and Juthungi, and between 272 and 274, he reintegrated the secessionist Gallic and Palmyrene empires. Probus had a similarly active reign fighting foreign enemies, as Rome's inability to control its frontiers ensured he had to. The underlying weaknesses of the Roman state persisted under both emperors, and the erosion of confidence in the military precipitated further challenges on the frontiers.

Despite the unrest in the east caused by Palmyra, relations between Rome and the Sasanians since Shapur's final campaign had been uneventful. Following the capture of Valerian in 260, Shapur did not repeat any comparative success over the remaining years of his reign. Odaenathus' reconquests in Mesopotamia and advances into Persia preceded the king's own death in 270; thereafter, his empire entered a period of instability, leaving the Sasanians unable to pursue conflict with their western neighbour.

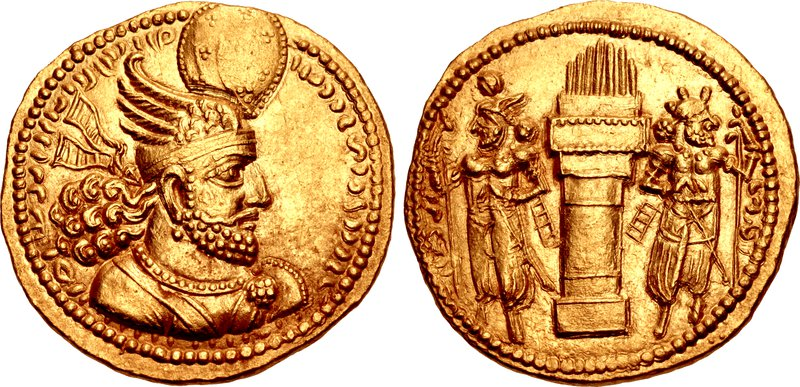
Dinar of Bahram II, possible Herat mint.

Shapur was succeeded by the brief reign of his son, Hormizd I, who was soon succeeded by another son, Bahram I. The latter's accession may have been partly facilitated by the Zoroastrian priest Kerdir, whose position within Sasanian politics had grown significantly following Shapur's death. His elevation and prominence may have contributed to their internal difficulties and in 276, when Sasanian interests had likely already been compelled away from the west, Bahram II succeeded his father. His succession may have created further friction with Narseh, who had designs on becoming king himself, and he also had to contend with the revolt of Hormizd later in his reign.

=== Carus' accession ===
Foreign invasions and internal challenges to power persisted throughout the reigns of Carus' immediate predecessors but they had frequent success in defending against them. Probus and his subordinates fought an array of foreign enemies and brigands across the empire, and suppressed several usurpers. His first few years as emperor were devoted to securing Gaul and the Rhine frontier, before turning to the Danube in 278 once the Franks and Alemanni had been defeated. He followed his successes in Raetia against Burgundians and Vandals with further victories in the balkans; in the east, frontier incursions into Egypt were repelled, and large-scale banditry in Cremna suppressed. Papyri dated to autumn 279 attests to his adoption of the title Persicus Maximus, though it may have related to eastern border security and not larger conflict with the Sasanians.

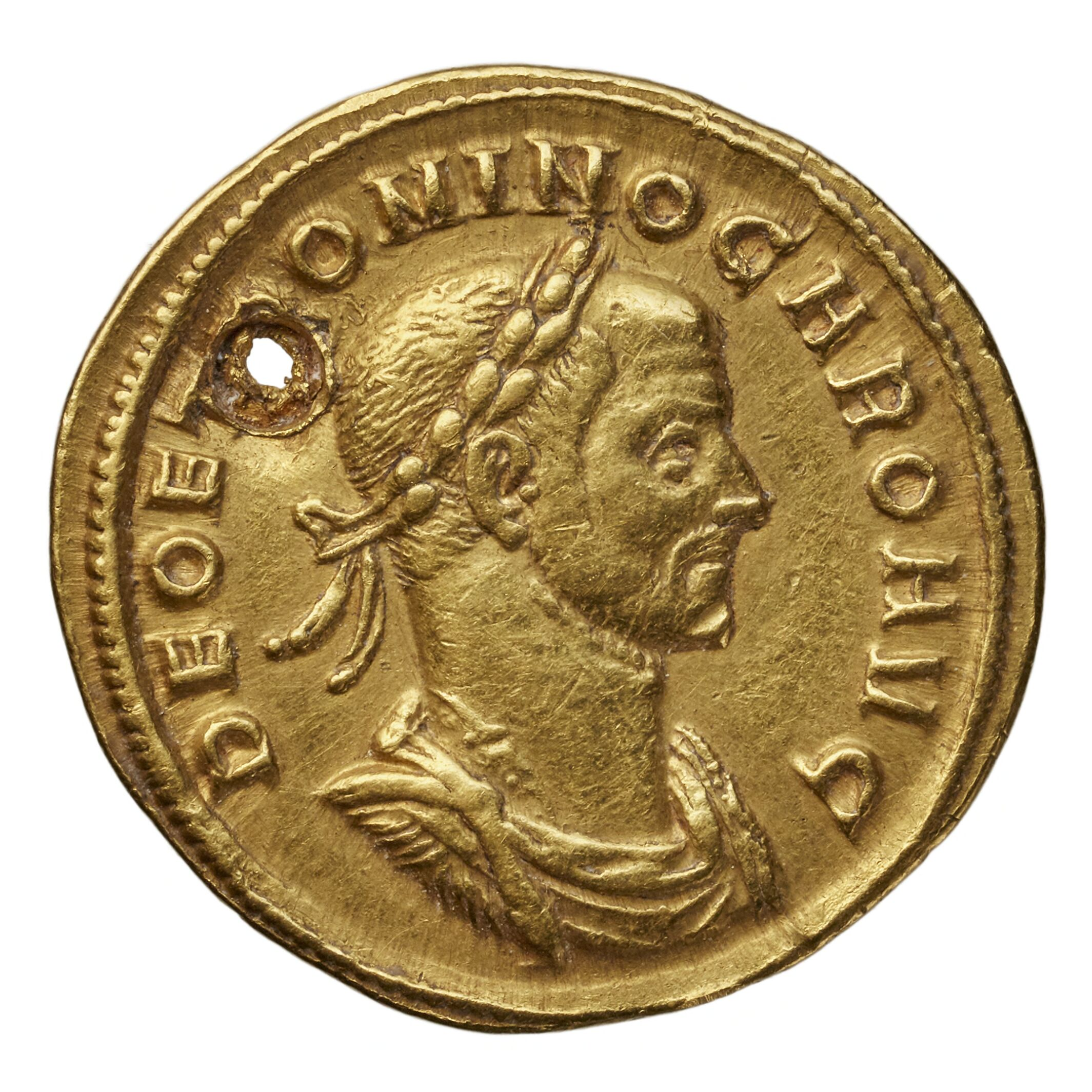
Aureus of Carus c. November 282, Siscia mint.

Over 280 and the following year, usurpations were attempted in Britain, Gaul, and Syria, but were successfully quelled. By autumn 281, Probus had returned to Rome where he celebrated a triumph before moving east to Panonnia. With his forces assembled near the Danube frontier, he employed his soldiers in agricultural and engineering projects which may have contributed to their growing discontentment. Increasing dissatisfaction within the Roman army culminated in Probus' praetorian prefect Carus rebelling against him. Probus' attempt to counter him failed, as the troops he sent against him defected to Carus' side. Between September and December 282, Probus was killed by his own soldiers in Sirmium, and Carus was declared emperor by the end of the year. While he did not go to Rome for senatorial ratification, his son, Carinus, went in his stead. From the accession of Carus onwards, the senate's role in imperial succession was permanently diminished.

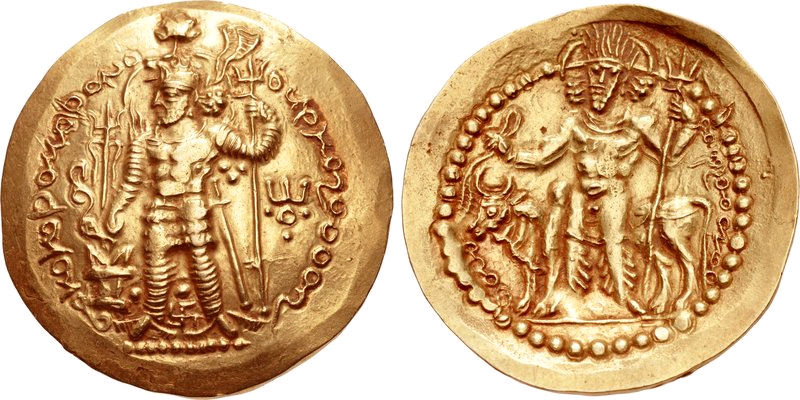
Dinar of Hormizd (Hormizd I Kushanshah), c. AD 285-300.

War with the Sasanians had become a Roman imperial priority during the latter part of Aurelian's reign, but his assassination in 275 ensured the campaign never came to fruition; plans from his immediate successors were similarly cut short. Probus was likely preparing to invade in 282 when he too fell victim to mutiny. The following year, with Carus leading the army assembled by his predecessor, this long-awaited invasion was set in motion. Although exact motivations for the war remain uncertain, it was primarily in response to the defeats inflicted by Shapur I in previous decades, providing legitimacy for the emperor while restoring Rome's reputation and standing in the east. Securing Roman territory in the east was also a possible motivator. Although the Sasanians had likely been absent from the province of Mesopotamia following Odaenathus' offensives, Persian incursions may have occurred prior to Carus' invasion. Restoring Roman influence in the kingdom of Armenia, which had been under Persian suzerainty for decades, may also have been a secondary aim of the campaign. A likely contributing factor in Carus' decision to invade in 283 was the Sasanian empire's internal instability: Hormizd, brother of Persian king Bahram II, had led an insurrection in the eastern half of Persia, rendering the empire vulnerable in the west.

== War ==
Seleucia, Ctesiphon, and surrounding urban settlements.

In early 283, Carus and Numerian moved east towards Persia, leaving Carinus to take charge of the western provinces. On their way east, Carus led a brief and successful campaign against the Sarmatians along the Danube. They then proceeded to Antioch in spring of 283, a frequent base of operations for previous campaigns against the Parthians and Sasanians. At this juncture, Carinus was likely elevated to the rank of Augusti, possibly in connection to his victory on the Rhine against the Germans, for which both Carinus and Carus were awarded the title Germanicus Maximus. In late spring, with preparations for the invasion complete, Carus led the Roman forces from Antioch and thence across the Persian frontiers.

The surviving sources for the campaign furnish few details regarding its trajectory and course. While the exact route taken by Carus is uncertain, he likely led his forces across the Euphrates, before following the river downstream and continuing along the Royal Canal to the Tigris, similar to successive and preceding Roman invasions. His army's composition is unknown but it may have been similar to the forces led east by Aurelian in 272, and it may have been accompanied by a supply fleet on the Euphrates Of the literary sources, the Historia Augusta describes it as a vast invading force consisting of the multitude of troops assembled by Probus.

The army's southeasterly march towards Ctesiphon was swift, and they encountered minimal resistance as they passed through southern Mesopotamia. The Romans faced more significant resistance along the Royal Canal, shortly before they reached Seleucia, during the siege and capture of the city of Meinas Sabatha. Meinas Sabatha is likely identifiable with the ruined settlement later referenced by Ammianus Marcellinus: "a deserted city destroyed in former days by the emperor Carus". It was midsummer when Carus, leading the Roman forces, reached Seleucia and the Sasanian capital, Ctesiphon, which lay directly across the Tigris. Both cities were quickly captured.

In a report unique to Zonaras, the Persians attempted to repel the Romans by diverting a river into their encampment: "But the army of the Romans had a close brush with danger. For they were encamped in a gully, and the Persians, when they observed this, by means of a trench diverted toward the gully the river flowing nearby. But Carus charged the Persians, met with success, and routed them." The diversion of rivers was an established defense measure employed in Mesopotamia, and Zonaras' report may have related to conflict in connection to the sieges of Ctesiphon and Coche. While Carus captured Ctesiphon, Bahram II was likely engaged in suppressing a revolt and was unable to mount an effective defense of his capital. In the Sasanian east, the rebellion of Bahram's brother, Hormizd, continued with the aid of the Saka and the Kushan.

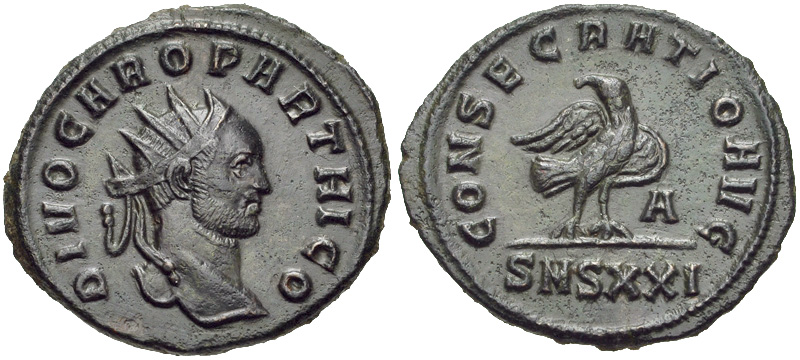
Antoninianus of Carus c. 284, bearing on its obverse the legend DIVO CARO PARTHICO; consecration issue minted at Siscia.

The invasion marked the first successful Roman campaign into southern Mesopotamia by a reigning emperor since Septimius Severus' Parthian war in 197/198. Carus assumed the titles Parthicus, Persicus, and Persicus Maximus following the capture of Ctesiphon. In Nemesianus' Cynegetica, the Carthaginian poet notes the capture of "the time-honoured citadels of Babylon", indicating that news of Carus' conquest of the Sasanian capital was widely disseminated throughout the empire in the months that followed.

== Withdrawal ==
=== Carus' death ===
In July, while encamped beyond the Tigris near Ctesiphon, Carus died. Most ancient sources report that he was struck by lightning. The authors of the Latin epitomes of the fourth century all report this cause of death, likely drawing from the hypothetical Kaisergeschichte. Some of these accounts, written in the aftermath of Julian's campaign in 363, accused Carus of immodesty and defiance of the gods, culminating in his death by lightning; Julian was similarly criticised for ignoring prophetic advice and omens. Various Christian and later Byzantine authors report the same cause of death, including Jerome, Orosius, and Zonaras. Over subsequent centuries, his unique manner of death continued to fascinate the Romans, entering into the poetry of Claudian and Sidonius Apollinaris. In addition to a lightning strike, some sources report a death by illness. In another Byzantine variant, Carus is said to have died campaigning against the Huns following his campaign against Persia. In the chronicle of Malalas, the Sarmatians are erroneously identified as the Huns in an anachronistic conflation echoed by later Byzantine writers.

Despite the prevalence of the account within the sources, a lightning strike in southern Mesopotamia in the summer is virtually impossible. Carus was in his sixties when he died and most scholarly hypotheses for his death involve assassination by a cabal of senior officers, wounds, or natural causes, with no consensus. While some ancient sources report that Carus had resolved to advance further into Persia, his immediate objectives after the capture of the Sasanian capital are unclear. Upon the death of his father, Numerian was declared Augustus and the Romans started to withdraw. Their return journey likely saw them march back along the Royal Canal before following the Euphrates upstream to Roman territory, where their pace could increase. An imperial rescript dated to either 8 September or December attests to Numerian's later presence back in Syria in the city of Emesa.

=== Numerian's death ===
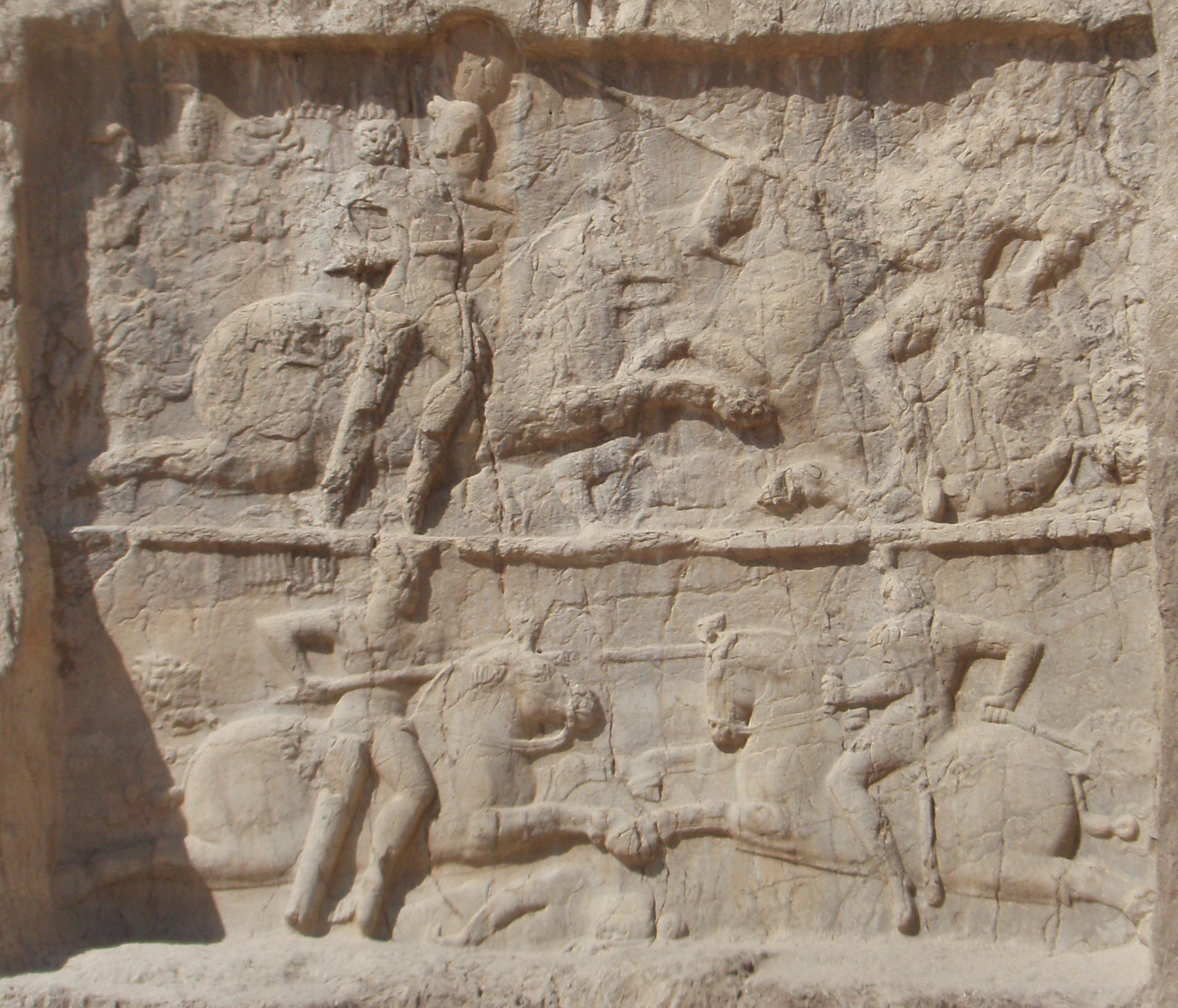
Sasanian relief at Naqsh-e Rostam.

After Carus' death, Numerian's activity as co-emperor in the east is unclear; of the sources, a majority only report of his return in a litter through Asia Minor. However, another imperial rescript dated March 18 supports his continued presence in Emesa into the following year. Like his father, he assumed the title Persicus Maximus, with its earliest attestation being from 284. By the summer, Numerian had returned to Antioch, where aurei and antoniniani were struck to compensate the soldiers. Consecration issues for Carus and coins denoting victory were minted in large quantities at Tripolis and Antioch.

The Latin sources indicate that no further hostilities occurred between Rome and the Sasanians under Numerian, though some later Byzantine texts claim a resumption of conflict took place following the death of Carus. Some of the accounts claim that Numerian suffered a defeat, while epigraphic and numismatic evidence conversely suggests that Numerian achieved success over the Sasanians in 284. The Byzantine accounts of further conflict are usually not held to be credible by scholars. Some scholars also believe the relief at Naqsh-e Rostam represents a Sasanian claim of victory following the withdrawal of the Roman forces, though this interpretation is disputed and the identification of the relief with Bahram II's reign is uncertain.

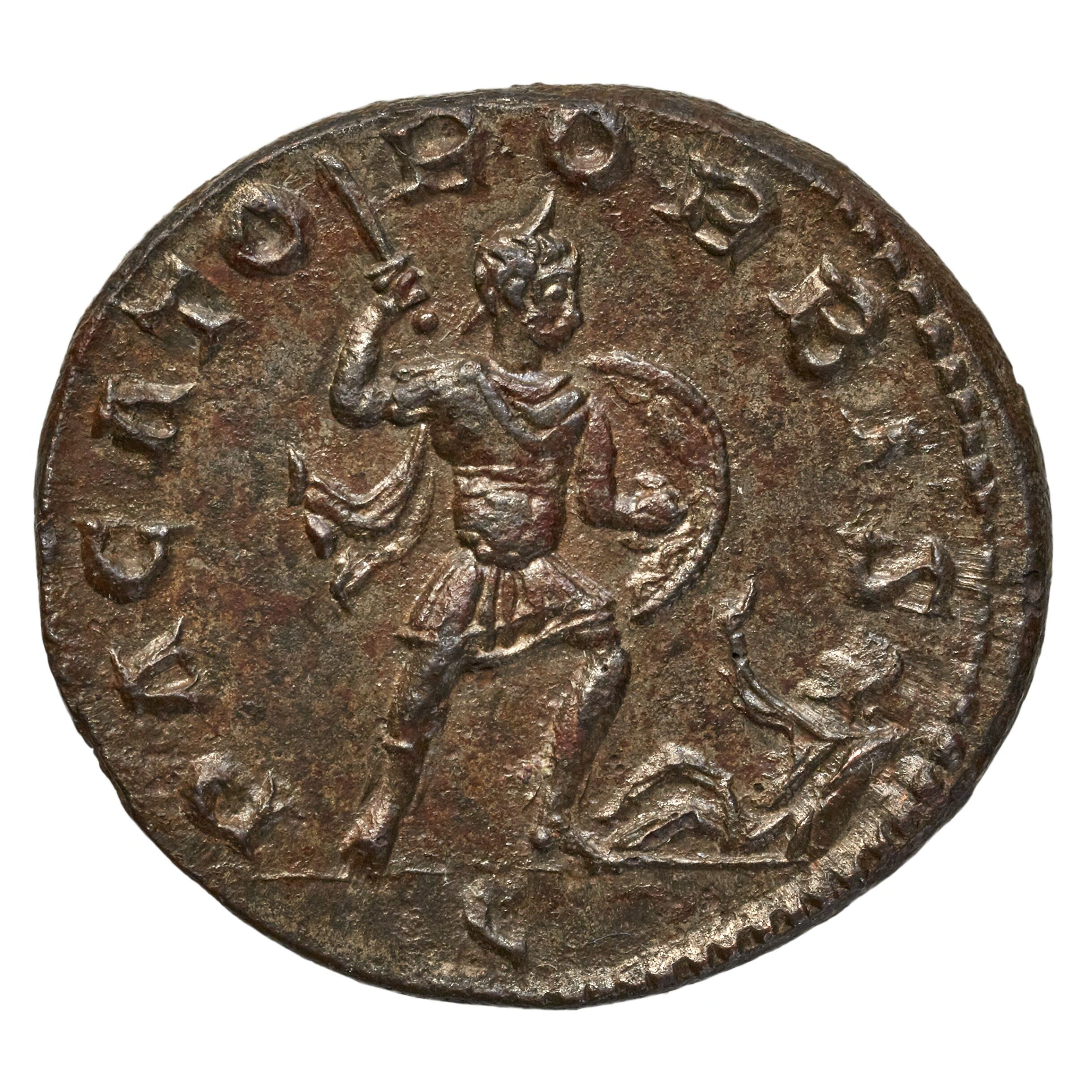
Coin depicting Numerian over defeated enemy, bearing the reverse legend PACATOR ORBIS (pacifier of the world). Minted the summer of 284 at Lugdunum.

Late in 284, Numerian travelled west accompanied by the forces employed during the campaign. Due to an eye ailment he moved slowly in a closed and curtained litter. As the army approached Chalcedon in Bithynia, Numerian died. According to most of the literary sources, he was murdered by his father-in-law, Aper. Several sources report that his death was initially concealed and only discovered once the stench of his decomposing body began to emanate from his litter. After Numerian's death was officially announced to the army, his leading officers elected not to recognise Carinus as Augustus any longer. With the army assembled in Nicomedia on 20 November, Diocletian was proclaimed emperor and Aper executed. While Numerian's death by Aper is often considered credible by scholars, his culpability is commonly questioned.

== Aftermath ==
Some months after Carus' advance on Ctesiphon, Carinus also assumed the title Persicus Maximus. Later in 283, he travelled from Rome to Pannonia which was threatened by the Germanic Quadi. In early 284, Carinus and Numerian both adopted the title Britannicus Maximus, likely relating to disturbances in Britain. Following his success against the Quadi, Carinus may have remained in Illyria in anticipation of reuniting with his brother on his return from the east. When he learned of Numerian's death and Diocletian's usurpation, his first move was likely to Gaul to mobilise additional forces.

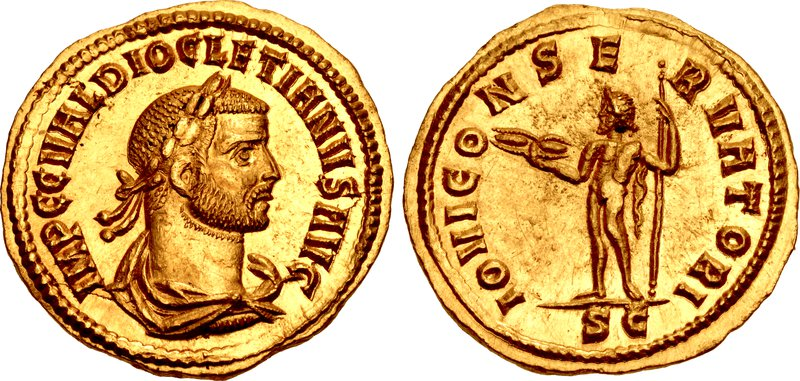
Aureus of Diocletian, c. AD 287. Minted at Cyzicus.

Meanwhile, to the east, Diocletian marched westward along the Danube at the head of the eastern army. A succession war followed, which saw Carinus defeat another rival, Sabinus Julianus, before he was also killed in summer 285. Numerian's withdrawal was not accompanied by a treaty, leaving relations between Rome and the Sasanians uncertain until Diocletian's return to the east in 286. He negotiated a peace with the Sasanians in 287–88 which saw pro-Roman Tiridates III installed in a possibly-partitioned Armenia, though this reconstruction has been disputed. Rome claimed victory in the negotiations. The settlement in 287 did not long hold, however, as conflict with the Sasanians resumed some nine years later in 296.

Carus' campaign followed the military successes of his predecessors on the frontiers and within the empire's interior, forming an episode of recovery for Rome that had been underway from the reign of Gallienus. In light of previous defeats against the Sasanians, it was celebrated across the empire and judged by later writers equal to the Parthian campaigns of Trajan, Verus, and Severus. The account of Carus' apparent death by lightning had equally lasting impact in Roman memory, gaining greater fame over the next century. But with the Romans' swift withdrawal following his death, without any negotiations or the conclusion of a treaty, the state of relations between the two powers remained unchanged.

Whether Carus' victories led to the favourable Diocletianic settlement in 287 is unclear: Bahram II in the early 280s continued to face rebellion in the Sasanian east and he may have given concessions to Rome for a free hand against the rebels. Persian instability remained a feature of the period until the accession of Narseh in 293, returning Sasanian interests to the west. The acclamation of Diocletian, however, changed Roman policy in the east and led to a reorganisation of the frontiers. Following Narseh's defeat to Galerius, Rome's increasingly secure eastern position culminated in a peace with the Sasanians that would last decades into the fourth century.

== Bibliography ==
=== Secondary sources ===
- Altmayer, Klaus (2014). Die Herrschaft des Carus, Carinus und Numerianus als Vorläufer der Tetrarchie. Stuttgart: Franz Steiner Verlag. ISBN 978-3-515-10621-4.
- Bird, H. W. (1976). Diocletian and the Deaths of Carus, Numerian and Carinus. Latomus. Vol. 35. Societe d'Etudes Latines de Bruxelles. pp. 123–132. JSTOR 41533488.
- Bleckmann, Bruno (1992). Die Reichskrise des III. Jahrhunderts in der spätantiken und byzantinischen Geschichtsschreibung: Untersuchungen zu den nachdionischen Quellen der Chronik des Johannes Zonaras. München: Tuduv. ISBN 3-88073-441-0.
- Daryaee, Touraj (2009). Sasanian Persia: the rise and fall of an Empire. International Library of Iranian Studies. London: I B Tauris. ISBN 978-1-85043-898-4.
- de Blois, Lukas (2019). Image and Reality of Roman Imperial power in the third century AD: The impact of War. Routledge. ISBN 978-0-8153-5373-7.
- Dignas, Beate; Winter, Engelbert (2007). Rome and Persia in Late Antiquity: Neighbours and Rivals. Cambridge University Press. ISBN 978-0-521-84925-8.
- Drinkwater, John (2005). "Maximinus to Diocletian and the 'Crisis'". In Bowman, Alan K.; Garnsey, Peter; Cameron, Averil (eds.). The Cambridge Ancient History, Volume XII: The Crisis of Empire, A.D. 193–337. Cambridge: Cambridge University Press. pp. 28–66. ISBN 978-0-521-30199-2.
- Edwell, Peter M (2021). Rome and Persia at war: Imperial competition and contact, 193–363 CE. Routledge. ISBN 978-1-4724-1817-3.
- Frye, Richard (2005). "The Sassanians". In Bowman, Alan K.; Garnsey, Peter; Cameron, Averil (eds.). The Cambridge Ancient History, Volume XII: The Crisis of Empire, A.D. 193–337. Cambridge: Cambridge University Press. pp. 461–480. ISBN 978-0-521-30199-2.
- Hartmann, Udo (2022). "Chapter 2: Der Blitzschlag am Tigris. Überlegungen zum rätselhaften Tod des Carus in Persien". In Goltz, Andreas; Schlange-Schöningen, Heinrich (eds.). Das Zeitalter Diokletians und Konstantins Bilanz und Perspektiven der Forschung. Festschrift für Alexander Demandt. Böhlau Köln. pp. 21–72. ISBN 978-3-412-52519-4.
- Hellström, Monica (2023-03-22). "Diocletian, Roman emperor, 284–313 CE". Oxford Classical Dictionary. Oxford University Press. doi:10.1093/acrefore/9780199381135.013.2187. ISBN 978-0-19-938113-5.
- Kreucher, Gerald (2003). Der Kaiser Marcus Aurelius Probus und seine Zeit. Franz Steiner Verlag. ISBN 3-515-08382-0.
- Kreucher, Gerald (2008). "2.7 Probus und Carus". In Johne, Klaus-Peter; Hartmann, Udo; Gerhardt, Thomas (eds.). Die Zeit der Soldaten-Kaiser: Krise und Transformation des Römischen Reiches im 3. Jahrhundert n. Chr. (235-284). Berlin: Akademie Verlag. pp. 395–426. ISBN 978-3-05-004529-0.
- Luther, Andreas (2006). "Roms mesopotamische Provinzen nach der Gefangennahme Valerians (260)". In Wiesehöfer, Josef; Huyse, Philip (eds.). Ērān ud Anērān: Studien zu den Beziehungen zwischen dem Sasanidenreich und der Mittelmeerwelt. Franz Steiner Verlag. pp. 203–219. ISBN 978-3-515-08829-9.
- Millar, Fergus (1993). The Roman Near East, 31 B.C.-A.D. 337. Harvard University Press. ISBN 0-674-77886-3.
- Potter, David Stone (2004). The Roman Empire at bay, AD 180–395. Routledge History of the Ancient World. Routledge. ISBN 978-0-415-10058-8.
- Shahbazi, A. Shapur (2004). "Hormozd Kusansah". Encyclopaedia Iranica.
- Southern, Patricia (2001). The Roman Empire from Severus to Constantine. Routledge. ISBN 0-415-23943-5.
- Weber, Ursula (2016). "Narseh". Encyclopaedia Iranica.
- Wilkes, John (2005). "Provinces and Frontiers". In Bowman, Alan K.; Garnsey, Peter; Cameron, Averil (eds.). The Cambridge Ancient History, Volume XII: The Crisis of Empire, A.D. 193–337. Cambridge: Cambridge University Press. pp. 212–268. ISBN 978-0-521-30199-2.
- Williams, Stephen (2000) [first published 1985]. Diocletian and the Roman recovery. Routledge. ISBN 0-415-91827-8.

=== Primary sources ===
- Aurelius Victor (1994) [4th century AD]. Liber De Caesaribus. Translated by Bird, HW. Liverpool: Liverpool University Press.
- Nemesianus (1935) [283-284 AD]. Cynegetica. Loeb Classical Library. Translated by Duff, J. Wight; Duff, Arnold M. – via LacusCurtius.
- Anonymous (1932) [c. 4th century AD]. "The Lives of Carus, Carinus and Numerian". Historia Augusta. Loeb Classical Library. Vol. 3. Translated by Magie, David – via LacusCurtius.
- Eutropius (1884) [4th century AD]. "Abridgement of Roman History". Justin, Cornelius Nepos, and Eutropius. Translated by Watson, John Selby. London: George Bell & Sons.
- Anonymous (1994) [291 AD]. "XI Genethliacus of Maximiam Augustus". Praise of Later Roman Emperors: The Panegyrici Latini. Translated by Nixon, C.E.V.; Rogers, Barbara Saylor. Berkeley: University of California Press. ISBN 978-0-520-08326-4.
- Festus (2001) [c. 370 AD]. Breviarium rerum gestarum populi Romani. Canisius College Translated Texts. Translated by Banchich, Thomas M.; Meka, Jennifer A.
- Ammianus Marcellinus (1939–1950) [4th century AD]. Res Gestae. Loeb Classical Library. Vol. 3. Translated by Rolfe, John C. – via LacusCurtius.
- Xenophon (1922) [4th century BC]. Anabasis. Translated by Brownson, Carleton L. Harvard University Press – via Perseus Digital Library.
- Diodorus Siculus (1947) [1st century BC]. The Library of History. Loeb Classical Library. Vol. 9. Translated by Geer, Russel M. – via LacusCurtius.
- Zonaras (2009) [12th century AD]. "Book XII The Epitome of Histories". The History of Zonaras From Alexander Severus to the Death of Theodosius the Great. Translated by Banchich, Thomas M; Lane, Eugene N. New York: Routledge. ISBN 978-0-415-29909-1.
- Claudian (1922) [c. 5th century AD]. Epithalamium of Palladius and Celerina. Loeb Classical Library. Translated by Platnauer, Maurice – via LacusCurtius.
- Sidonius Apollinaris. Carmina XXIII.
- Anonymous (2009) [c. 4th century AD]. Epitome de Caesaribus. Translated by Banchich, Thomas M. Canisius College Translated Texts.
- Paulus Orosius (1936) [c. 5th century AD]. "Book 7". Seven books of History against the Pagans. Translated by Raymond, I.W.
- Jerome (2005) [c. 4th century AD]. The Chronicle of St. Jerome.
- John Malalas (1986) [c. 6th century AD]. The Chronicle of John Malalas. Byzantina Australiensia. Translated by Jeffreys, Elizabeth; Jeffreys, Michael; Scott, Roger. Leiden: Brill. ISBN 978-90-04-34460-0.
- Leo Grammaticus (1842) [c. 10th century AD]. Bekker, Immanuel (ed.). Leonis Grammatici Chronographia. Corpus Scriptorum Historiae Byzantinae. Bonn: Weber.
