= Galerius' Sasanian campaigns =

Galerius' Sasanian Campaigns
- Part of the Roman-Persian Wars
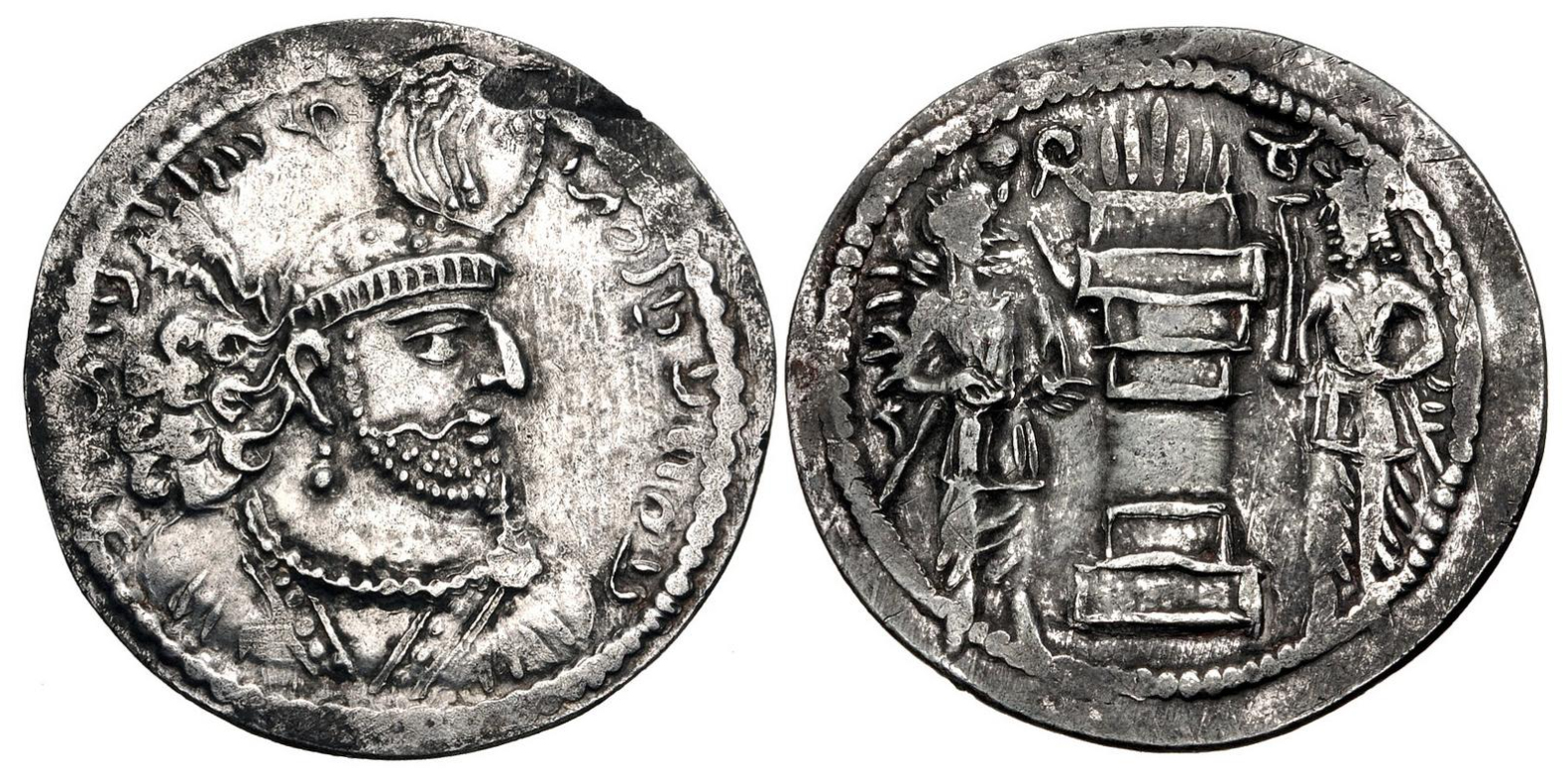
- A silver drachm of Narseh, depicting the monarch wearing a crown without branches. Modern historians suggest the branches were removed following his military defeat at Satala
Date	AD 296–299
Location	Armenia, Mesopotamia
Result	Roman victory: Treaty of Nisibis

Belligerents
Roman Empire; Armenia	Sasanian Empire; Iberia; Lakhmid Arabs

Commanders and leaders
Galerius; Tiridates III	Narseh; Hormizd II; Mirian III (surrendered) 'Amr ibn 'Ali

Strength
25,000 legionaires	40,000 infantrymen 7,000 cavalrymen

Galerius' Sasanian campaigns were a major conflict between the Roman Empire and the Sasanian Empire during the reigns of the emperors Diocletian and Galerius, and the Sasanian king Narseh. The war formed part of the long-running Roman–Persian struggle for dominance in the Near East and was triggered by renewed Sasanian expansion following internal consolidation under Narseh. Initial Persian successes, including the expulsion of the Roman client king Tiridates III of Armenia from Armenia and the defeat of Roman forces in Mesopotamia, were reversed by a decisive Roman counter-offensive.

The turning point of the war came with the Roman victory at the Battle of Satala, where Galerius launched a surprise attack that routed the Sasanian army and captured the royal household of Narseh. Exploiting this success, Roman forces advanced deep into Persian territory, restoring Roman control over Mesopotamia and re-establishing their influence in Armenia and Iberia. The conflict concluded with the Treaty of Nisibis, which imposed highly favourable terms for the Romans, including territorial concessions by the Sasanians, recognition of Roman supremacy in Armenia and Iberia, and the establishment of Nisibis as the sole center of bilateral trade.

The treaty marked the high point of Roman power in the East during Late Antiquity and decisively shifted the balance of power in Rome's favour for several decades, though its harsh conditions remained a source of tension that would contribute to later conflicts between the two empires.

== Sources ==
The study of 3rd century Roman history is significantly hindered by the scarcity of written sources. No contemporary narrative historical text on Roman history from the third or first half of the 4th century survives, and the extant texts of the period belong to a range of genres. Contemporary Latin accounts, by Aurelius Victor, Eutropius, Lactantius, and Festus, provide only limited detail about the actual course of the battle. They emphasize the capture of the Persian royal harem and treasury rather than tactical details and uniformly characterize the engagement as a decisive Roman triumph.

Two of the panels in the Arch of Galerius, depicting the battles at Carrhae and Satala respectively

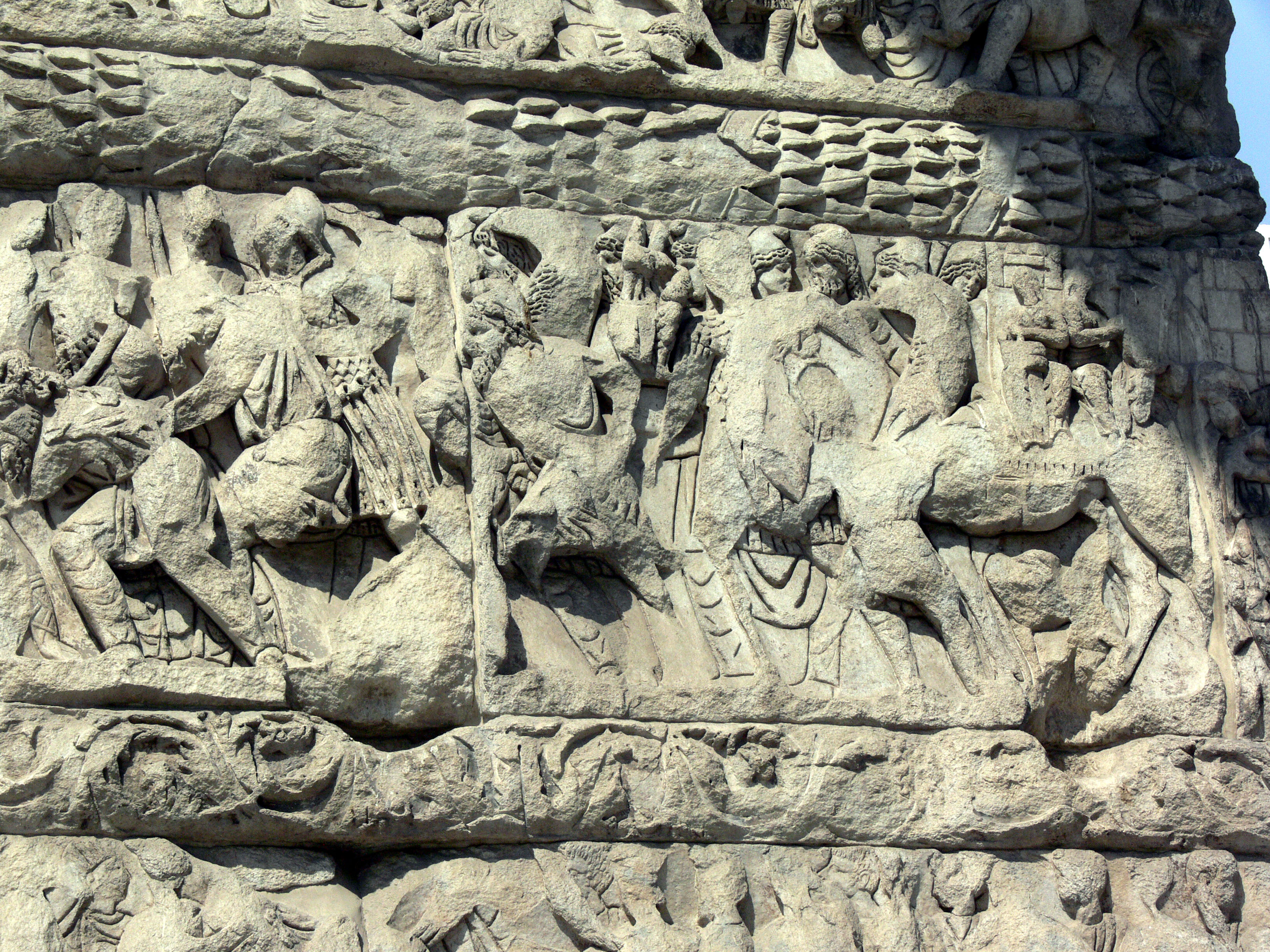
Panel B.III.24

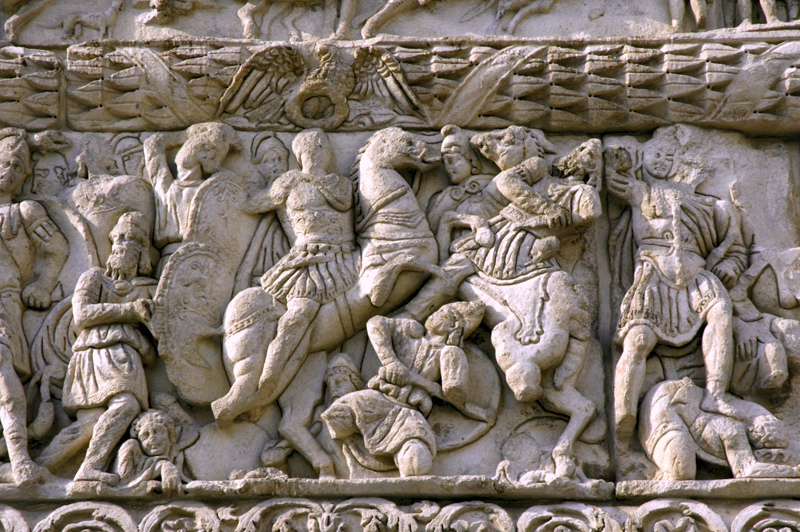
Panel B.II.20

Meanwhile, the Historia Augusta is considered an unreliable source by modern scholars for this period and is generally treated with caution. The Gallic Panegyrics, particularly the panegyric of AD 297 delivered at Trier, provide some context for the wider strategic situation of the Tetrarchy, though they pass over the initial Persian defeat with deliberate tact. The sole Byzantine source to preserve the terms of the subsequent peace is Peter the Patrician, a 6th century diplomat and historian who served as magister officiorum under Justinian I. His work, the Historiai, survives only in fragments, two of which describe the diplomatic negotiations between Rome and Narseh in considerable detail.

The most comprehensive narrative description of the battle survives in the Armenian Epic Histories, an anonymous text composed in the second half of the 5th century. Analysis of its content reveals that it contains literary topoi, notably the story of Galerius disguising himself as a peasant to reconnoitre the Persian camp, that can be associated with the heroic narratives of the Romance of Alexander and with the Iranian literary tradition more broadly. Rather than reflecting actual tactical events, these topoi suggest that Galerius deliberately shaped his public image in terms intelligible to the eastern population of his realm.

Special attention should therefore be paid to the sculptural reliefs on the Arch of Galerius in Thessaloniki, modern-day Greece, which were commissioned by Galerius himself to commemorate the campaign. Of the original octopyle construction, only portions of three piers survive, meaning that potentially only one quarter of the original decoration remains. The surviving battle panels, B.III.24 and B.II.20, in Hans Peter Laubscher's numeration (Berlin, 1975) employ heroic formulae rooted in the Hellenistic tradition rather than the "realistic" Roman battle narrative familiar from the columns of Trajan and Marcus Aurelius, and similarly resist reconstruction of specific tactical events.

== Background ==
At the time of Carus' Sasanian campaign, Sasanian King of Kings Bahram II was dealing with a revolt in the eastern half of Persia, led by his brother Hormizd, making the empire vulnerable in the west. The treaty that followed the indecisive campaign favoured the Romans, as it permitted the return of Tiridates III, a Roman ally, to the Armenian throne, while also advancing the Roman boundary toward the Tigris.

As Tiridates's restoration weakened the Sasanian king's position, Bahram sought to secure his northern flank by intervening in Iberia, a historic enemy of Armenia. He sponsored the accession of Mirian III, thereby gaining a new ally, and personally traveled to the Iberian capital, Mtskheta, to oversee the coronation. Mirian was, in effect, of Iranian ancestry, as Rapp suggests he was part of the Mihranid house, one of the Seven Great Iranian families.

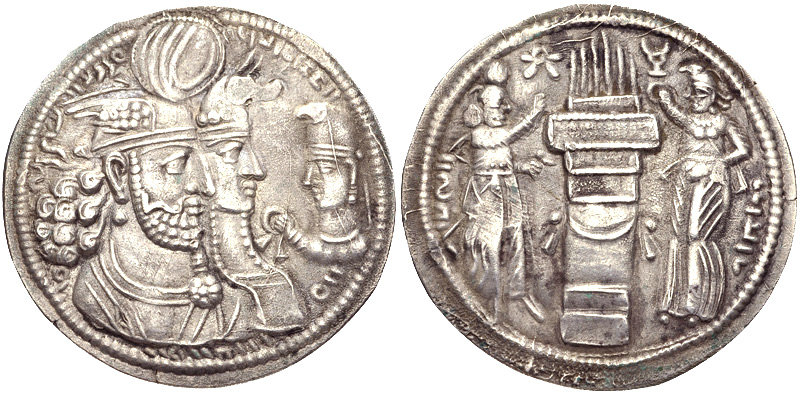
A silver drachm of Bahram II, depicting the monarch on the obverse, Queen Shapurdukhtak and an unbearded youth wearing a tiana, possibly the Crown Prince

In AD 293, Bahram died and was briefly succeeded by his son Bahram III, but opposition among the Sasanian nobility, led by the Parthian Suren and Karen families, brought Narseh to power as the new Shahanshah. Narseh's accession is recorded in the Paikuli inscription, which also notes that Rome was among the powers that sent congratulations to the new king, suggesting that at the outset of his reign relations between the two empires were formally amicable.

Narseh sought to maintain the alliance with King Mirian and to keep Tetrarch Galerius in check, who was stationed in the eastern provinces at the time. Following Mirian's marriage to Abeshura (daughter of the previous Iberian ruler Aspacures I), 40,000 Sasanian infantrymen and 7,000 cavalrymen were sent to Iberia to safeguard Mirian's kingdom against potential Armenian attacks.

Further diplomatic ties were established with the King of the Lakhmid Arabs, 'Amr ibn 'Ali, who was mentioned in the list of rulers acknowledging Narseh's authority in the Paikuli inscription. The reigns of Narseh and Diocletian nonetheless witnessed a renewed level of hostility not seen since the capture of Valerian at the Battle of Edessa in AD 260. In Roman texts and in modern scholarship, much of the initiative for this conflict has been attributed to Narseh. Only when Persia's internal struggle for power ended in Narseh's favour was the eastern power in a position to revert to the expansionist policy pursued by the early Sasanian kings. Taking advantage of Diocletian's engagement in Egypt, Narseh attacked Roman Armenia and Syria in AD 296, expelling Tiridates and reclaiming territory that had been ceded under Bahram.

== Campaign ==
=== Initial Roman defeat, 296–297 ===
Narseh's invasion of late AD 296 caught the Romans entirely unprepared. Diocletian himself was far afield in Pannonia when the attack came and had to hasten east with reinforcements. Galerius was already in the region and took charge of the initial response, but had very few troops at his disposal. Eutropius describes him as having confronted the Persians with only a parva manu (a slight force) against a numerically overwhelming enemy. Rather than retreating, Galerius advanced into Mesopotamia in an attempt to hold the Persians back until Diocletian could arrive.

Orosius records that three engagements were fought in the area between Carrhae and Callinicum, of which the last resulted in a decisive defeat for the Roman force. These encounters were most likely a series of skirmishes rather than pitched battles, reflecting the Romans' inability to face the larger Persian cavalry force in open terrain. Despite the loss in the field, Narseh did not cross into Roman territory proper; Persian ambitions appear to have lain elsewhere. In AD 297, Narseh occupied Armenia, expelled Tiridates III, and reclaimed the territory that had been ceded by Bahram II back in AD 287, including the city of Nisibis.

The tradition, preserved in Eutropius, Festus, and Jerome, recounts that Diocletian received Galerius in disgrace at Antioch, forcing him to walk in the imperial purple for a mile alongside the Emperor's chariot, has been treated with scepticism by modern scholars. A notable argument against this account is the silence of the otherwise hostile Lactantius on the matter.

=== Preparations and counter-offensive, 297–298 ===
Following the defeat, the two emperors conferred at Antioch at the end of AD 296. Diocletian remained in Syria to coordinate the eastern response, while Galerius was dispatched to the Danube to gather reinforcements. The task was time-consuming, involving not only the recall of veterans but also the recruitment and basic training of new soldiers; Jordanes additionally records the enlistment of Gothic mercenaries, which would have required negotiation. Rome's difficulties were compounded when a revolt broke out in Egypt, forcing Diocletian to march his Syrian army to Alexandria, leaving Galerius to continue the war alone.

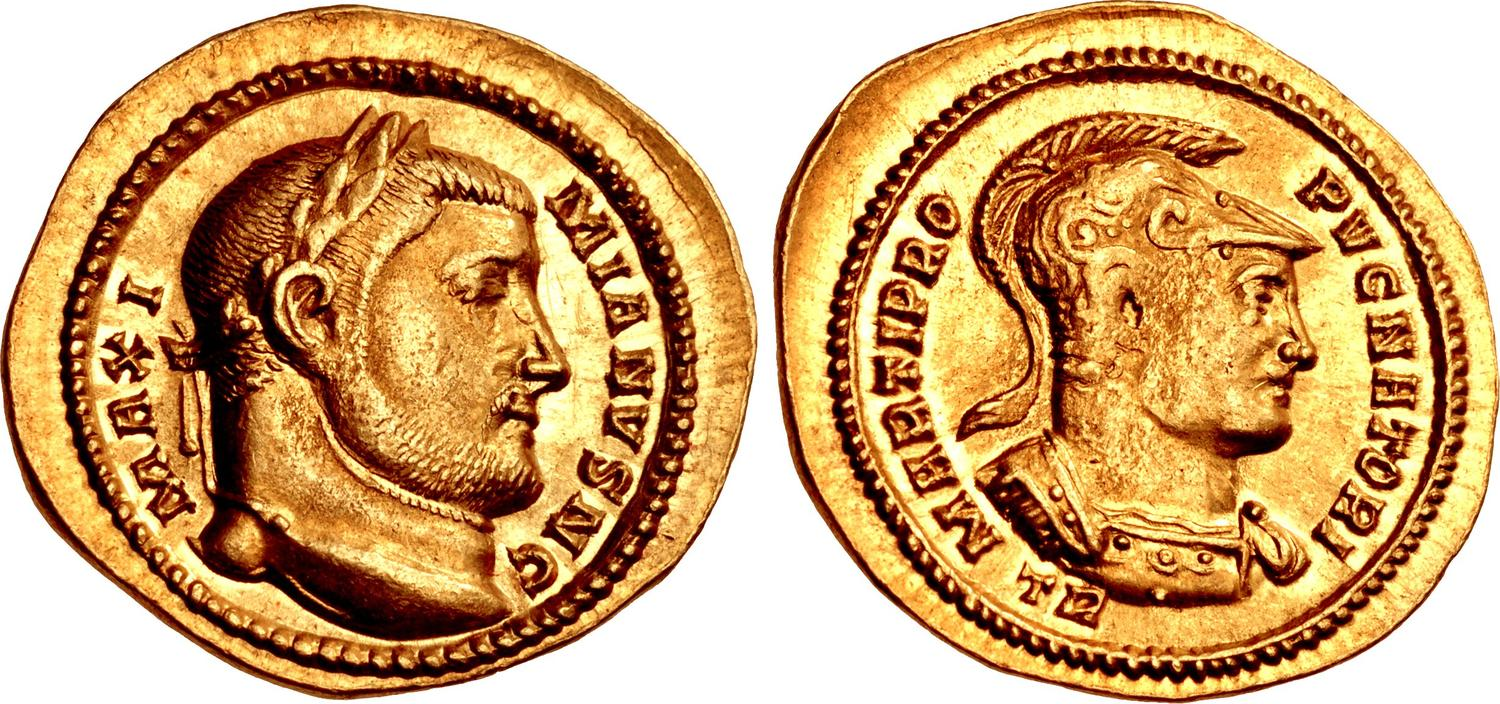
Aureus of Galerius, depicting a laureate head on the obverse and a helmeted and cuirassed bust on the reverse

By the winter of AD 297–298, Galerius had assembled an army of approximately 25,000 legionaires and positioned himself at Satala, a legionary base in the Cappadocian uplands and a logical staging point for an invasion of Armenia from the north. The force likely comprised around four legions with supporting cavalry and auxiliary cohorts, reinforced by the Armenian royal army. It is also possible that the future Emperor Constantine had accompanied Galerius in this campaign.

The Persian court, together with Narseh's household and senior members of his family, among them Shapur, possibly Narseh's older brother, who held the rank of hargbad, and a figure identified as Narseh's son Hormizd, had settled in Armenia and appeared complacent after their earlier successes. Ancient historians identify the location of the Sasanian camp as the town of Osḫa (Osxay) in Armenia's Basean province. Nevertheless, the battle is usually referred to as the Battle of Satala, but it is also called Battle of Erzurum.

Galerius chose to open his campaign with a surprise attack. Festus records the bare fact that the emperor himself reconnoitred the enemy in person with just two horsemen, and the Armenian Epic Histories elaborates that Galerius entered the Persian camp in disguise alongside two Armenian nobles, Andovk and Arshawir, in order to assess its vulnerabilities, in particular noting that the royal enclosure was poorly guarded. The same tale appears in two independent historical traditions, lending it some plausibility despite its legendary colouring. Having identified this weakness, Galerius launched his assault at dawn.

The Persians were caught completely off guard. A large number of Persian nobles were captured and, most consequentially, the royal household fell into Roman hands, including Narseh's queen Arsane and the women of his court. The royal treasury was also seized and the camp thoroughly looted. Narseh himself was slightly wounded, but escaped and fled eastward. The capture of the king's family carried enormous strategic significance: it provided Rome with leverage to dictate peace terms, and it symbolically reversed the humiliation of the Emperor Valerian, who had been taken captive by Shapur I in AD 260 during the Battle of Edessa, and whose memory had long shadowed Roman prestige in the east. Furthermore, Mirian III of the Iberians had surrendered and joined the Romans.

Based on the available accounts of the battle (Festus and the Armenian Epic Histories) it is plausible that the Armenian naxarars, who supplied crucial intelligence, played a decisive role in Galerius' victory; though the available sources do not permit a detailed reconstruction of the battle's tactical progression.

=== Pursuit and march down the Tigris, 298–299 ===
Following the victory, Galerius expelled the remaining Persian forces from Armenia and drove them back across the Tigris. He then launched a wider offensive into Persian territory, crossing the Tigris and marching down its left bank through Media Atropatene and Adiabene, taking cities as he advanced. His campaign carried him as far south as Ctesiphon, the Sasanian capital, and possibly beyond, a claim supported by the Historia Augusta, Ammianus's incidental reference to Anatha on Galerius' return route, and the testimony that Constantine, who served in the east at the time, later saw the ruins of Babylon. He may have raided as far as Khuzistan, as an Iranian historical tradition claims that he made an unsuccessful attack on Gundeshapur, an imperial residence and one of the foundations of Shapur I.

On his return north, Galerius turned aside from the direct route through Osrhoene and marched up the Khabur River to Nisibis, which he recovered from Persian control before September 298, completing the reconquest of the old Severan province of Mesopotamia. The breadth of these operations is reflected in the rapid accumulation of victory titles by all four Tetrarchs: alongside Persicus Maximus, they took the titles Armeniacus Maximus, Medicus Maximus, and Adiabenicus Maximus in quick succession.

== Aftermath and the Treaty of Nisibis ==
After wintering at Nisibis, Galerius received an embassy from Narseh led by Aphpharban, described by Peter the Patrician as the king's closest confidant and identified by modern scholars as the hazāruft, the chief of the royal secretariat. According to Peter's account, Aphpharban urged Galerius to show restraint, invoking the image of Rome and Persia as the twin eyes of the world and appealing to the fickleness of fortune; Galerius responded furiously by recalling the Persian mistreatment of Valerian. As a Caesar, Galerius lacked the authority to conclude a formal peace treaty, that prerogative rested with Diocletian, and the encounter likely resulted only in an informal truce that permitted subsequent negotiations to proceed.

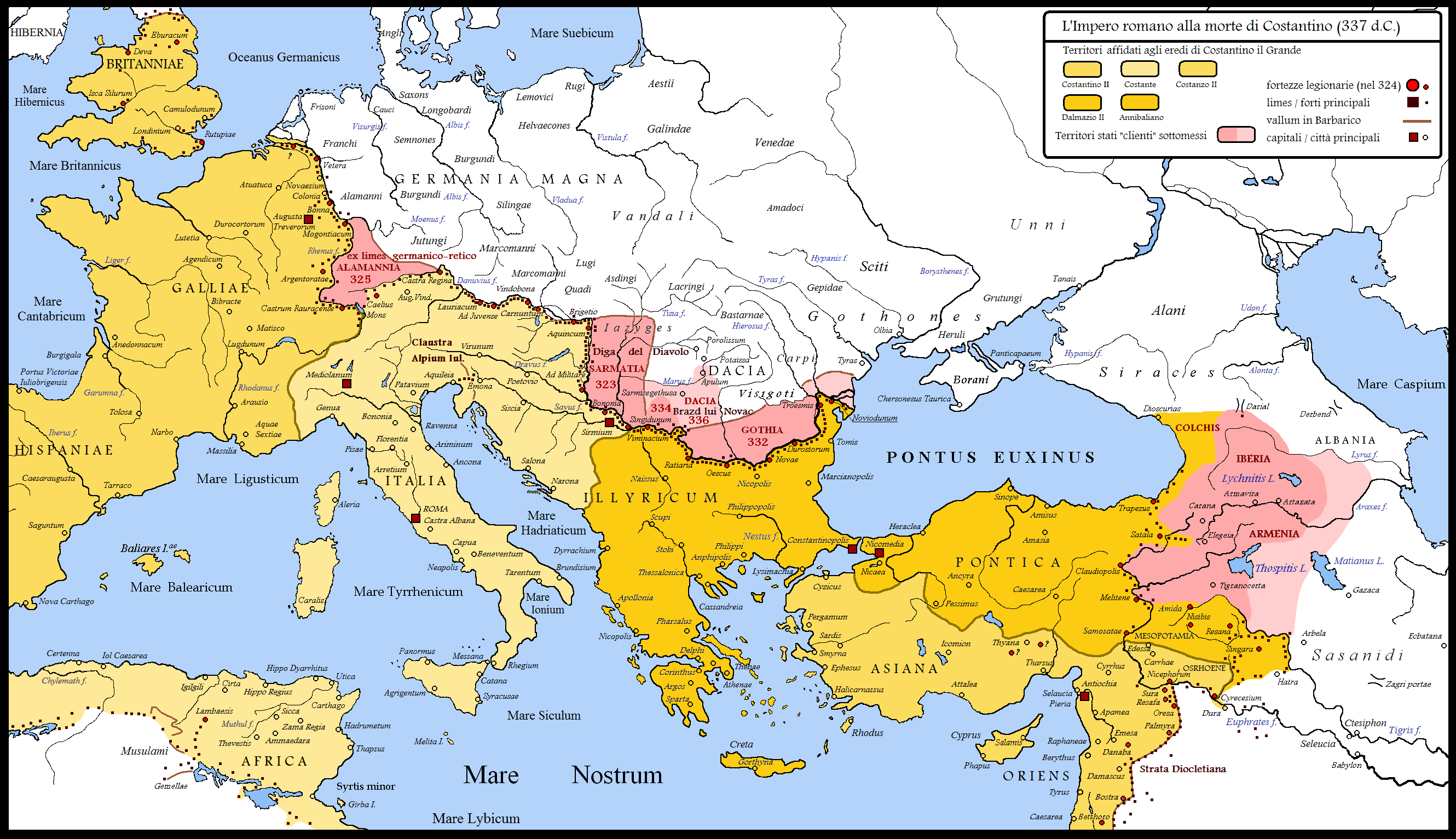
A map of the Roman Empire at the time of Constantine the Great's death; the territories in pink in the east rapresent Galerius' reconquests after the Battle of Satala and the Treaty of Nisibis

Diocletian completed the reconquest of Egypt in mid AD 298 and was back in Antioch by 5 February 299. He then traveled to Nisibis, where he conferred with Galerius, and dispatched his magister memoriae, Sicorius Probus, to present the Roman terms to Narseh directly. The Roman negotiating position, backed by possession of the Persian royal family and effective control of Mesopotamia, left Narseh with no room for manoeuvre. Peter the Patrician records that when Narseh attempted to object to just one clause, the designation of Nisibis as the sole point of commercial exchange, Sicorius Probus replied that he had no authority to alter any of the terms, and Narseh acquiesced.

The peace terms, as preserved by Peter the Patrician, required Narseh to cede Roman suzerainty over the Armenian principalities of Ingilene, Sophene, Arzanene, Corduene, and Zabdicene; to recognize the Tigris as the border between the two states in the south; to accept the fort of Zintha on the border of Media Atropatene as the boundary of Armenia; to acknowledge Roman suzerainty over Iberia; and to accept Nisibis as the sole designated point of Sasanian–Roman trade. In exchange, Narseh received back his family, who had been held honourably at Daphne near Antioch throughout the negotiations. The treaty achieved for Rome the maximum it would ever again claim in the east, short of the outright conquest of Persia, and its terms simmered as a source of Persian grievance for over three decades before erupting into renewed war under Shapur II.

== Bibliography ==
- Alram, Michael (2008). "Early Sasanian Coinage". In Curtis, Vesta Sarkhosh; Stewart, Sarah (eds.). The Sasanian Era: The Idea of Iran. I. B. Tauris. pp. 17–30. ISBN 978-1-84511-690-3.
- Barnes, Timothy David (1982). The New Empire of Diocletian and Constantine. Harvard University Press. ISBN 978-0-674-61126-9.
- Bleckmann, Bruno (2022). "Der Bericht des Petros Patrikios über den Frieden von 298" [Petros Patrikios' Report on the Peace of 298]. In Goltz, Andreas; Schlange-Schöningen, Heinrich (eds.). Das Zeitalter Diokletians und Konstantins: Bilanz und Perspektiven der Forschung [The Age of Diocletian and Constantine: Research Review and Perspectives]. Böhlau Verlag. pp. 73–90. ISBN 978-3-412-52519-4.
- Dignas, Beate; Winter, Engelbert (2007). Rome and Persia in Late Antiquity: Neighbours and Rivals. Cambridge University Press. ISBN 978-0-521-61407-8.
- Edwell, Peter (2021). Rome and Persia at War: Imperial Competition and Contact, 193–363 CE. Routledge. ISBN 978-0-367-55952-6.
- Kolb, Frank (1987). Diocletian und die Erste Tetrarchie: Improvisation oder Experiment in der Organisation Monarchischer Herrschaft? [Diocletian and the First Tetrarchy: Improvisation or Experiment in the Organization of Monarchical Rule?]. Walter de Gruyter. ISBN 978-3-110-84650-8.
- Leadbetter, William Lewis (2009). Galerius and the Will of Diocletian. Roman Imperial Biographies. Taylor & Francis. ISBN 978-1-135-26132-0.
- Maksymiuk, Katarzyna; Talaee, Parviz Hosseim (2022). "Consequences of the Battle of Satala (298)". Historia i Świat. 11: 145–54. doi:10.34739/his.2022.11.08.
- Maksymiuk, Katarzyna; Skupniewicz, Patryk (2024). "The Battle of Satala: On the Longevity of some Topoi in Mediterranean and Iranian Cultures". Mediterranean Historical Review. 39: 109–39. doi:10.1080/09518967.2024.2369841.
- Rapp, Stephen (2014). The Sasanian World through Georgian Eyes: Caucasia and the Iranian Commonwealth in Late Antique Georgian Literature. Routledge. ISBN 978-1-472-42552-2.
- Waldron, Byron (2024). "Neglected Iranian and Syriac Evidence on the Persian Campaigns of Gordian III and Galerius". In Kreiner, Jared; Wrightson, Graham (eds.). Ancient Warfare, Volume II: Introducing Current Research. Cambridge University Press. pp. 227–53. ISBN 978-1-5275-7035-1.
