= Siege of Ctesiphon (263) =

Part of the Roman–Persian Wars

- Part of Odaenathus' Sasanian campaigns
Date	263
Location	Ctesiphon, (present day Iraq)
Result	Sasanian victory

Belligerents
Sasanian Empire	Palmyrene Kingdom; Roman Empire

Commanders and leaders
Shapur I	Odaenathus

Strength
Unknown	Unknown

Casualties and losses
Unknown	Unknown

The Siege of Ctesiphon took place in 263 between the Sasanian Empire and a Palmyrene army under king Odaenathus (Palmyra was then a de facto allied state of Rome and officially part of the latter Empire). Following the Sasanians' defeat and evection from Roman Syria and Cappadocia at the hands of Odaenathus and Balista in 260, the Palmyrene monarch invaded Mesopotamia and stood at the walls of Ctesiphon and devastated the region around it, however he could not conquer it. The logistical problems of fighting in enemy territory forced the Palmyrenes to leave the siege carrying with them numerous prisoners and booty. The prisoners were sent to Rome, enabling the Roman emperor Gallienus to hold a triumph.
