= Battle of Carrhae (296) =

Battle between Narseh and Galerius

- Part of Galerius' Sasanian campaigns
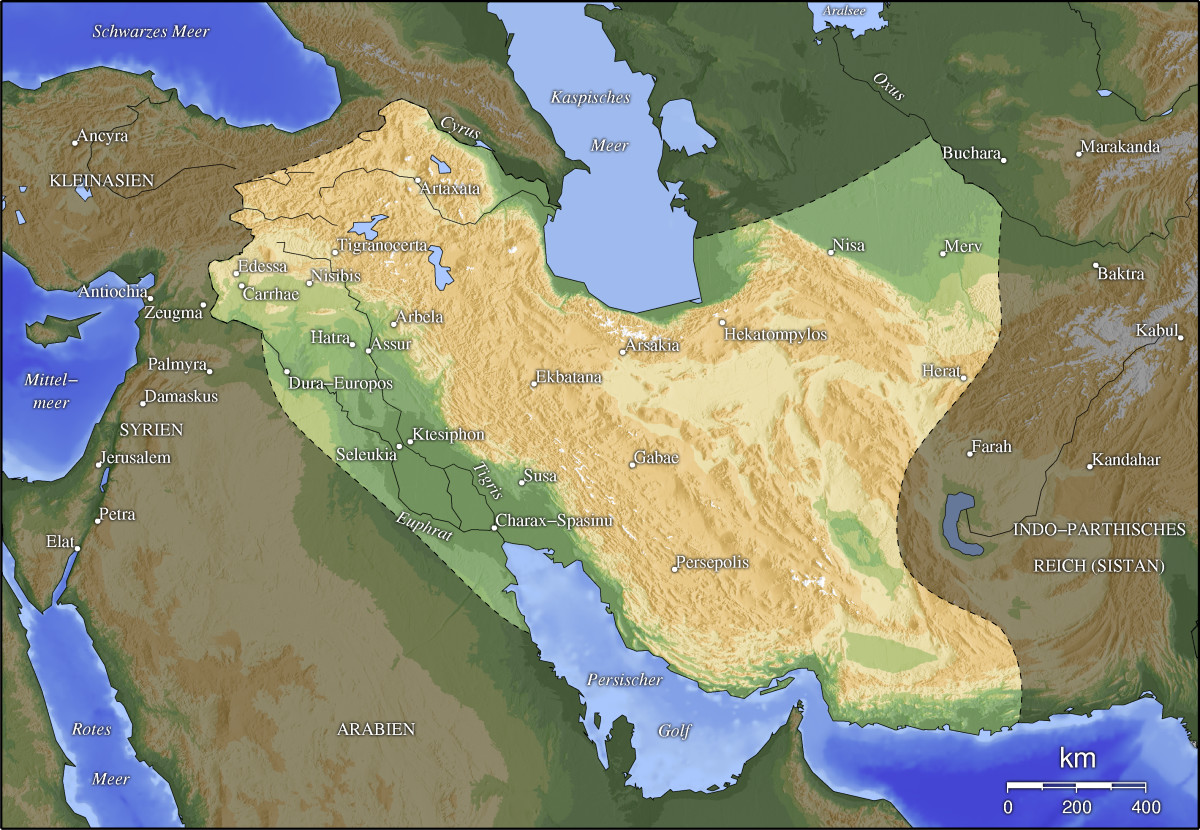
- Location of the battle
Date	296 or 297 AD
Location	Between Carrhae (Harran) and Callinicum (al-Raqqah)
Result	Sasanian victory

Belligerents
Sasanian Empire	Roman Empire Arsacid dynasty of Armenia

Commanders and leaders
Narseh	Galerius; Tiridates III of Armenia

Casualties and losses
Unknown	Heavy

The Battle of Carrhae, also known as the Battle of Callinicum, took place in 296 or 297, after the invasion of Mesopotamia and Armenia by the Sasanian king Narseh. The battle took place between Carrhae (Harran) and Callinicum (al-Raqqah) and was a victory for the Sasanians. Narseh attacked with forces recruited from the Euphrates frontier. He managed to defeat his opponent by good timing.

Galerius and Tiridates III of Armenia escaped with a remnant of their forces. Galerius met Diocletian in Antioch. Eutropius and Theophanes the Confessor have recorded versions of a celebrated story regarding a public humiliation of Galerius by Diocletian, though the latter retained Galerius in command.

Diocletian later sent reinforcements for Galerius, and the latter managed to defeat the Sassanids two years later at the Battle of Satala.

== Roman Campaign ==
During 296, a war ignited between Sasanian Persia and the Roman Empire. Shah Narseh who led the Sasanian’s invaded Rome’s state in west Armenia. This conquest leads on to Mesopotamia and Orhoene. However, despite the countless victories over the Romans, Narseh halted further conquest.

=== Domitius Domitianus ===
297 Egypt, Domitius self-appointed himself as emperor of Egypt. He received support from Achilleus which lead him to becoming emperor. This event made Diocletian leave his campaign with his commander Galerius and march to Egypt where he then swiftly took out Domitianus. This left Galerius commanding during the second battle of Carrhae which ended in defeat for the Romans. After his quick victory Diocletian then executed every traitor against his empire and slaughtered people in the city.

==== Peace ====
Narseh wanted peace, so he sent his envoy to Galerius with a message. Galerius was furious, he ignored the envoy and didn’t give an answer as to whether he wanted to accept the peace agreements. Galerius then spoke with Diocletian pertaining to a peace agreement. Diocletian convinced Galerius to speak about the terms of peace to the Sasanians. The treaty was accepted and ratified by both empires.

The message sent by Narseh went as follows:

"The whole human race knows that the Roman and Persian kingdoms resemble two great luminaries, and that, like a man's two eyes, they ought mutually to adorn and illustrate each other, and not in the extremity of their wrath to seek rather each other's destruction. So to act is not to act manfully, but is indicative rather of levity and weakness; for it is to suppose that our inferiors can never be of any service to us, and that therefore we had better get rid of them. Narseh, moreover, ought not to be accounted a weaker prince than other Persian kings; thou hast indeed conquered him, but then thou surpassed all other monarchs; and thus Narseh has of course been worsted by thee, though he is no whit inferior in merit to the best of his ancestors. The orders which my master has given me are to entrust all the rights of Persia to the clemency of Rome; and I therefore do not even bring with me any conditions of peace, since it is for the emperor to determine everything. I have only to pray, on my master's behalf, for the restoration of his wives and male children; if he receives them at your hands, he will be forever beholden to you, and will be better pleased than if he recovered them by force of arms. Even now my master cannot sufficiently thank you for the kind treatment which he hears you have vouchsafed them, in that you have offered them no insult, but have behaved towards them as though on the point of giving them back to their kith and kin. He sees herein that you bear in mind the changes of fortune and the instability of all human affairs"

== Leaders ==
=== Narseh ===
Narseh the leader of the Sasanian’s was the youngest child of Shapur I. He led as governor of three provinces, Sakastan, Turan, and Hind. Narseh later went on to become the ruling king of Sasania after the nobles didn’t support Bahram III who was the current king. The nobles instead, asked Narseh to rule which led to him becoming the king.

=== Galerius ===
Galerius was the Roman commander. He first gained notoriety when he married Diocletian’s daughter Valeria. With marrying his daughter, he was given the Illyrian provinces. He then went on to fight the Goths, Danube, and Sarmatians and took control of the legions on the east.
