= Arch of Galerius and Rotunda =

4th-century Byzantine ruins

Rotunda
UNESCO World Heritage Site
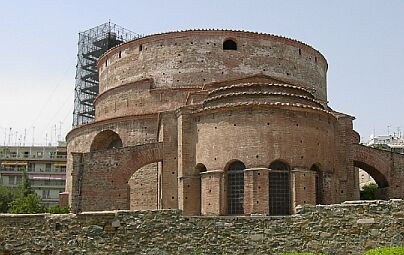
- The Rotunda of Galerius

- Location within Greece
- Location: Thessaloniki, Greece
- Part of: Paleochristian and Byzantine monuments of Thessaloniki
- Criteria: Cultural: i, ii, iv
- Reference: 456-002
- Inscription: 1988 (12th Session)
- Area: 0.587 hectares (1.45 acres)
- Coordinates: 40°38′00″N 22°57′10.5″E

The Arch of Galerius (Greek: Αψίδα του Γαλερίου) or Kamara (Καμάρα) and the Rotunda of Galerius (Ροτόντα) are neighbouring early fourth-century AD monuments in the city of Thessaloniki, in the region of Central Macedonia in northern Greece. As an outstanding example of early Byzantine art and architecture, in addition to the importance of the rotunda as one of the earliest Christian monuments in the Eastern Roman Empire, both sites were inscribed on UNESCO's World Heritage List in 1988 as part of the Paleochristian and Byzantine monuments of Thessaloniki.

== History ==
Galerius, a fourth-century Roman emperor, commissioned these two structures as elements of an imperial precinct linked to his Thessaloniki palace. Archaeologists have found substantial remains of the palace to the southwest. (Note: The palace of Galerius was built on a massive scale using primarily local materials. It may have been built over the destruction layer of a fire that cleared an area. Expansive areas of mosaic are preserved in several areas. A structure linked to the palace and called the Octagonal Room is at the southwest end of the excavated area at 40°37'48.53"N, 22°56'55.99"E; thought at one point to be a mausoleum, it may have been a monumental entryway to the palace. Beside the palace to the northeast was a hippodrome.) These three monumental structures were connected by a road that ran through the arch, which rose above the major east–west road of the city.

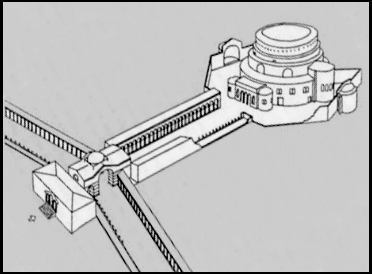
Rotunda and Arch of Galerius complex reconstruction

At the crux of the major axes of the city, the Arch of Galerius emphasized the power of the emperor and linked the monumental structures with the fabric of fourth-century Thessaloniki. The arch was composed of a masonry core faced with marble sculptural panels celebrating a victory over Narses (Narseh), the seventh ruler of the Sassanid (Persian) Empire, in 299 AD. About two-thirds of the arch is preserved.

The Rotunda of Galerius was a massive circular structure with a masonry core. It has gone through multiple periods of use and modification as a mausoleum, a Christian basilica, a Muslim mosque, and again a Christian church (and archaeological site). A minaret is preserved from its use as a mosque, and ancient remains are displayed on its southern side.

At some point, the knowledge of why the arch was constructed and who it was dedicated to was lost, as the arch simply depicts scenes from the triumph over the Sassanids and does not directly name Galerius. By the time of Ottoman rule of the region as part of Salonica vilayet in the 19th century, the arch was loosely speculated to be dedicated to one of the famous rulers people were familiar with – Constantine the Great, Philip II of Macedon, and Alexander the Great. It was sometimes called the Arch of Philip, the Arc du Constantin, and equivalents during this period. Karl Frederik Kinch examined the arch in the 1880s, and published a monograph in 1890 identifying that it was dedicated to Galerius.

In late 1864, when Frenchman Emmanuel Miller arrived in the city with the aim to remove and take to France the portico known as Las Incantadas, the population of the city loudly objected. Public outcry grew even more intense when false rumours spread that Miller also intended to dismantle and remove the Arch of Galerius as well; the arch was not touched at all, but Las Incantadas was removed.

== Arch of Galerius ==
=== Location and description ===
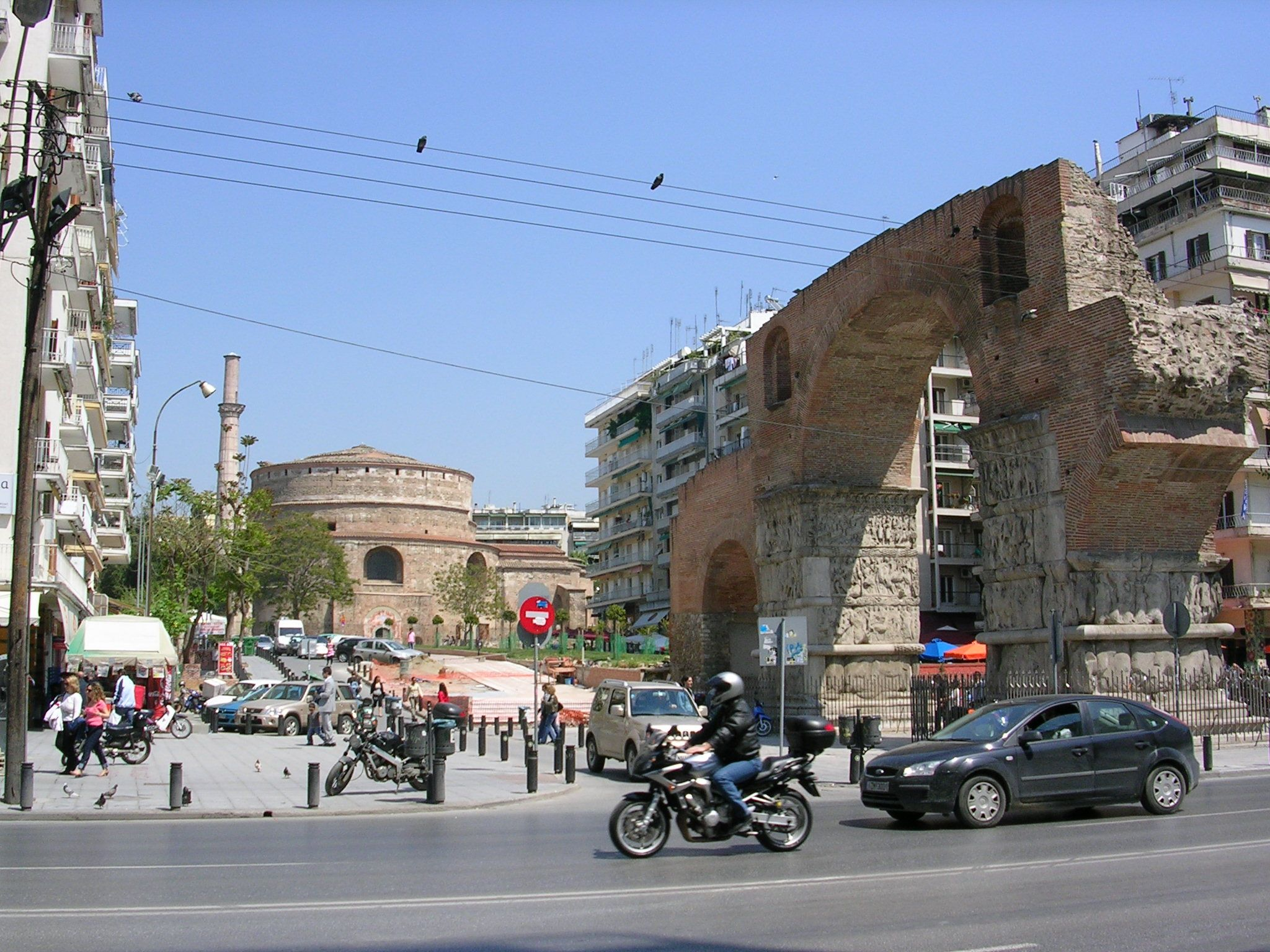
The Arch of Galerius and the Rotunda (with a minaret, added later), 299–303 AD

The Arch of Galerius stands on what is now the intersection of Egnatia and Dimitriou Gounari streets. Construction of the triumphal arch spanned the years 298 and 299 AD; it was dedicated in 303 AD to celebrate the victory of the tetrarch Galerius over the Sassanids at the Battle of Satala and the capture of their capital Ctesiphon in 298. (Note: At this point Galerius was a Caesar (subordinate emperor); he became one of the two Augusti (head emperors) in 305 AD, when Diocletian abdicated.)

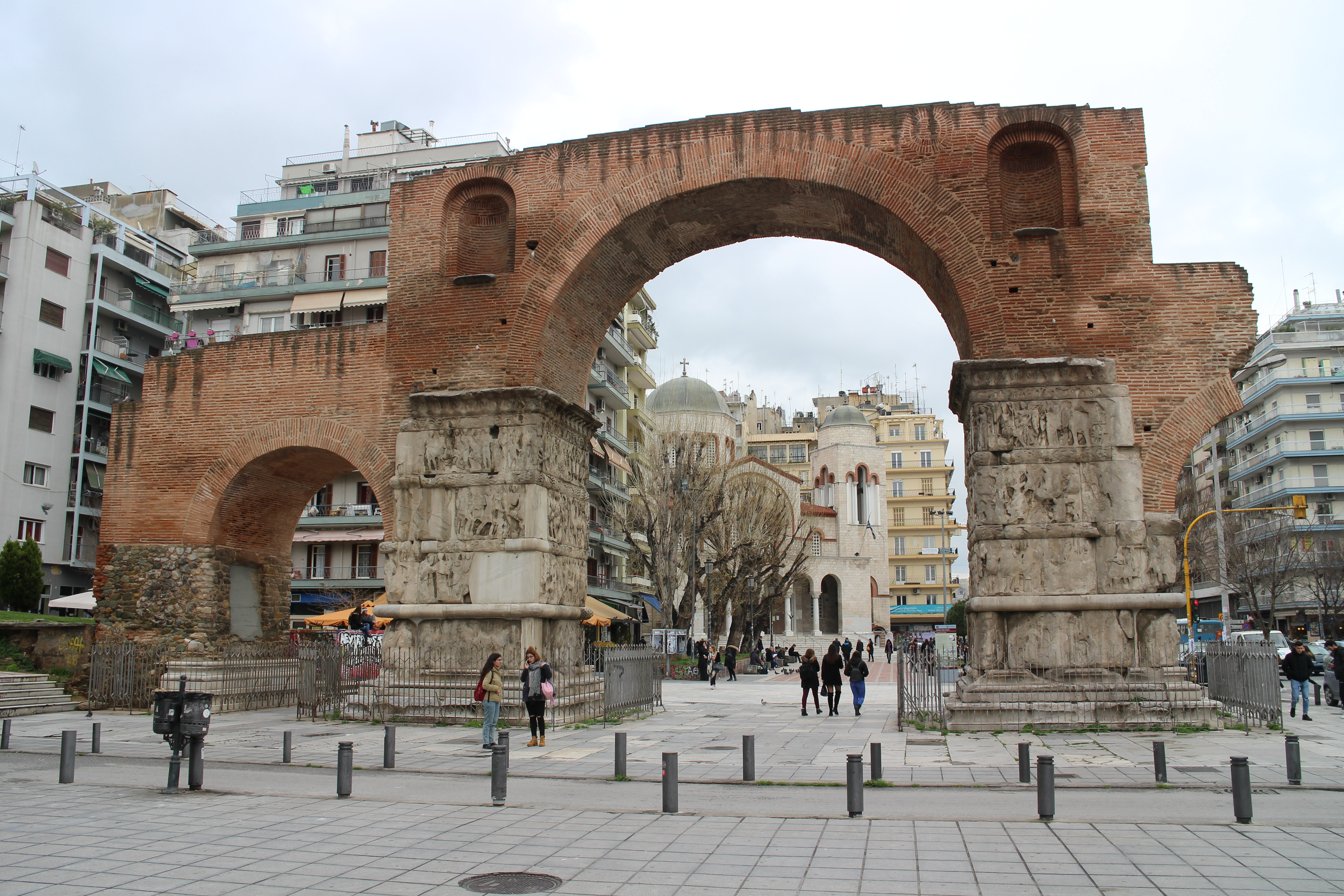
The Arch of Galerius

The structure was an octopylon (eight-pillared gateway) forming a triple arch that was built of a rubble masonry core faced first with brick and then with marble panels with sculptural relief. The central arched opening was 9.7 m wide and 12.5 m high, and the secondary openings on other side were 4.8 m wide and 6.5 m high. The central arch spanned the portion of the Via Egnatia (the primary Roman road from Dyrrhacium to Byzantium) that passed through the city as its decumanus maximus (major east-west street). A road connecting the rotunda (125 m northeast) with the palace complex (235 m southwest) passed through the arch along its long axis.

Only the northwestern three of the eight pillars and parts of the masonry cores of the arches above survive: i.e., the entire eastern side (four pillars) and the southernmost one of the western pillars are lost. (Note: The other parts of the structure were destroyed at an unknown date, probably during one of many earthquakes, which have damaged Thessaloniki throughout its history.) Extensive consolidation with modern brick has been performed on the exposed masonry cores to protect the monument. The two pillars flanking the central arched passageway retain their sculpted marble slabs, which depict the wars of Galerius against the Sassanids in broadly panegyric terms.

=== Sculptural features ===
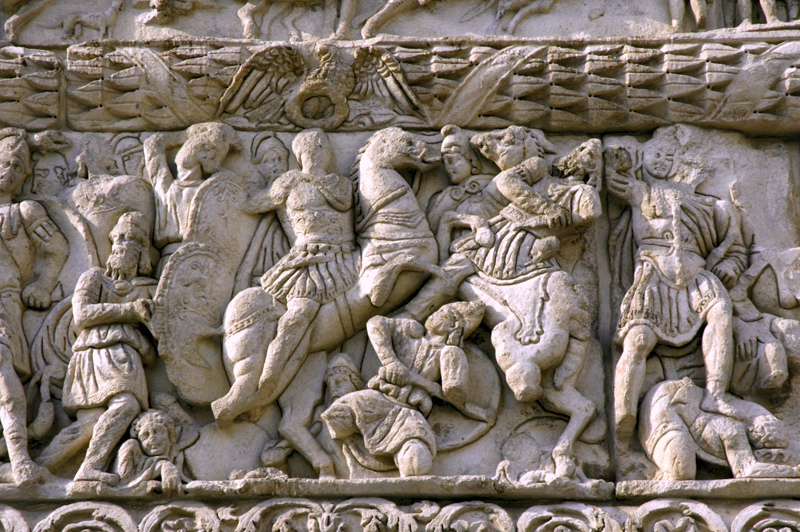
Galerius (left) attacks Narses (right)

Understanding of the sculptural program of the arch is limited by the loss of the majority of the marble panels, but the remains give an impression of the whole. Four vertically-stacked registers of sculpted decoration were carved on each pillar, each separated by elaborate moldings. A label for the Tigris River indicates that there were likely labels on other representations as the builders deemed necessary. Artistic license was taken in the representations, for instance, the Caesar Galerius is shown in personal combat with the Sassanid Shah Narses in one of the panels; although they never met in battle. On the arch a mounted Galerius attacks a similarly mounted Narses with a lance, as an eagle bearing a victory wreath in its talons approaches Galerius. The Caesar sits securely on his rearing horse, while the Sassanid king appears nearly unhorsed. Terrified Sassanids cower under the hooves of the Caesar's horse in the chaos of battle. The panel expresses the power of the Caesar Galerius.

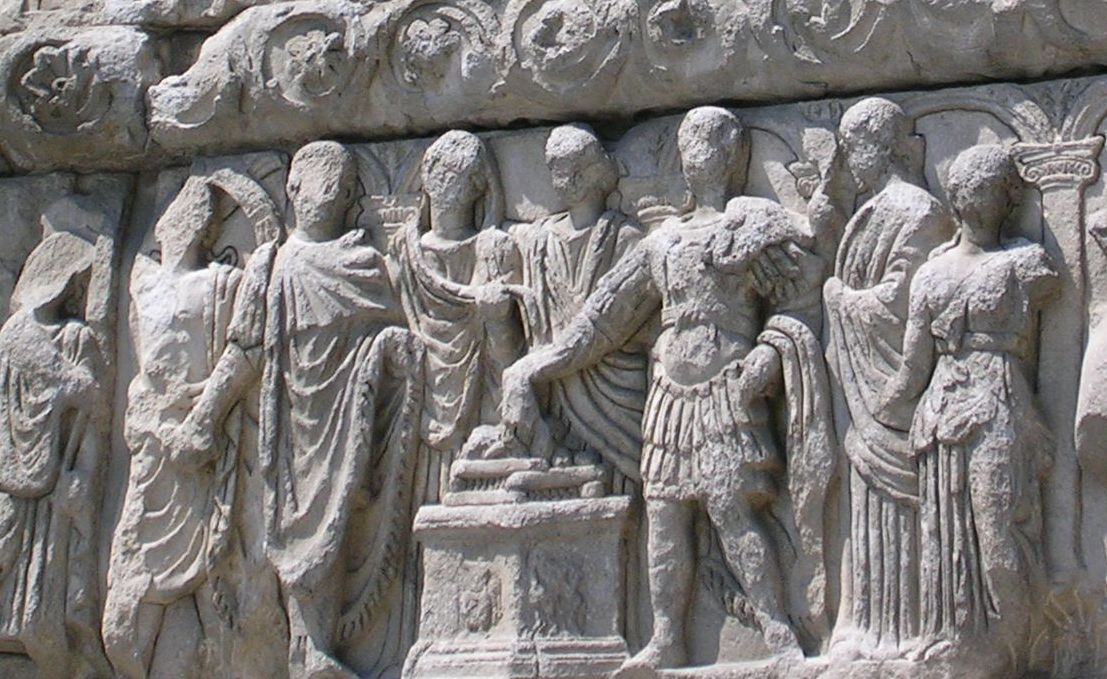
The imperial family at the sacrifice of thanksgiving

The relief of the imperial family conjoined in a sacrifice of thanksgiving owes its distant prototype to the Augustan reliefs on the Ara Pacis in Rome. Galerius' wife, Diocletian's daughter Valeria, is shown at his side, helping authenticate his connection to his predecessor.

In another panel, the tetrarchs are all arrayed in the toga as Victoria holds a victory wreath out to the heads of the two Augusti. A third panel celebrates the unity of the tetrarchy, with a depiction of the tetrarchs standing together; the depersonalized manner in which the tetrarchs are portrayed is reminiscent of the schematic statues of the tetrarchs in porphyry at St. Mark's Basilica in Venice. Only Galerius is dressed in armor, and he makes the offering upon the altar.

What remains of the arch asserts the glory of the tetrarchy and the prominence of Galerius within that system. The arch celebrates the Roman Empire as part of Galerius' victory over the Sassanid king. Galerius is also pictured on his horse at the right, while attacking a Sassanid guard.

== Rotunda of Galerius ==
=== Location and description ===
Rotunda plan

The Rotunda of Galerius, also known as the Rotunda of Saint George, is 125 m (410 ft) northeast of the arch at 40°37'59.77"N, 22°57'9.77"E. It is also known (by its consecration and use) as the Greek Orthodox Church of Agios Georgios, and is informally called the Church of the Rotunda (or simply the Rotunda).

The cylindrical structure was built around 306 AD on the orders of the tetrarch Galerius, who was thought to have intended it to be his mausoleum. Its circular, centrally-planned structure resembles other structures such as Santa Costanza in Rome and is similarly topped by a dome. The structure was converted into a church in the late fourth century and an apsidal choir extension was added as well as a wide ambulatory around the perimeter.

The rotunda has a diameter of 24.5 metres (80 ft). Its walls are more than 6 metres (20 ft) thick, which has helped it to withstand Thessaloniki's earthquakes. The walls are interrupted by eight rectangular bays, with the west bay forming the entrance. A flat brick dome, 30 metres (98 ft) high at the peak, crowns the cylindrical structure.

=== Uses ===
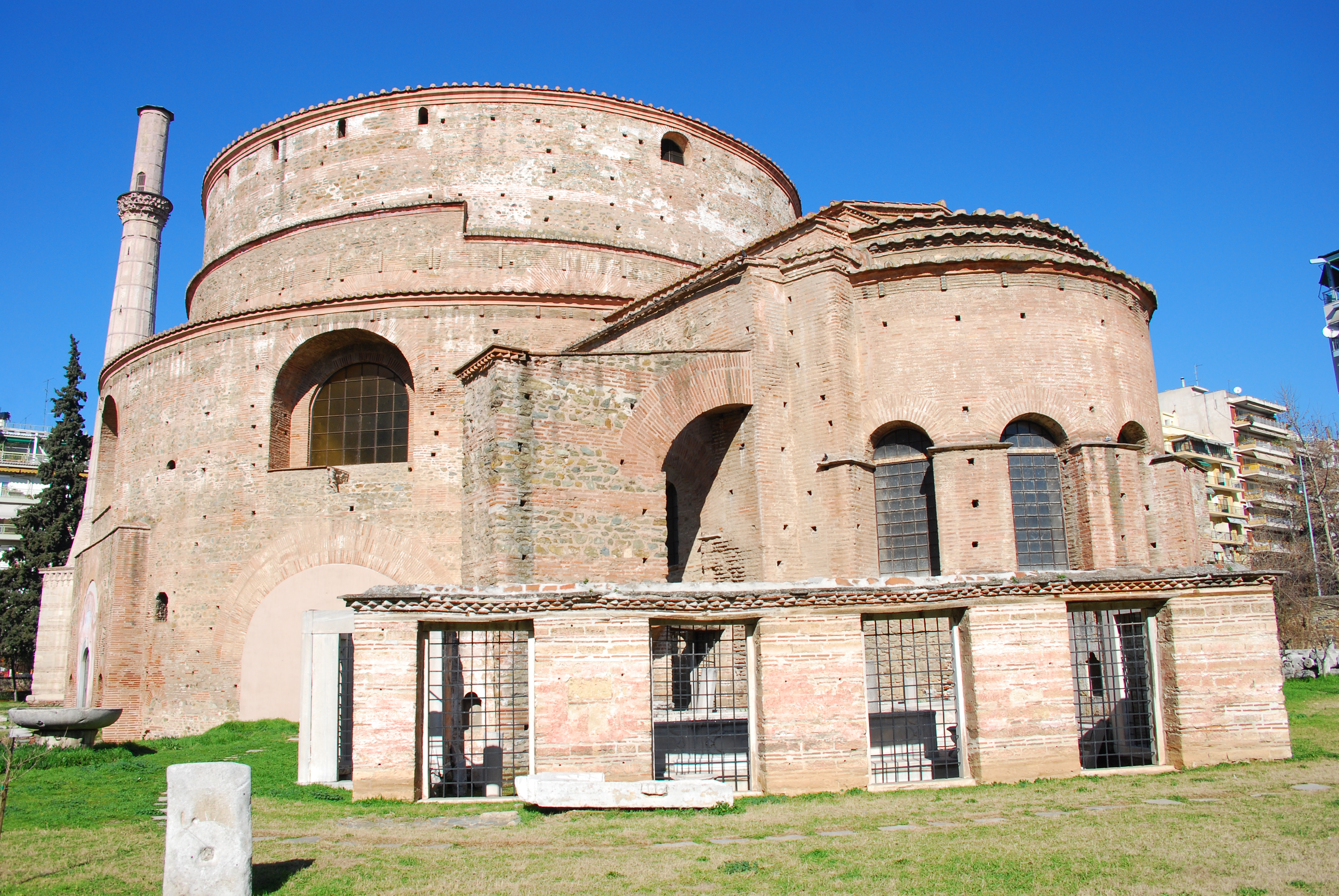
The altar view of the rotunda, initially a mausoleum of Roman Emperor Galerius, since 1988 a UNESCO World Heritage Site

After Galerius's death in 311, he was buried at Felix Romuliana (Gamzigrad) near Zajecar, Serbia. The Rotunda stood empty for several decades until the Emperor Theodosius I ordered its conversion into a Christian church in the late fourth century. The church was embellished with very high quality mosaics. Only fragments have survived of the original decoration, for example, a band depicting saints with hands raised in prayer, in front of complex architectural fantasies.

The building was used as a church dedicated to the Archangels (Asomatoi, lit. 'Incorporeal Ones') for over 1,200 years until the city fell to the Ottomans. In 1590 it was converted into a mosque, called the Mosque of Suleyman Hortaji Effendi, and a minaret was added to the structure. It was used as a mosque until 1912, when the Greeks captured the city during the Balkan War. Greek Orthodox officials reconsecrated the structure as a church, and they left the minaret. The structure was damaged during an earthquake in 1978 but was subsequently restored. As of 2004, the minaret was still being stabilized with scaffolding. The building is now a historical monument under the Ephorate of Byzantine Antiquities of the Greek Ministry of Culture, although the Greek Orthodox Church has access to the monument for various festivities some days of the year (as the Church of Saint George).

The Rotunda is the oldest of Thessaloniki's churches. Some Greek publications claim it is the oldest Christian church in the world, although there are competitors for that title. It is the most important surviving example of a church from the early Christian period of the Greek-speaking part of the Roman Empire.

=== Mosaics ===
The Rotunda's cupola and the barrel vaults were originally entirely covered in mosaics, many of which are now lost. The surviving mosaics depict many organic forms such as a garland of fruit and evergreen plants that surrounded the lost image of Christ in the cupola. The evergreen wreath is composed of twenty-five sections of branches with white lilies, laurels, pears, grapes and pomegranates. The presence of this evergreen suggests ideas of rebirth and by extension the Resurrection while the inclusion of various plants associated with all the four seasons could symbolize renewal and eternity. In the light openings there are scrolls of ripe fruit accompanied by white lilies. These fruits may symbolize the abundance of heaven while the lily is a visual reminder of Christian purity. In the strongly-colored barrel vaults one panel displays a variety of fruits including grapes, while another depicts a golden cross surrounded by many stylized flowers and acanthus leaves. Acanthus leaves are an ornament dating back to antiquity and were often heavily employed in Greco-Roman architectural adornment. Traditionally acanthus leaves have been interpreted to symbolize enduring life and immortality, making them suitable to promulgate Christian ideas of enduring life with Christ after death, adopting pagan symbolism into Christian ornament in a syncretic manner.

== See also ==
- List of Roman triumphal arches
- List of Roman domes
