= Odaenathus' Sasanian campaigns =

- Part of Shapur I's third Roman campaign
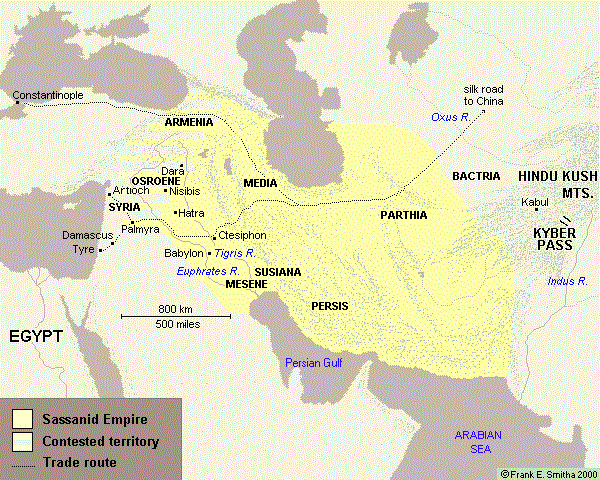
- The Sasanian Empire at the time of Shapur I (towards the end of 260).
| Date | 259–267 CE |
| Location | Kingdom of Palmyra and Mesopotamia |
| Result | Roman–Palmyrene victory |
| Territorial changes | Roman re-conquest of Nisibis, Carrhae and Upper mesopotamia |

Belligerents
| Roman Empire: Kingdom of Palmyra | Sasanian Empire |

Commanders and leaders
| Odaenathus; Balista; Fulvius Macrianus; Macrianus Minor; Herodianus; Heraclianus | |

The Sasanian campaigns of Odaenathus were a series of military expeditions led by the Lord of Palmyra, Odaenathus, during the period after the Battle of Edessa. Odaenathus, with a combined army of Romans and Palmyrenes, conducted several successful campaigns, recovering all the territory Rome had lost after its defeat in 260.

== Forces in the field and Background ==
=== Odaenathus's army ===
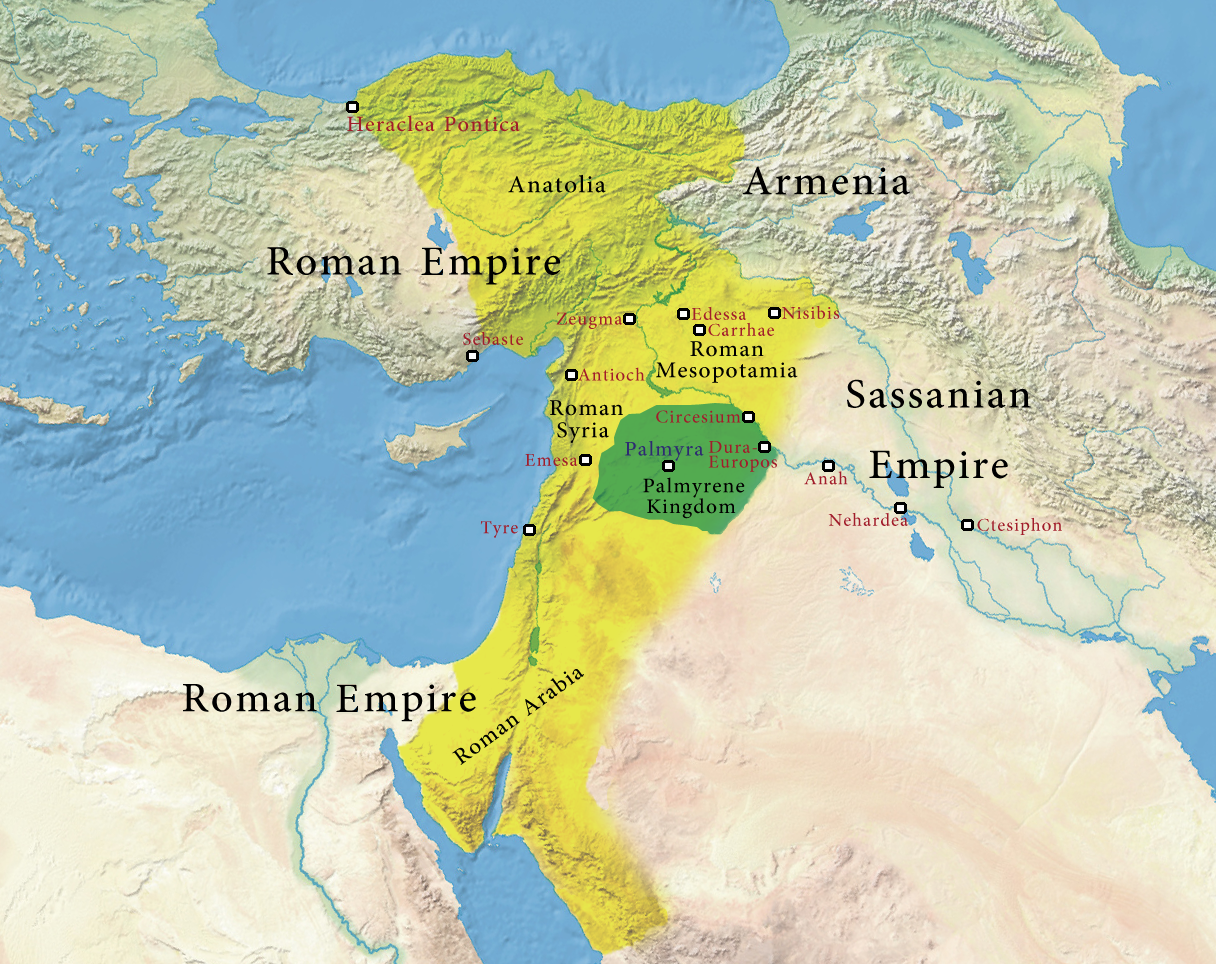
Odaenathus-controlled territories in the middle east.

Odaenathus assembled the Palmyrene army and Syrian peasants, then marched north to meet the Persian emperor, who was returning to Persia. Zosimus wrote that Odaenathus's army, with which he fought Shapur I in 260, probably aiding the Romans during the Battle of Edessa, included his own Palmyrene troops and remnants of Valerian's Roman legions. Troops based there might have been loyal to Gallienus and thus have chosen to join Odaenathus.

The peasant element in the army was mentioned in the writings of later historians, such as the fourth century writers Festus and Orosius; the latter called the army of Odaenathus "manus agrestis syrorum", leading the historian Edward Gibbon to portray Odaenathus' troops as a "scratch army of peasants". The historian Richard Stoneman rejected Gibbon's conclusion, arguing that the success of the Palmyrenes against Shapur I and the victories achieved by Zenobia following her husband's death, which brought Syria, Egypt and Anatolia under Palmyrene authority, can hardly be described an ill-equipped, untrained peasant army. It is more logical to interpret agrestis as denoting troops from outside the urban centres, and thus, it can be concluded that Odaenathus levied his cavalrymen from the regions surrounding Palmyra where horses were normally bred and kept.

=== Background ===
After Shapur I launched his invasion of the Roman eastern territories and Mesopotamia, Roman Emperor Valerian led forces to confront the Persian ruler. The Emperor campaigned against Persia starting in 254, and may have achieved some victories such as in Circesium in 257. However, as the campaign continued, his army suffered defeat near Edessa in the late spring of 260, resulting in his capture—possibly during peace negotiations. Following this victory, Shapur proceeded to invade the Roman territories of Cappadocia and Cilicia, successfully seizing Antioch and Caesarea. Although Shapur established dominance over these strategic urban centers, conclusive evidence for his penetration into central northern Syria is lacking; his primary offensive appears to have been directed westward toward Cilicia instead.

During this tumultuous period, Fulvius Macrianus, who served as commander of the imperial treasury, took decisive action by declaring his sons Quietus and Macrianus Minor as joint emperors in August 260, establishing them in direct opposition to Gallienus, the son of the captive Emperor Valerian. While initially maintaining a façade of loyalty to Gallienus, Macrianus strategically established Antioch on the Orontes as his operational headquarters and began marshaling forces to resist the Persian threat under Shapur I. To counter the immediate Persian advance into Anatolia, he dispatched his capable praetorian prefect, Balista, to lead the military response. Balista's campaign proved remarkably successful in its initial phases. When Shapur I besieged the strategic city of soli pompeiopolis, Balista managed to break through Persian lines and relieve the beleaguered garrison. Rather than allowing the Persians to withdraw unmolested, Balista pursued the retreating forces with tactical precision, ultimately engaging them in battle near Elaiussa Sebaste, killing 3,000 Persian soldiers. The momentum of this victory compelled Persian forces to abandon their positions at both Sebaste and the important port city of Corycus. Despite these tactical setbacks, Shapur I demonstrated strategic pragmatism by conducting an organized withdrawal to eastern Cilicia, having secured substantial war spoils and a considerable number of captives for deportation to Persian territories. Persian military units maintained control over these eastern regions, and when Balista returned to Syria, a separate Persian detachment exploited this opportunity to advance deeper into Anatolian territory, demonstrating the persistent nature of the Persian threat.

== Odaenathus' Campaigns ==
Following Shapur I's capture of Caesar Valerian in 260 CE, Odaenathus sent the Persian king a diplomatic message with gifts carried by a large caravan of camels. Shapur, overcome by arrogance after his great victory, was filled with indignation at Odaenathus' perceived lack of reverence and ordered the gifts thrown into the Euphrates, saying:

Who is Odaenathus? And from what land is he that he should direct this message to his master? Let him come immediately if he wishes to lighten the punishment that will befall him, and let him prostrate himself before me after his hands are bound behind his back!

After Odaenathus heard of this insult, he quickly gathered his forces and launched a surprise attack that may have defeated the Sasanians. Some historians, however, have raised doubts on the exaggeration of this event, and it may have been a more modest campaign of harassment as Shapur withdrew from Roman territory. Acting from the very beginning as Gallienus's general and commanding Roman legions alongside his own forces, Odaenathus began the systematic reconquest of lost Roman territory almost immediately after Shapur had advanced westward from Mesopotamia. His army, composed primarily of light foot archers, heavy cataphracts, lancers, and irregular Arabian cavalry, proved highly effective in harassing the Persian retreat. The Palmyrene prince defeated Shapur himself and pursued the fleeing Sasanians as far as Ctesiphon, forcing them to abandon most of their Roman spoils and capturing members of the royal family, including the king's concubines and a great amount of booty. Following his success against the retreating Sasanians, Odaenathus moved decisively against the usurpers who had proclaimed themselves in the east.

Odaenathus besieged and defeated Quietus at Emesa, where the local population killed the pretender. For these services, Gallienus appointed him as dux, Corrector Totius Orientis, Dux Romanorum, and Imperator – effectively 'Marshal of the East' – granting him extensive military and civil authority over Syria and the surrounding regions, including the capacity to give orders to governors in Syria and Mesopotamia.

Emboldened by his success and formal recognition, Odaenathus launched campaigns into Upper and Lower Mesopotamia. He may have recovered the strategic city of Carrhae, although it is debated whether Shapur had captured Carrhae in the first place, and he sacked Nisibis, although he appears to have been unable to hold Nisibis, which was possibly not recovered by the Romans until Galerius recaptured the city in 297/8. Although the exact dating remains uncertain, some evidence suggests that these campaigns may have taken place as early as 260 CE during his first campaign, around 262 CE, or as late as 264 CE. At some point between 262 and 265 CE, he invaded Persian territory in Lower Mesopotamia and is reported by the Historia Augusta to have captured several Persian satraps. It has been argued that Odaenathus exploited the absence of Shapur, who appears to have been occupied with campaigns against the Kushans and Sogdians, expanding or consolidating Sasanian territories in Central Asia, Afghanistan and the Indus region. This enabled Odaenathus to threaten Ctesiphon, but he was successfully opposed by a coalition of satraps. Odaenathus destroyed the important commercial center of Nehardea in Babylonia during 259 CE, possibly as a diversionary raid while Shapur I was besieging Roman cities, though this destruction may have occurred during his pursuit of retreating Persian forces in 260-261 CE. His eldest son, Septimius Herodianus, also achieved a notable victory over Persian forces near the Orontes River, which may have contributed to forcing Shapur's retreat from Antioch. The remarkable nature of Odaenathus's achievements led him to assume increasingly grandiose titles. He styled himself as mlk mlk' (King of Kings), apparently taken to commemorate his victories over Shapur, likely in 262 CE. In an extraordinary ceremony held outside Antioch that same year, he awarded the title King of Kings to his eldest son Herodian, whose crown was fashioned in the style of an Arsacid king. The choice of Antioch for this celebration was significant, as it recognized the city's traditional role as the governmental center of the east while asserting his position as the supreme power in the region. These eastern campaigns ultimately forced Shapur to sue for peace in 264 CE.

In 265 CE, Gallienus decided the time was ripe for a major new invasion of Persia, assembling a Roman army during the winter of 265-266 to serve under Odaenathus's command. This final campaign in 266-267 CE proved to be Odaenathus's most ambitious undertaking. Serving as commander-in-chief of the entire expedition with Roman units placed under his supervision, he achieved considerable initial success and arrived better prepared before the Persian capital than in his previous attempts. According to some sources, Odaenathus eventually managed to capture Ctesiphon itself in 266 or 267 CE, representing the pinnacle of his military achievements against the Sasanians. However, news of a massive Gothic invasion of Asia Minor reached him during the siege, and the ever-loyal Odaenathus abandoned his successful campaign to return and face this new barbarian threat. Before he could engage the Gothic invaders, Odaenathus was assassinated while en route, ending his remarkable career of victories against the Sasanian Empire. as Odaenathus was murdered. Shapur was never being able to take his revenge against him.

Evidence suggests that Odaenathus was actively involved in Roman military operations against Persia even before 259 CE. As early as 258 CE, he held the rank of consularis and bore the title of lord (δεσπότης) of Palmyra, indicating his elevated status within the Roman hierarchy. During this period, he appears to have conducted operations in southern Mesopotamia, possibly as part of a coordinated Roman campaign with multiple fronts while Valerian focused on northern operations in Cappadocia. His forces likely included not only Palmyrene mounted archers and cataphracts but also Roman troops and possibly siege equipment.

== Consequences ==
During the consolidation of imperial power in the East, Odaenathus laid the foundations for the establishment of an independent kingdom in Palmyra from Rome. It was only after Odaenathus' assassination in 267 AD, which took place in either Anatolia or Syria, that this project came to fruition with his widow, Zenobia, which in the following years also managed to occupy Roman Egypt, and part of Asia Minor. The new emperor Aurelian in 272 managed to reconquer the lost territories in the East, where the Kingdom of Palmyra of Queen Zenobia had replaced the Roman Empire to counter the power of the Sasanians.

== Sources ==
=== Primary or ancient sources ===
- Eutropius, Breviarium ab Urbe condita, IX.
- Historia Augusta, Gallieni Duo, Tyranni triginta.
- Zonaras, The Epitome of Histories, XII.
- Zosimus, Nova historia, I.

=== Secondary or modern sources ===
- De Blois, Lukas (1976). The Policy of the Emperor Gallienus. Dutch Archaeological and Historical Society: Studies of the Dutch Archaeological and Historical Society. Vol. 7. Brill. ISBN 978-90-04-04508-8.
- De Blois, Lukas (2014). "Integration or Disintegration? The Roman Army in the Third Century A.D.". In de Kleijn, Gerda; Benoist, Stéphane (eds.). Integration in Rome and in the Roman World: Proceedings of the Tenth Workshop of the International Network Impact of Empire (Lille, June 23–25, 2011). Vol. 17. Brill. pp. 187–196. ISBN 978-9-004-25667-5. ISSN 1572-0500.
- Dignas, Beate; Winter, Engelbert (2007) [2001]. Rome and Persia in Late Antiquity: Neighbours and Rivals. Cambridge University Press. ISBN 978-0-521-84925-8.
- Bowman, Alan K.; Cameron, Averil; Garnsey, Peter, eds. (2005). The Cambridge Ancient History, Volume XII: The Crisis of Empire, A.D. 193-337. Cambridge: Cambridge University Press. ISBN 978-0-5213-0199-2.
  - Drinkwater, John. "Maximinus to Diocletian and the 'Crisis'". In Bowman, Cameron & Garnsey (2005), pp. 28–66.
- Dodgeon, Michael H; Lieu, Samuel N C (2002). The Roman Eastern Frontier and the Persian Wars AD 226–363: A Documentary History. Routledge. ISBN 978-1-134-96113-9.
- Grant, Michael (1985). The Roman Emperors: A Biographical Guide to the Rulers of Imperial Rome, 31 BC-AD 476. Scribner's. ISBN 9780684183886.
- Mazzarino, Santo (1973). L'impero romano. Bari: Laterza & Figli Spa. ISBN 88-420-2377-9.
- Millar, Fergus (1993). The Roman Near East, 31 B.C.–A.D. 337. Harvard University Press. ISBN 978-0-674-77886-3.
- Nakamura, Byron (1993). "Palmyra and the Roman East". Greek, Roman, and Byzantine Studies. 34 (2). Duke University Press. ISSN 0017-3916.
- Potter, David S. (2004). The Roman Empire at Bay, AD 180–395. Taylor & Francis Group. ISBN 978-0-415-10058-8.
- Rémondon, Roger (1975). The Crisis of the Roman Empire. From Marcus Aurelius to Anastasius. Ugo Mursia Editore. ISBN 9788842593485.
- Smith II, Andrew M. (2013). Roman Palmyra: Identity, Community, and State Formation. Oxford University Press. ISBN 978-0-19-986110-1.
- Southern, Pat. (2008). Empress Zenobia: Palmyra's Rebel Queen. A&C Black. ISBN 978-1-4411-4248-1.
- Stoneman, Richard (1994). Palmyra and Its Empire: Zenobia's Revolt Against Rome. University of Michigan Press. ISBN 978-0-472-08315-2.
- Hartmann, Udo (2001). Das Palmyrenische Teilreich (in German). Franz Steiner Verlag. ISBN 978-3-515-07800-9.
- Watson, Alaric (2004). Aurelian and the Third Century. Psychology Press. ISBN 978-0-415-30187-9.
- Waldron, Byron (2025). "Shapur I, Odaenathus and Kushanshahr: A Eurasian Perspective on Geopolitics in the Mid-Third Century". Antiquité Tardive. 33.1: 241–252.
- Ali, Jawad (1993). المفصل في تاريخ العرب قبل الإسلام [The Abridged History of the Arabs Before Islam] (in Arabic). Vol. 2 (2nd ed.). University of Baghdad. [ISBN unspecified]
