= Michael Alram =

Austrian numismatist

- Born: 1956 (age 69–70)
- Education: University of Vienna
- Occupations: Historian, Numismatist
- Known for: Director of the Vienna Coin Cabinet at the Kunsthistorisches Museum
- Title: Director

Michael Alram (born 1956) is an Austrian historian and a numismatist. He obtained his doctorate in the University of Vienna in 1982, in Ancient Numismatics and Classical Archaeology.

He has been Director of the Vienna Coin Cabinet at the Kunsthistorisches Museum since 1982. He is also a member of the Numismatic Commission of the Austrian Academy of Science.

== Works ==
- ALRAM, MICHAEL (1999). "The Beginning of Sasanian Coinage". Bulletin of the Asia Institute. 13: 67–76. ISSN 0890-4464. JSTOR 24048958.
- WOYTEK, BERNHARD E.; UHLIR, KATHARINA; ALRAM, MICHAEL; SCHREINER, MANFRED; GRIESSER, MARTINA (2007). "The Denarius under Trajan: New Metallurgical Analyses". The Numismatic Chronicle. 167: 147–163. ISSN 0078-2696. JSTOR 42666937.
- ALRAM, MICHAEL (2014). "From the Sasanians to the Huns New Numismatic Evidence from the Hindu Kush". The Numismatic Chronicle. 174: 261–291. ISSN 0078-2696. JSTOR 44710198.
- ALRAM, MICHAEL (2003). "Three Hunnic Bullae from Northwest India". Bulletin of the Asia Institute. 17: 177–184. ISSN 0890-4464. JSTOR 24049314.
- Alram, Michael (1 February 2021). "The Numismatic Legacy of the Sasanians in the East", in "Sasanian Iran in the Context of Late Antiquity: The Bahari Lecture Series at the University of Oxford". BRILL. pp. 5–21. ISBN 978-90-04-46066-9.
- Michael Alram, “Indo-Parthian and early Kushan chronology: the numismatic evidence,” in Coins, Art, and Chronology: Essays on the Pre-Islamic History of the Indo-Iranian Borderlands, eds.
- ALRAM, MICHAEL; FILIGENZI, ANNA; KINBERGER, MICHAELA; KRIZ, KAREL; NELL, DANIEL; PFISTERER, MATTHIAS; VONDROVEC, KLAUS (2016). Das Antlitz des Fremden: Die Münzprägung der Hunnen und Westtürken in Zentralasien und Indien (1 ed.). Austrian Academy of Sciences Press. ISBN 978-3-7001-8047-0. JSTOR j.ctt1mtz6qb.
