= Battle of Satala (298) =

298 battle of the Roman-Persian Wars

- Part of Galerius' Sasanian campaigns
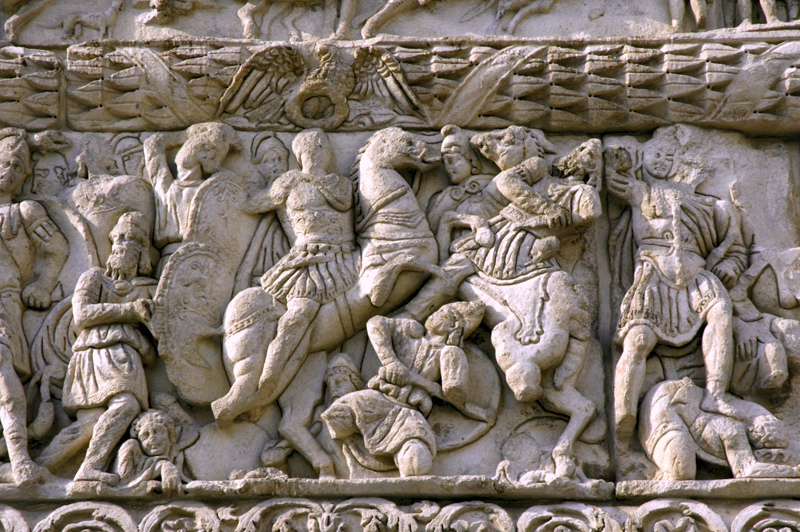
- Detail of Galerius attacking Narseh on the Arch of Galerius at Thessaloniki, Greece
Date	298 AD
Location	Unknown - possibly Basean region of Armenia (modern-day Turkey)
Result	Roman victory; Treaty of Nisibis; Roman sack of Ctesiphon

Belligerents
Roman Empire	Sasanian Empire

Commanders and leaders
Galerius	Narseh (WIA)

Strength
25,000	Unknown

Casualties and losses
Unknown	Unknown, very heavy

The Battle of Satala was fought in 298, in Armenia, between the forces of the Roman Empire under the Tetrarch Galerius and the forces of the Sasanian Empire of Persia led by Shah Narseh (Narses). The battle was an overwhelming victory for the Roman army, with the Persian army destroyed as a fighting force. The Romans obtained an enormous amount of plunder from the defeated Persians, and captured Narseh's principal wife. The campaign concluded with a very favourable peace treaty for Rome, with Persia ceding considerable territory.

== Location ==
Though traditionally known as the Battle of Satala, the precise location of the battle is not known; the town of Satala may have served as the Roman base of operations. In an early Armenian history it is stated that the battle was fought in the region of Basean, at a village called Osxay. Basean (Phasiana) is usually placed to the east of Erzerum.

== Background ==
In 295 or 296, Narseh declared war on Rome. He appears to have first invaded western Armenia, retaking the lands delivered to King Tiridates III of Armenia in the peace of 287. Narseh then moved south into Roman Mesopotamia, where he inflicted a severe defeat on Galerius, then commander of the Eastern forces, in the region between Carrhae (Harran, Turkey) and Callinicum (Raqqa, Syria). Alternative views have the opening of the war in 296 or 297. Ammianus' history is not consistent with some other sources, including Narseh's Paikuli inscription. According to historian Ursula Weber, "it is quite certain" that the whole of Armenia continued to a part of the Sasanian Empire in the 3rd-century, until it was later ceded to the Romans in 298/9 after the Peace of Nisibis.

Galerius was reinforced, probably in the spring of 298, by a new contingent of troops collected from the empire's best recruiting grounds in Illyricum. Narseh did not advance from Armenia and Mesopotamia, allowing Galerius to take the offensive in 298 with an attack on northern Mesopotamia via Armenia. Narseh withdrew his army into Armenia, which would ensure that Galerius could not move south to attack the Persian capital, Ctesiphon, as it would expose his communications, and nearby Roman provinces, to attack. However, this strategic move was to Narseh's tactical disadvantage: the rugged Armenian terrain was favourable to the Roman army, whose strength was its infantry, but was unfavourable to cavalry operations, in which the Sassanid army excelled. Galerius entered Armenia in company with King Tiridates. Local aid also gave the Romans the advantage of surprise over the Persian forces, and, in two successive battles, Galerius secured victories over Narseh.

== Battle ==
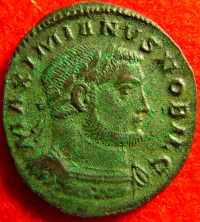
Coin of Galerius as Caesar, his full name was Gaius Galerius Valerius Maximianus - rendered MAXIMIANUS NOBILissimus Caesar on the coin

During the second encounter, the Battle of Satala, the Roman forces seized Narseh's camp, his treasury, his harem, and his wife. Detailed descriptions of the dispositions of the two armies have not survived, but sources unambiguously indicate that the Roman army unexpectedly came across Narseh's troops and caught the Persians unprepared whilst encamped, and describe the ensuing conflict as "a massacre." Presumably, the active aid of the local Armenian population allowed the Romans to approach and trap the Persians without being detected.

The Roman historian Lactantius describes the habit of kings of the Near East to campaign while accompanied by their entire household. He ascribes the defeat that Narseh suffered to the severe limitation on the mobility of Persian army that this habit caused.

According to the account of Faustus of Byzantium (in Armenian: P'awstos Buzand):

[The Romans] came and attacked the army of the king of Iran encamped in that same place [Osxay], finding them negligently unconcerned and unsuspectingly at rest. Attacking during the daytime, they fell upon the Iranian king, putting everything to the sword and sparing no one. Then they took the banak [mobile royal treasury?] as loot, the king's women, the bambish [queen of queens] and the women with their possessions and goods into captivity — their women and treasures, provisions and equipage. Only the king was able to escape by a hairsbreadth and go free as a fugitive, thanks to a swift running pony.

Narseh was himself wounded in the battle and fled Armenia into the Persian heartland, presumably in the hope of raising more troops; the booty taken by the victors was so great that it achieved legendary status and its transport back to Roman territory posed a logistical challenge. The battle was the origin of a well-known anecdote, related by the historian Ammianus Marcellinus, that a simple Roman soldier had looted a highly decorated leather bag filled with pearls from the Persians; the soldier threw away the pearls as useless, but kept the bag.

Narseh's wife, Arsane, would live out the remainder of the war in Daphne, a suburb of Antioch, serving as a constant reminder to the Persians of the Roman victory. Galerius advanced into Media and Adiabene, winning continuous victories, most prominently near Resaina (Ras al-Ayn), and securing Nisibis (Nusaybin) before 1 October 298. He then moved down the Tigris, taking Narseh's capital, Ctesiphon. Having gazed on the ruins of Babylon, Galerius and his victorious army returned to Roman territory via the Euphrates.

== Aftermath ==
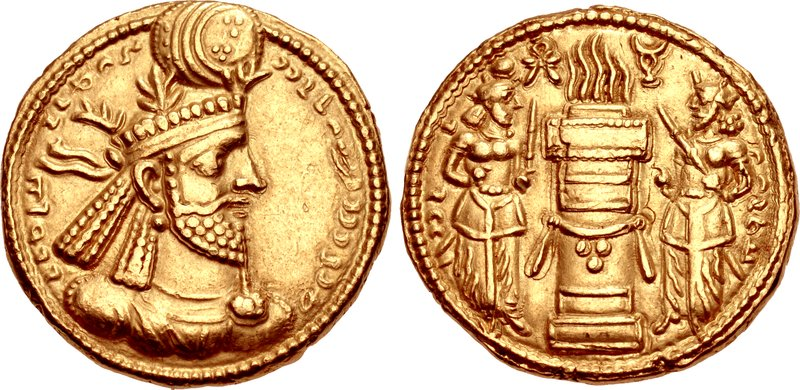
Image of King Narseh on a coin minted during his reign

The battle was followed by the Treaty of Nisibis, highly advantageous to Rome. It ended the Roman–Sasanian war; Tiridates was restored to his throne in Armenia as a Roman vassal, and the Georgian Kingdom of Iberia was acknowledged as also falling under Roman authority. Rome itself received a part of Upper Mesopotamia that extended even beyond the Tigris - including the cities of Tigranokert, Saird, Martyropolis, Balalesa, Moxos, Daudia, and Arzan. Peace was thus assured for some decades until its collapse with the military resurgence of Persia under Shapur II in the 330s.

The Romans celebrated their victory by commemorative medallions and coin issues. In 304, Galerius had a triumphal arch (Arch of Galerius) erected in Thessalonica.

== Bibliography ==
=== Primary sources ===
- Ammianus Marcellinus, Roman History (late 4th century)
- Faustus of Byzantium (P'awstos Buzand) History of the Armenians (4th-5th century) Faustus places the battle anachronistically in his chronicle, but his identification of the Persian king involved as Narseh, and his description of capture of the queen, makes it certain that he is referring to the campaign of Galerius.

=== Secondary sources ===
- Barnes, Timothy D. Constantine and Eusebius. Cambridge, MA: Harvard University Press, 1981. ISBN 978-0-674-16531-1
- Boardman, John et al. (2005), The Cambridge Ancient History, pp. 494–495. Cambridge University Press, ISBN 0-521-30199-8
- Dignas, Beate and Winter, Engelbert (2007) Rome and Persia in Late Antiquity: Neighbours and Rivals., Cambridge University Press, Cambridge ISBN 9780521849258
- Williams, Stephen (1985) Diocletian and the Roman Recovery, Batsford, London.
- Weber, Ursula (2016). "Narseh". Encyclopaedia Iranica.
