= Peace of Nisibis (299) =

299 peace treaty between the Roman and Sasanian Empires

- Signed: 299 AD
- Location: Nisibis, Sasanian Empire
- Signatories: Sasanian Empire; Roman Empire

The Peace of Nisibis of 299, also known as the First Peace of Nisibis, was a peace treaty signed in 299 by the Roman and Sasanian empires, and concluded the Roman–Sasanian War of 296–299. The border established as a result of the treaty was maintained until the Second Peace of Nisibis of 363.

The terms of the treaty are known from a 6th-century summary of its content by Peter the Patrician during the reign of Justinian I.

== Background ==
During the Roman–Sasanian War of 296–299, despite earlier successes in Mesopotamia, the Sasanian Shah Narseh was defeated by the Roman Caesar Galerius in Armenia in two successive battles. In the second encounter, the Battle of Satala in 298, following their victory on the field, Roman forces seized Narseh's camp, his treasury, his harem, and his wife. Galerius continued south through Sasanian territory and captured the Sasanian capital, Ctesiphon, before returning to Roman territory.

In 298, Narseh sent his ambassador Apharban to negotiate peace with Galerius and plead for the return of Narseh's family. Apharban was dismissed and told to await an envoy with whom the Sasanians could conclude a treaty. Diocletian and Galerius met at Nisibis in the spring of 299 to discuss the terms of the treaty. Allegedly, Galerius proposed the submission and conquest of the Sasanian Empire, but this was dismissed by Diocletian, whose more moderate terms were adopted and sent to the Sasanians. Sicorius Probus, the magister memoriae, was sent to convey the terms of the treaty to Narseh, who had taken residence in Media.

== Treaty ==
The terms presented by Sicorius Probus included:

- Cession of the five satrapies east of the Tigris to the Roman Empire. Several writers offer opposing views on which satrapies were demanded; some argue the satrapies of Ingilene, Sophene, Arzanene, Corduene, and Zabdicene were demanded, whilst others have argued the satrapies of Arzanene, Moxoene, Zabdicene, Rehimene, and Corduene were demanded.
- Recognition of the Tigris as the border between the two empires
- Extension of the border of Armenia to the fortress of Zintha in Media Atropatene
- Transfer of suzerainty of Iberia to the Roman Empire and relinquishment of the right to appoint the Iberian kings
- Establishment of Nisibis as the only legal place of trade between the two empires

According to the British historian George Rawlinson, Narseh was surprised by what he felt were moderate demands and agreed to all but the fifth condition of the treaty, and it was subsequently withdrawn by Sicorius Probus. Another British historian, Timothy Barnes, gave a different account, noting that Probus stated that he had no authority to revise the agreement, leading Narseh to submit.

== Aftermath ==
After the ratification of the treaty, Diocletian set about building and strengthening the fortifications of the Limes Arabicus and Strata Diocletiana along the eastern border of the Roman Empire, additionally increasing the number of soldiers stationed along that frontier.

The treaty ensured a state of peace between the two empires for forty years until the Sasanian invasion of Roman Mesopotamia by Shapur II in the late 330s.
