= War of Heraclianus =

- Part of Fall of the Western Roman Empire
- Map of the Western Roman Empire in 413
Date	7 July 412- 7 March 413
Location	Italy
Result	Herclianus defeated

Commanders and leaders
Constantius III; Marinus	Heraclianus, Sabinus

Strength
± 5,000	± 10,000

The War of Heraclianus was a short military conflict in 412–413, between the imperial generals Heraclianus and Constantius III, in a period known for being very turbulent and violent. There were a large number of uprisings in the Western Roman Empire and various groups of barbarian tribes crossed the empire. The conflict between Heraclianus and Constantius can be seen as one of many links in the chain of events that set in motion the downfall of the Roman Empire. In the conflict, Constantius remained loyal to the emperor and Heraclian tried to become emperor of the empire himself.

== Fragmented sources ==
Despite the historical significance of the events, few primary sources about the conflict itself have survived. What little is known comes from the descriptions of the contemporaries Orosius, Hydatius, Prosper of Aquitaine and Zosimus.

== Cause ==
Constantius was commander-in-chief of the Western Roman emperor Honorius, Heraclianus a Roman general who governed the province of Africa as military governor. The two rivals both made careers in the Roman army after the fall of Stilicho in 408 and were on good terms with Emperor Honorius. Heraclianus was the one who received orders from Honorius to arrest Stilicho. In Constantius, Honorius saw the right person to lead his army. The appointment of Constantius as commander-in-chief led to an increasing quarrel that culminated in the final conflict in 412.

According to Orosius, Heraclianus was appointed the new military governor of the North African province in 409. Orosius states that his predecessor John was murdered. In another account, however, Zosimus states that Heraclianus was the successor of Bathanarius, brother-in-law of Stilicho, who was put to death by the emperor Honorius. With this appointment Heraclianus was rewarded for his good services.

Heraclianus supported the emperor when Priscus Attalus, with the help of the Visigoths of King Alaric I, revolted in Italy against Honorius, whose seat of power was in Ravenna, in 409. Attalus then established his own court in Rome. In this conflict, Heraclianus ensured that no ships with grain left the African ports for Rome to supply the city. By restricting the grain supply, Heraclian tried to starve Rome, causing the population to revolt against the usurper. Attalus then brought an army of Visigoths against Heraclianus, but this was not very successful. Honorius offered to share power with Attalus in 410, but he refused. Attalus was then deposed by Alaric after he refused to let him lead another campaign into Africa. As a reward for his good services, Heraclianus was appointed by Honorius in 412 for the consulship of the year 413. However, the actual appointment as consul never took place, because after Constantius was appointed commander-in-chief in 411, Heraclianus turned against the emperor. Confident of his own strength and urged by Sabinus, his son-in-law, he rebelled. He declared himself emperor.

== The conflict ==
Heraclianus's first act in the conflict was to stop grain deliveries to the city of Rome, as he had previously done successfully against the usurper Priscus Attalus. He did the same with the supplies to the Visigoths of Ataulf who stayed near Marseille in southern Gaul. His next move was to assemble a fleet to ferry troops to Italy for an invasion. In the capital Ravenna, Honorius responded to this threat by declaring Heraclianus and his supporters enemies of the state and sentencing them to death by edict on July 7, 412.

Heraclianus' behavior is difficult to explain, because until mid-412 there were no obvious signs of trouble in Africa. It has been argued that Heraclianus rebelled to avoid facing consequences for the crimes he committed against refugees. However, this is based on the testimony of Jerome, clearly exaggerated and of questionable reliability. Orosius claims that Heraclianus revolted because he felt he was in danger, but does not explain the precise nature of this danger However, East has made it plausible that the rise of Honorius' new Magister utriusque militia Constantius was the cause of this.

In March 413, Heraclianus landed in Italy near Rome with an army to go to war against Honorius. He marched north along the Via Flaminia where he engaged the Roman army commanded by General Marinus at Utriculum. Two versions have been submitted regarding the events that take place. According to Orosius and Marcellinus Comes, Heraclianus arrived in Italy and marched on Rome, but was shocked by the size of the army that Constantius brought against him. He abandoned his army and fled to Carthage, where he was captured and executed on March 7. In the second surviving version, written by Hydatius, Heraclian's army was defeated at Utriculum (perhaps Oriculum, in Umbria, halfway between Rome and Ravenna), in a battle with 50,000 dead. After his defeat, Heraclianus fled to Carthage, where he was put to death by envoys sent to him by Honorius. He was murdered in the temple of Memoria. Sabinus, Heraclianus' son-in-law, fled to the eastern court in Constantinople, but was later returned and subsequently exiled.

Later historians have concluded that the departure of the Visigoths to Gaul in 412 meant that Constantius had his hands free in Italy and could focus all his attention on Heraclianus. It enabled him to deploy all his forces when Heraclianus arrived in Italy in early March 413. Modern historians such as Wijnendaele, on the other hand, conclude that Constantius was absent with his field army and that Heraclianus was defeated by the Scholae Palatinae, the troops left behind to protect Emperor Honorius. This claim is supported by the tradition that Honorius' army was not commanded by Contantinus III, but was commanded by Marinus, the comes domesticorum, the most important general in Italy after the magisteri militum. It is not inconceivable that this elite army ambushed the numerically strong African army and was able to easily defeat it due to a tactical advantage.

== Consequences ==
Heraclianus' name does not appear in the Fasti consulares, the list of all Roman consuls, because Emperor Honorius withdrew his appointment when Heraclianus revolted. Flavius Lucius is the only one recorded as consul that year. Heraclianus' actions were hushed up and all his possessions, 2,000 pounds of gold and land of equal value, were seized after his death and given to Constantius.

Despite the victory of Constantius III, the conflict between imperial generals foreshadowed what would later cause the decline of the Roman Empire. The civil war helped weaken the Roman state, causing the political, military and economic system of the once glorious Roman empire to accelerate into a downward process that led to its collapse. The conflict between Constantius III and Heraclianus can therefore be seen as one of the many links in the chain of events that set in motion the downfall of the Roman Empire. The war in 413 was part of the downfall that marked a turning point in European history.

== Sources ==
Primary sources

- Hydatius, Chronicon, 51,56
- Orosius, Historiae adversum Paganos, 7.29; 7.42.10–12
- Prosper of Aquitaine, sub anno 413
- Zosimus, Historia Nova, 5.37; 6.7–11

Modern sources

- Jones, Arnold Hugh Martin; Martindale, John Robert; Morris, John (1992). "Heraclianus 3". The Prosopography of the Later Roman Empire 2 Part Set: Volume 3. Cambridge: Cambridge University Press. pp. 539–540. ISBN 9780521201605.
- Bury, J.B., A History of the Later Roman Empire from Arcadius to Irene, Vol. I (1889)
- Smith, William (1870). Dictionary of Greek and Roman Biography and Mythology. Vol. 2. Boston: C. Little and J. Brown.
- Oost, Stewart Irvin (1966), The Revolt of Heraclianus’ Usurpation, The University of Chicago Press, 61, pag. 236–242.
- J.W.P. Wijnendaele (2017), Manufacturing of Heraclianus usurpator (413 CE), Phoenix Vol. 71, pag. 138–156.
