= 413 =

413 in various calendars
- Gregorian calendar: 413; CDXIII
- Ab urbe condita: 1166
- Assyrian calendar: 5163
- Balinese saka calendar: 334–335
- Bengali calendar: −181 – −180
- Berber calendar: 1363
- Buddhist calendar: 957
- Burmese calendar: −225
- Byzantine calendar: 5921–5922
- Chinese calendar: 壬子年 (Water Rat); 3110 or 2903 — to — 癸丑年 (Water Ox); 3111 or 2904
- Coptic calendar: 129–130
- Discordian calendar: 1579
- Ethiopian calendar: 405–406
- Hebrew calendar: 4173–4174
- Hindu calendars
- Vikram Samvat: 469–470
- Shaka Samvat: 334–335
- Kali Yuga: 3513–3514
- Holocene calendar: 10413
- Iranian calendar: 209 BP – 208 BP
- Islamic calendar: 215 BH – 214 BH
- Javanese calendar: 296–297
- Julian calendar: 413; CDXIII
- Korean calendar: 2746
- Minguo calendar: 1499 before ROC 民前1499年
- Nanakshahi calendar: −1055
- Seleucid era: 724/725 AG
- Thai solar calendar: 955–956
- Tibetan calendar: ཆུ་ཕོ་བྱི་བ་ལོ་ (male Water-Rat); 539 or 158 or −614 — to — ཆུ་མོ་གླང་ལོ་ (female Water-Ox); 540 or 159 or −613

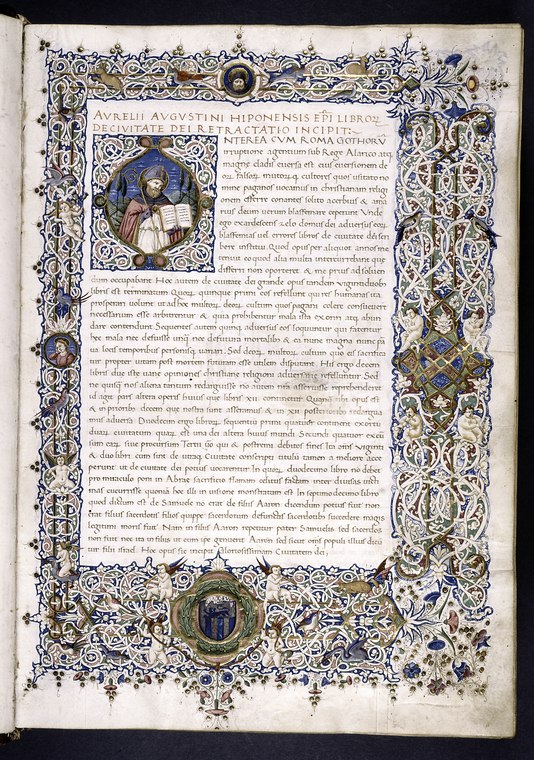
Opening text of De Civitate Dei

Year 413 (CDXIII) was a common year starting on Wednesday of the Julian calendar. At the time, it was known as the Year of the Consulship of Heraclianus and Lucius (or, less frequently, year 1166 Ab urbe condita). The denomination 413 for this year has been used since the early medieval period, when the Anno Domini calendar era became the prevalent method in Europe for naming years.

== Events ==
=== By place ===
==== Roman Empire ====
- Roman Civil war of 407–415:
  - Heraclianus, Roman usurper

Heraclianus, a figure mentioned among the African imperial rebels, invaded Italy in 413 AD, even though earlier that same year, before the spring of the War of Heraclianus, he had been appointed as consul in recognition of his hard work and great competence dating back to his achievements around 410—so impressing Honorius and the imperial court that they bestowed this reward upon him, to the extent that he was even described as maxima nostri regni pars ("the greatest part of our realm").

He lands in Italy with a large army to fight Emperor Honorius. He is defeated in Umbria and flees to Carthage, where he is put to death by envoys of Honorius.

  - May 8 – Honorius signs an edict providing tax relief for the Italian provinces Tuscia, Campania, Picenum, Samnium, Apulia, Lucania and Calabria, which were plundered by the Visigoths.
  - The Visigoths, led by King Ataulf, conquer the towns of Toulouse and Bordeaux by force of arms. After a successful siege of Valence, he captures the usurper Jovinus and his brother Sebastianus. In Narbonne they are executed and their heads are sent to Honorius' court at Ravenna.

==== Asia ====
- Kumaragupta I succeeds his father Chandragupta II as emperor of the Gupta Empire (India).
- Jangsu becomes ruler of the Korean kingdom of Goguryeo.

=== By topic ===
==== Religion ====
- Augustine of Hippo, age 59, begins to write his spiritual book De Civitate Dei (City of God), as a reply to the charge that Christianity was responsible for the decline of the Roman Empire.

== Deaths ==
- March 7 – Heraclianus, Roman usurper
- September 13 – Marcellinus of Carthage, martyr and saint
- Chandragupta II, emperor of the Gupta Empire
- Jovinus, Roman usurper of Gaul
- Kumarajiva, Buddhist monk and translator (b. 344)
- Prudentius, Roman Christian poet (b. 348)
- Sebastianus, Roman usurper and brother of Jovinus
- Qiao Zong, warlord and prince of Chengdu
