= Constans (consul 414) =

General of the Eastern Roman Empire

Constans (floruit 412–414) was a general of the Eastern Roman Empire.

== Biography ==
Constans was magister militum per Thracias in 412. In 414 he held the consulship (possibly while he still was magister militum) in Constantinople. His name may be a clue of a potential relationship to Constantius III, his Western colleague in the consulate and later Western emperor, but the sources do not mention any relationship between the two.

== Bibliography ==
- Martindale, John R., ed. (1980). "Constans 3". The Prosopography of the Later Roman Empire: Volume II, AD 395–527. Cambridge: Cambridge University Press. p. 311. ISBN 0-521-20159-4.

| Preceded by Heraclianus, Lucius | Roman consul 414 with Constantius | Succeeded by Honorius Augustus X, Theodosius Augustus VI |
