= Comes Africae =

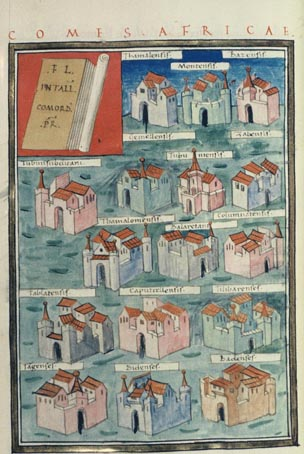
Cities under the responsibility of the comes Africae, of a manuscript of the Notitia dignitatum.

The comes Africae was in the Late Roman Empire, the commander of the troops comitatenses and limitanei in the diocese of Africa. His direct superiors were, in times of the Notitia dignitatum, about 400, the magister peditum for the units of infantry and the magister equitum for those of cavalry. He also supervised the performance of the dux limitis Mauretaniae Caesariensis and the dux provinciae Tripolitanae.

== Units under his control ==
He commanded twelve units (or detachments) of infantry and nineteen of cavalry, as indicated by the Notitia dignitatumː

- One of auxilia palatina (infantry): Celtae iuniores;
- Three legions palatinae (infantry): armigeri propugnatores seniores, armigeri propugnatores iuniores, Cimbriani;
- Eight legions comitatenses (infantry): secundani Italiciani, primani, secundani, tertiani, Constantiiani, Constantiaci, tertio Augustani, Fortenses;
- Nineteen 'vexillationes comitatensis' (cavalry): equites stablesiani Italiciani, equites scutarii seniores, equites stablesiani seniores, equites Marcomanni, equites sagittari clibanarii, equites sagittarii Parthi seniors, equites armigeri seniores, equites armigeri iuniores, equites cetrati seniores, equites primo sagittarii, equites secondo sagittarii, equites tertio sagittarii, equites quarto sagittarii, equites Parthi sagittarii iuniores, equites crinati iuniores, equites promoti iuniores, equites scutarii iuniores comitatenses, equites Honoriani iuniores, equites scutarii iuniores scholae secundi, equites armigeri iuniores;

To these units of Comitatenses were added another sixteen of limitaneiː

- Praepositus limitis Thamallensis', praepositus limitis Montensis in castris Leptitanis, praepositus limitis Bazensis', praepositus limitis Gemellensis, praepositus limitis Tubuniensis, praepositus limitis Zabensis', praepositus limitis Tubusubditani, praepositus limitis Thamallomensis', epositus limitis Balaretensis', praepositus limitis Columnatensis', praepositus limitis Tablatensis', praepositus limitis Caputcellensis, praepositus limitis Secundaeforum in castris Tillisibus', praepositus

== Comites Africae ==
- Gratian the Elder, beginning of the 320s.
- Caius Annius Tiberian 325-327.
- Roman 364-circa 373.
- Gildo 393-398.
- Gaudentius 399.
- Bathanarius 401-408.
- Juan? 408.
- Heraclian 408 (or 409, if in 408 John was in office)-412.
- Constant 409-410 (designated by the usurper Priscus Attalus).

== Bibliography ==
=== Primary sources ===
- Notitia Dignitatum, Occ., I, V, VII, XXI, XXV and XXX.

=== Modern historiographical sources ===
- J.Rodríguez González, History of the Roman Legions, Madrid, 2003.
- A.K.Goldsworthy, The Complete Roman Army, Thames and Hudson, London, 2003, ISBN 0-500-05124-0
- Y. Le Bohec, The Imperial Roman Army, Routledge, 2000, ISBN 9780415222952
