= Bathanarius =

Bathanarius (died 408) was a politician of the Western Roman Empire, comes Africae and brother-in-law of Stilicho.

== Life ==
Bathanarius married a sister of the powerful general Stilicho. He is attested as comes Africae since 401. In 408, when Stilicho was put to death by order of Emperor Honorius, Bathanarius was executed by imperial order and succeeded by Heraclianus.

Augustine of Hippo retells a story he had been told by bishop Severus of Milev, who had seen Bathanarius doing a trick with a magnet during a party.

== Sources ==
- Martindale, John R., ed. (1980). "Bathanarius". The Prosopography of the Later Roman Empire: Volume II, AD 395–527. Cambridge: Cambridge University Press. p. 221. ISBN 0-521-20159-4.
