= Lucius (consul 413) =

Flavius Lucius (floruit 408–413) was a politician of the Roman Empire.

In 408, he was comes sacrarum largitionum at the Eastern court. In 413, he was Roman consul together with Heraclianus, but his name is recorded only on Eastern inscriptions.

== Sources ==
- Martindale, John R., ed. (1980). "Fl. Lucius 3". The Prosopography of the Later Roman Empire: Volume II, AD 395–527. Cambridge: Cambridge University Press. p. 692. ISBN 0-521-20159-4.

Political offices
Preceded by Honorius Augustus IX; Theodosius Augustus V	Roman consul 413; With: Heraclianus	Succeeded by Constantius; Constans
