= Heraclianus =

Usurper of the Roman Empire from 412 to 413

- Usurper of the Western Roman Empire
- Reign: Summer 412–Spring 413
- Predecessor: Honorius
- Successor: Honorius
- Died: 7 March 413; Carthage

Heraclianus (Ancient Greek: Ἡρακλειανὸς, Herakleianòs; died 7 March 413) was a provincial governor and a usurper of the Western Roman Empire (412–413) opposed to Emperor Honorius, who had originally brought him to power. Heraclianus helped put down a rebellion by Priscus Attalus. However, he decided to stage his own rebellion and during his invasion of the Italian peninsula, was either defeated in battle or captured and executed.

== Biography ==
=== Opposition to Priscus Attalus ===
Europe and the Roman Empire in Heraclianus' time (AD 406)

The first known act of Heraclianus was the killing of the powerful Magister militum Stilicho (22 August 408) for Emperor Honorius, who wanted to remove his influential general. Honorius rewarded Heraclianus with the appointment to the rank of Comes Africae, Governor of the important province of Africa, in late 408.

According to Paulus Orosius, Heraclianus was sent to Africa in 409. Orosius also states that the Governor of Africa in 408 was "John", who was killed by the people of his province. However, in another account, Zosimus states that Heraclianus was the successor of Bathanarius, brother-in-law of Stilicho, put to death by Honorius.

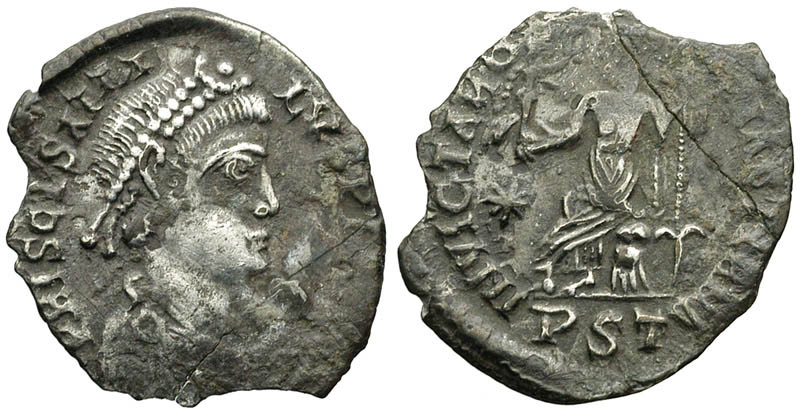
Coin minted by Priscus Attalus.

In 409, with the help of the Visigoths of King Alaric I, Priscus Attalus rebelled against Honorius, whose seat of power was in Ravenna, and set up his own court in Rome. Heraclianus remained loyal to Honorius and tightly controlled African ports to restrict the grain supply to the city of Rome and starve Rome out.

Attalus did not initially send an army to Africa against Heraclianus, as it would have to have been under Visigothic lead. Deceived by false prophecies or moved by his own jealousy of the Visigoths, he sent a lone representative, Constans, counting on his authority alone to depose Heraclianus or convince the provincials to rebel. However, Constans was killed, and Heraclianus sent Honorius the great sum he had confiscated from the envoys, intended to bribe the local population. Alaric wanted to send an army against Heraclianus under the command of his own man Drumas. But Attalus opposed this, and Alaric deposed him in 410. As Alaric intended to send a rather small army of only 500 men, it is probable that Heraclianus had only a very small force at his own disposal. However, it is also probable that Heraclianus had the support of the local population, as Emperor Honorius had recently issued a tolerance edict in favour of the Donatists, a Christian sect very popular in Africa. According to the historian Adrian Goldsworthy, Attalus sent a Roman commander with regular troops to secure the province of Africa, but these were seriously defeated by the Roman troops of Heraclianus, who for the time being remained loyal to the Emperor Honorius.

=== Usurpation against Honorius ===
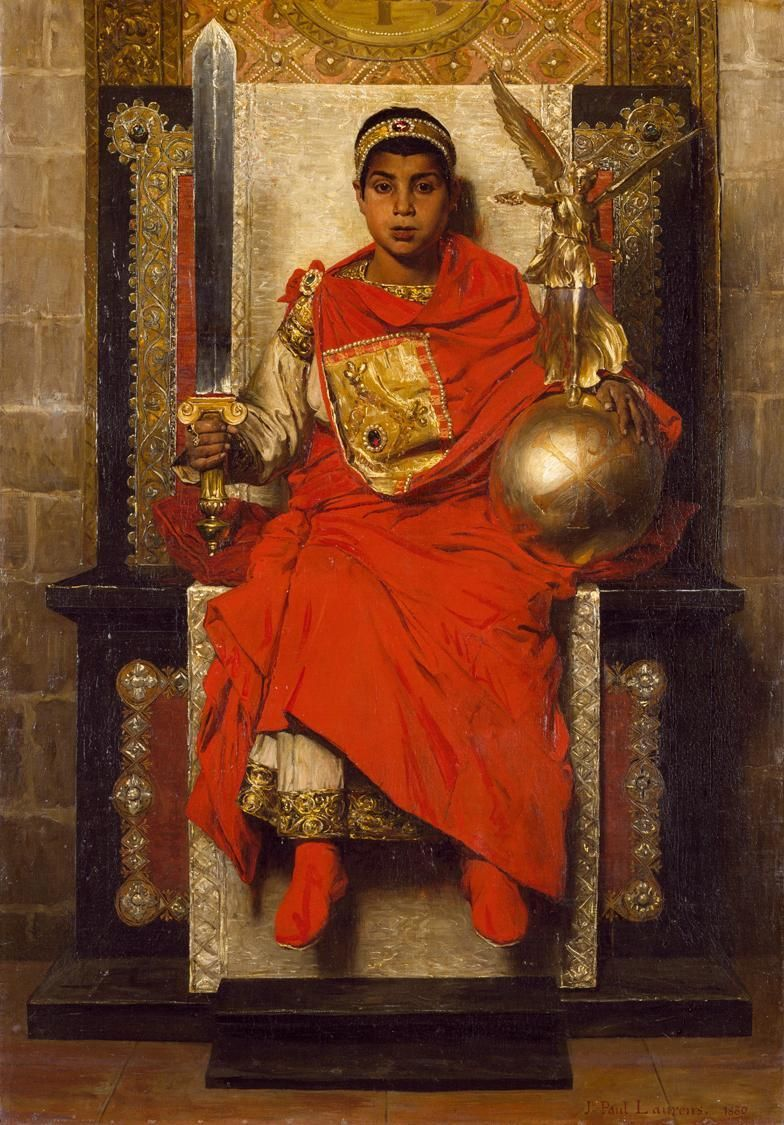
The Byzantine Emperor Honorius, Jean-Paul Laurens, 1880.

In 412 Heraclianus was designated for the consulate of the year 413, but in all probability he was never appointed Consul. Confident in his own power and instigated by Sabinus, his son-in-law, he rebelled against Honorius and proclaimed himself Augustus. His first act was to interrupt the grain supply to the city of Rome, as he had successfully done against Priscus Attalus. Next he gathered several ships along with troops to invade Italy. Honorius had Heraclianus and his supporters proclaimed enemies of the State and condemned to death with an edict issued in Ravenna on 7 July 412.

In 413, Heraclianus arrived in Italy with a large army to fight Honorius. With regards to his death, there are two versions: According to Orosius and Marcellinus Comes, Heraclianus arrived in Italy and moved towards Rome, but he was frightened by the arrival of Comes Marinus. He left his army and fled to Carthage, where he was put to death on 7 March. The second version, as put forth by Hydatius, sees Heraclianus defeated at Utriculum (maybe Oriculum, in Umbria, halfway between Rome and Ravenna), in a battle with 50,000 deaths, then fleeing to Carthage, where he was put to death by envoys sent by Honorius in the temple of Memoria. Sabinus, Heraclianus' son-in-law, fled to the eastern court at Constantinople but was later sent back and then exiled.

Heraclianus' name does not appear in the Fasti consulares, the list of all Roman consuls, as Honorius probably revoked his appointment and left Lucius as Consul without colleague. Heraclianus' acts were revoked; his possessions, 2,000 lb of gold and land of the same value, were confiscated and given to Flavius Constantius.

Jerome accused Heraclianus of mistreating those who had fled from Rome to Carthage on the occasion of Attalus' usurpation (Heraclianus imprisoned the noblewomen Anicia Faltonia Proba, Anicia Iuliana and Demetrias, and freed them only after a huge payment), and of being a drunken and corrupt man.

== Bibliography ==
=== Primary sources ===
- Jerome, Epistulae, 130.7; Dialogus contra Pelagianos, 3.19; Commentaria in Ezechielem, 9.28
- Jordanes, Romana, 325
- Hydatius, Chronicon, 51,56
- Marcellinus Comes, Chronicon, sub anno 413
- Olympiodorus of Thebes, frammento 23
- Orosius, Historiae adversum Paganos, 7.29,42
- Procopius of Caesarea, Guerra vandalica, 1.2.30.36
- Prosper of Aquitaine, sub anno 413
- Sozomen, 9.8.3–7
- Theophanes the Confessor, AM 5904
- Zosimus, Historia Nova, 5.37; 6.7–11
- Chronica Gallica of 452, 75

=== Secondary sources ===
- Martindale, John R., ed. (1992). The Prosopography of the Later Roman Empire: Volume III, AD 527–641. Cambridge: Cambridge University Press. ISBN 0-521-20160-8.
- Bury, J. B., A History of the Later Roman Empire from Arcadius to Irene, Vol. I (1889)
- Smith, William, Dictionary of Greek and Roman Biography and Mythology, Volume 2, C. Little and J. Brown, Boston, 1870, p. 402

Preceded by Honorius Augustus IX; Theodosius Augustus V	Roman consul 413; With: Lucius	Succeeded by Constantius; Constans
