= Constantius III =

Roman emperor in 421

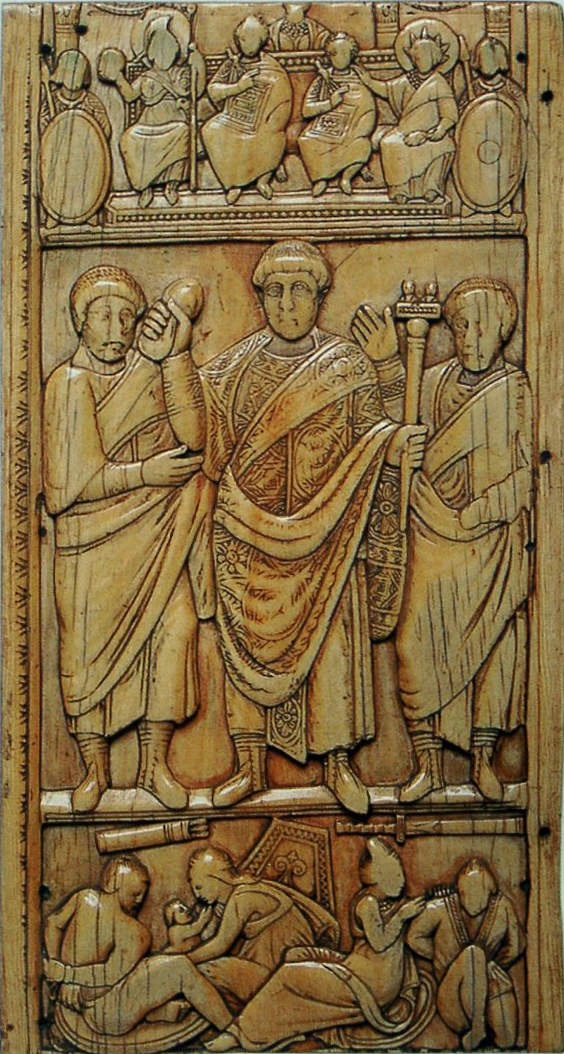
- Consular diptych of Constantius III

Roman emperor in the West
- Reign: 8 February – 2 September 421 (with Honorius)
- Born: Constantius; Naissus, Moesia
- Died: 2 September 421; Ravenna, Italia
- Spouse: Galla Placidia
- Issue: Justa Grata Honoria; Valentinian III
Regnal name
- Imperator Caesar Flavius Constantius Augustus
- Dynasty: Theodosian and Valentinian

Constantius III (died 2 September 421) was briefly Roman emperor in the West in 421, having earned the throne through his capability as a general under Honorius. By 411 he had achieved the rank of magister militum, and in the same year he suppressed the revolt of the usurper Constantine III. Constantius went on to lead campaigns against various barbarian groups in Hispania and Gaul, recovering much of both for the Western Roman Empire. He married Honorius's sister Galla Placidia in 417, a sign of his ascendant status, and was proclaimed co-emperor by Honorius on 8 February 421. Constantius reigned for seven months before dying on 2 September 421.

== Life ==
=== Early life ===
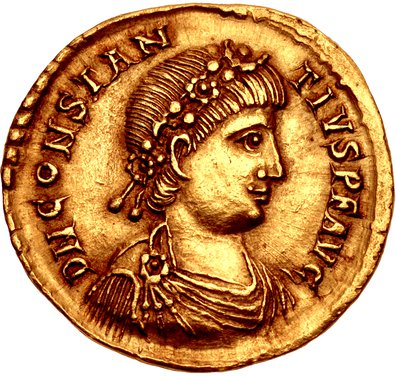
Solidus of Constantius III

Constantius was born in Naissus, Moesia, (present-day Niš, Serbia) of Illyrian origin. The contemporary historian Olympiodorus of Thebes describes him as "a man with large eyes, long neck, and broad head", sullen and aloof in public but capable of "pleasant and witty" conduct at parties. Constantius served as a general under Honorius, rising to the rank of Magister militum (Master of the Soldiers) by 411.

=== Revolt of Constantine III ===
In 411 Constantius was sent by Honorius to put down the revolt of Constantine III, who had declared himself emperor in Britain in 407. Constantius thereafter led his soldiers to Arles, the capital and residence of Constantine. Upon arriving, he defeated the army of Gerontius, a general who was rebelling against Constantine, before besieging the city.

Constantine refused to surrender, hoping to last until the return of his general Edobichus, who was raising troops in northern Gaul. When Edobichus did return to Arles, he was swiftly defeated by Constantius. Constantine soon after lost much of the remainder of his forces, as his army which had been guarding the Rhine chose to support the usurper Jovinus instead, forcing Constantine to surrender. Despite Constantius's assurances that Constantine would be able to safely retire to a clerical office, Constantius had him imprisoned, and further had him beheaded during his return to Ravenna, in either August or September 411. Honorius's remaining rivals were soon defeated, with Gerontius committing suicide in Hispania, and Jovinus being defeated by Athaulf, king of the Visigoths. Despite this, Honorius was unable to regain control of Britain, nor was any Roman after him.

=== The war against Heraclianus ===
The appointment of Constantius as commander-in-chief led to a war in 412 with the rival general Heraclianus, governor of Africa who, like Constantius, had done good services for Emperor Honorius. Having first revolted and stopped grain supplies to Italy, Heraclianus landed an invasion army near Rome at the beginning of March 413. Constantius defeated the rebels in a battle at Utriculum, and Heraclianus fled. He was later captured and murdered.

=== Campaigns ===
Constantius initiated a campaign against the Visigoths in northern Hispania in 416, blockading them in order to starve them and force their submission. Soon after, the Visigoth king, Wallia, surrendered to Rome; in exchange for food supplies, he agreed to return Galla Placidia (the half sister of Honorius, who had been captured by Alaric c. 410, and been forced into marriage with Athaulf, who was by this time dead), and to wage war against the Vandals and other barbarians who the Romans were still in conflict with. This development enabled Constantius to put an end to the Bagaudae revolt in northwestern Gaul in 417. He then continued his campaign against various tribal groups and regained control of much of Hispania and Gaul by 420.

=== Emperor ===
During this time period, generals played a critical role in ensuring the continued reign of Roman Emperors, especially Western Roman Emperors. Constantius's position of magister militum and his skill as a commander allowed him to gain huge influence over the Western Roman Empire, comparable to the earlier Stilicho. For this reason, Honorius bestowed many honors upon Constantius, such as appointing him consul three times: in 414, alongside Constans; in 417, alongside Honorius; and in 420, alongside Theodosius II. In order to further ensure Constantius's loyalty, Honorius arranged the betrothal of his half sister, Galla Placidia, to Constantius in 417. Later, on 8 February 421, Honorius made Constantius co-Western Emperor under himself. Theodosius II refused to recognize the appointment, angering Constantius and making him contemplate an attack on the Eastern empire.

=== Death ===
Constantius's health deteriorated rapidly and he died, after less than 7 months as emperor, on 2 September 421. Referencing the proposed punitive attack, Michael Grant says that "[had Constantius] lived, he might have postponed the downfall of the West— but only at the cost of damaging his Eastern partners". His widow Galla Placidia fled with her children to Constantinople. Honorius died in 423 and was succeeded by Valentinian III, the minor son of Constantius, with Placidia as regent.

== See also ==
- Roman Civil war of 407–415

Political offices
Preceded by Heraclianus; Lucius	Roman consul 414; With: Constans	Succeeded by Honorius; Theodosius II
Preceded by Theodosius II; Junius Quartus Palladius	Roman consul II; 417; With: Honorius	Succeeded by Honorius; Theodosius II
Preceded by Monaxius; Plinta	Roman consul III; 420; With: Theodosius II	Succeeded by Agricola; Eustathius
Military offices
Preceded by Stilicho; In 408	Magister militum of the Western Roman Army; 411–421	Succeeded by Castinus; In 422
