= 406 =

406 in various calendars
Gregorian calendar	406; CDVI
Ab urbe condita	1159
Assyrian calendar	5156
Balinese saka calendar	327–328
Bengali calendar	−188 – −187
Berber calendar	1356
Buddhist calendar	950
Burmese calendar	−232
Byzantine calendar	5914–5915
Chinese calendar	乙巳年 (Wood Snake); 3103 or 2896 — to — 丙午年 (Fire Horse); 3104 or 2897
Coptic calendar	122–123
Discordian calendar	1572
Ethiopian calendar	398–399
Hebrew calendar	4166–4167
- Hindu calendars
Vikram Samvat	462–463
Shaka Samvat	327–328
Kali Yuga	3506–3507
Holocene calendar	10406
Iranian calendar	216 BP – 215 BP
Islamic calendar	223 BH – 222 BH
Javanese calendar	289–290
Julian calendar	406; CDVI
Korean calendar	2739
Minguo calendar	1506 before ROC 民前1506年
Nanakshahi calendar	−1062
Seleucid era	717/718 AG
Thai solar calendar	948–949
Tibetan calendar	ཤིང་མོ་སྦྲུལ་ལོ་ (female Wood-Snake); 532 or 151 or −621 — to — མེ་ཕོ་རྟ་ལོ་ (male Fire-Horse); 533 or 152 or −620

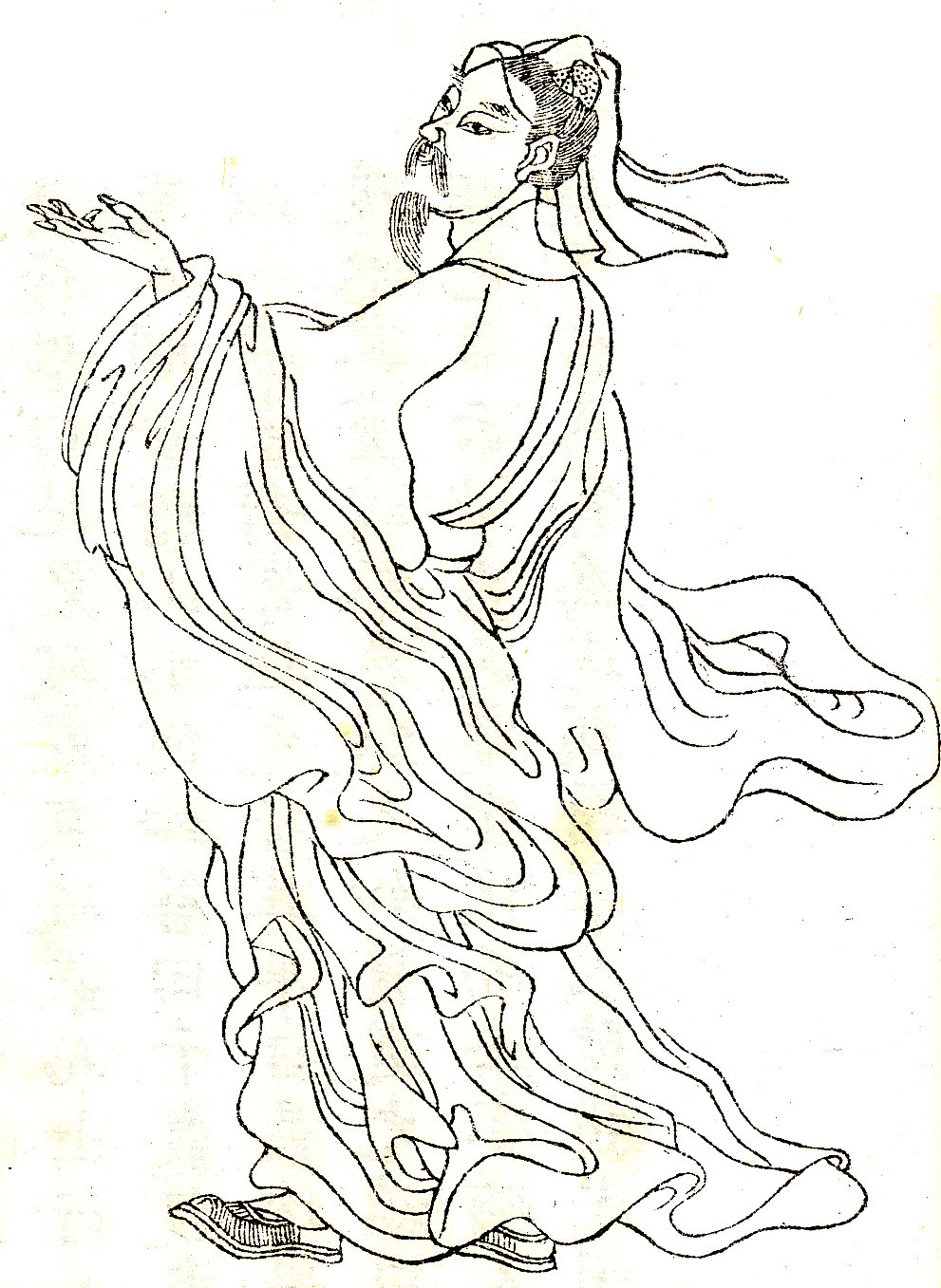
Gu Kaizhi

Year 406 (CDVI) was a common year starting on Monday of the Julian calendar. In the Roman Empire, it was known as the Year of the Consulship of Arcadius and Probus (or, less frequently, year 1159 Ab urbe condita). The denomination 406 for this year has been used since the early medieval period, when the Anno Domini calendar era became the prevalent method in Europe for naming years.

== Events ==
=== By place ===
==== Roman Empire ====
- Radagaisus is forced to retreat into the hills of Fiesole. There he tries to escape, but is captured by the Romans.

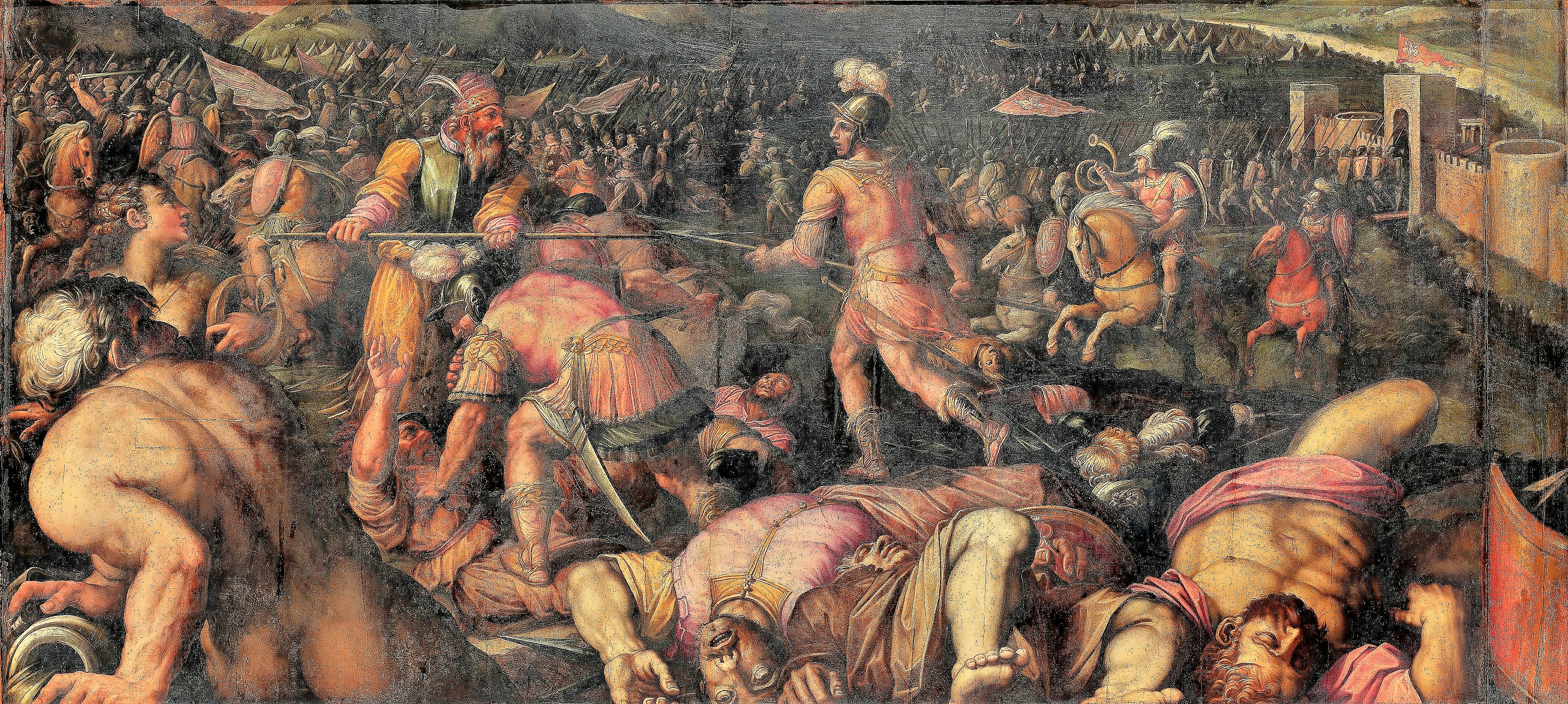
Defeat of Radagaisus at Fiesole

- August 23 – Radagaisus is executed; 12,000 "barbarians" are incorporated into the Roman army, or sold as slaves.
- Autumn – The remaining Roman legions in Britain decide to mutiny. The usurper Marcus is proclaimed emperor.
- Vandal-Frankish war: The Vandals, led by Godigisel, are intercepted and defeated by the Franks under Marcomir. Godigisel is killed in battle and succeeded by his son Gunderic.
- December 31 – Vandals, Alans and Suebians cross the Rhine at Mogontiacum (modern Mainz), beginning an invasion of Gaul (traditional date, this may have occurred in 405).

==== Asia ====
- Faxian, Chinese traveler, arrives in India. He visits the major seats of Buddhist learning (Udyana, Peshawar, and Taxila).
- Hanzei succeeds his brother Richu, and becomes the 18th emperor of Japan in the traditional order of succession.

=== By topic ===
==== Agriculture ====
- Cultivation of rye, oats, hops, and spelt (a wheat used for livestock feed) is introduced in Europe by the native Vandals, Alans, and Sciri, who also introduce a heavy wheeled plow to be used for farming.

==== Religion ====
- Stained glass is used for the first time in churches in Rome.

== Births ==
- Attila the Hun, ruler of the Hunnic Empire (approximate date) (d. 453)
- Lu Xiujing
- Shao Di, emperor of the Liu Song dynasty (d. 424)

== Deaths ==
- August 23 – Radagaisus, Gothic king
- Alban of Mainz, priest and martyr (approximate date)
- Godigisel, king of the Vandals
- Gu Kaizhi, Chinese painter (b. c. 344)
- Zhang Tianxi, ruler of Former Liang (b. 346)
