= Hasdingi =

Vandal clan in the Roman era

The Hasdingi, Asdingi or Hastingi were a group categorized as Vandals during the Roman era. The name referred to both a specific ruling dynasty or clan, and also sometimes to the population they led.

The first Hasdingi are known from Graeco-Roman sources for leading a series of migrations. They were first mentioned when they led the Vandal settlement of former-Roman Dacia in the late second century, during the Marcomannic Wars.

After living on both sides of the border of the Roman Empire for more than 200 years, they left together with many other peoples of the Middle Danube during a period of instability. Hasdingi and Silingi Vandals, along with Alans, crossed the Rhine in 406, fighting their way into Roman Gaul, which was also in a state of upheaval.

After plundering what is now France, in 409 the Vandals and Alans entered Roman Hispania, where short-lived kingdoms were created by the Silingi, Alans and Hasdingi. Central Roman authority reasserted itself in 411, and after major defeats in 418 the remaining forces accepted Hasdingi leadership.

In 429 the Hasdingi led a large combined force to North Africa, where they began the process of creating the Vandal Kingdom, which ruled Roman North Africa and had its capital at Carthage in what is now Tunisia. While it existed, the royal dynasty of this kingdom continued to be referred to as Hasdingi. The Hasdingi, like the Vandals generally, ceased being mentioned after 534 when their kingdom was destroyed by the Byzantine empire.

== Relationship to Vandals ==
The Hasdings were sometimes simply referred to as the Vandals, while at other times they represent a part of the Vandals. The exact relationship between the terms Hasdingi and Vandali during classical times, and how it evolved, is not entirely clear. The 6th century writer Jordanes referred to Visimar as king of the Vandal "people" (genus) who ruled territory centred in Dacia in the 4th century during the reign of Constantine the Great. He also described him as being "of the stock of the Asdings" (Asdingorum stirpe). In this context Jordanes cited the third century writer Dexippus, whose work is mainly lost, as a source for the information that among the Vandals the Asdings were seen as a very warlike people (genus). According to Jordanes, Dexippus noted that in his time the Vandals held a very extensive territory stretching to the "Ocean". The Roman senator Cassiodorus, who was an older near-contemporary of Jordanes and one of his main sources, also referred to the Hasdings as a stock or bloodline in a diplomatic letter to the Vandal kingdom in Carthage. This is one of the only classical records which includes an "h" in the spelling, and it states that the royal family of that kingdom was of the hasdingorum stirpem.

Before the Marcomanni Wars in the late second century AD, there are no mentions of the Hasdingi, and in the 1st century AD, Roman authors Pliny the Elder and Tacitus mentioned the Vandals only as a category of Germanic peoples (Latin: Germani). Within this Vandal category Pliny mentioned the Burgundiones, Varini, Carini (otherwise unknown) and Gutones. Based on the geographical descriptions of Tacitus and Ptolemy, scholars believe that the Varini lived in what is now northern Germany, while the Gutones and Burgundiones lived near the lower Vistula in what is now Poland. All three peoples therefore lived near the southern coast of the Baltic Sea. Scholars believe that the Vandal peoples spoke an East Germanic language related to the Gothic language. The Goths first appear in written records in the region of present-day Romania, Moldova, and Ukraine, in the 3rd century, and probably had a connection to the first-century Gutones who had been described by Pliny as Vandalic. In the 6th century, Procopius stated that the Vandals, Goths and Gepids of his time were all "Gothic peoples" (or literally "Getic" peoples) and spoke the same language.

== Name ==
The name of the Hasdingi is believed to be Germanic, and it is believed to refer to a people who wore long hair.

There is no contemporary description of their hair but the original form of the root word is reconstructed by scholars as Germanic *hazdaz, related to Old Norse haddr, which refers to women's hair.

The -ing ending is well-known in Germanic languages as a suffix referring to groups united by a sense of belonging, for example because of a common descent.

== Before Adrianople ==
According to Dio Cassius, during the Marcomannic Wars in the late 2nd century, the Hasdingi and Lacringi helped the Romans in their wars against the Marcomanni, Quadi, Iazyges, and their allies, and were able to settle in lands closer to the Roman empire. Led by their chiefs Raüs and Raptus, the "Astingi" (Αστιγγοι) "entered Dacia with their entire households, hoping to secure both money and land in return for their alliance". When this did not work they conquered the land of the Costoboci, near Dacia, but then proceeded to cause problems in Roman Dacia again. The Lacringi feared that the Roman governor of Dacia might let them into land which they were inhabiting. They therefore attacked the Hasdingi and won a decisive victory. "As a result, the Astingi committed no further acts of hostility against the Romans, but in response to urgent supplications addressed to Marcus Aurelius they received from him both money and the privilege of asking for land in case they should inflict some injury upon those who were then fighting against him." Dio Cassius emphasizes that the Hasdingi really did fulfil such promises.

The Crisis of the Third Century was a period of weakness and chaos in the Roman Empire, and saw the rise of the Goths as a new power in Eastern Europe. Jordanes, writing centuries later in his Getica, reported that the "Astringi" were among the many allies of the Gothic king Ostrogotha when he attacked the Roman empire during the reign of Philip the Arab (reigned 244-248). Jordanes referred more generally to Ostrogotha as a ruler who lorded it over the previously powerful Vandals, Marcomanni and Quadi, and even demanded tribute from the Roman Empire.

A fragment from the 3rd century history of Dexippus mentions that the emperor Aurelian (reigned 270-275) defeated a large group of Vandals on the Danube frontier, and their kings and rulers came to an agreement with him to supply 2000 horsemen to the Romans. Modern scholars date this to the spring of 271 and believe that these Vandals were most likely the Hasdingi who Jordanes reported to be living in Dacia at this time, near the Roman frontier on the Danube. According to Jordanes, in one of his texts Dexippus described the Vandals as holding a very large territory stretching to the "Ocean", and supposedly referred to the Hasdingi as being both the stirps (bloodline or stock) and a genus (people) who the Vandals saw as very warlike.

Claudius Mamertinus, in Latin panegyric number "11", praising the emperor Maximian (reigned 286-305), says of some year shortly after 291 that the Tervingi, a "part of the Goths", "together with the Taifals, campaigned against the Vandals and Gepids" (Latin: Tervingi, pars alia Gothorum, adiuncta manu Taifalorum, adversum Vandalos Gipedesque concurrunt). All of these peoples are associated with Dacia after this time.

During the reign of Constantine the Great (reigned 306-337), Jordanes also reported that the Vandals, under the leadership of an Hasdingi king named Visimar, were holding the former Roman province of Dacia, which was no longer under Roman control. However they were defeated by the Goths under King Geberic and those who were not warriors requested to be allowed to settle across the Danube in Roman Pannonia, where they remained as legal residents for 60 years — indicating a period until about 395, which is the death year of emperor Theodosius I. After this they became mobile and invaded Gaul. According to Eutropius, writing around 360, the Taifali, Victohali, and Tervingi were in possession of Dacia. Jordanes noted that in his time the territory once inhabited by these Hasdingi was ruled by the Gepids.

== After Adrianople ==
In 378 the Romans suffered a major defeat at the Battle of Adrianople, which was caused by a sudden movement of peoples including Goths, Alans and Huns coming from present-day Ukraine to the east. The emperor Valens died in the defeat. According to Ammianus, the Pannonian region was among the areas first affected by "a savage horde of unknown peoples, driven from their abodes by sudden violence".

By 380, one of the armed groups responsible for the defeat, led by Alatheus and Saphrax who were wards of the underage king of the Greuthungi Goths, entered the Pannonian part of the Roman empire with the permission of emperor Gratian, while his new co-emperor Theodosius was out of action with a serious illness. Also in about 380, Jordanes mentions that the Vandals, perhaps those in Pannonia, made an invasion which caused the surviving emperor Gratian to move into Gaul. It is possible that the Vandals invaded Gaul itself already during this period.

After the death of emperor Theodosius I in 395, Saint Jerome listed the Vandals and their long-time neighbours the Quadi and Marcomanni, together with several of the new eastern peoples who were causing devastation in the Roman provinces stretching from Constantinople to the Julian Alps, including Dalmatia, and all the provinces of Pannonia: "Goths and Sarmatians, Quadi and Alans, Huns and Vandals and Marcomanni". The poet Claudian described them crossing the frozen Danube with wagons, and then setting wagons rigged around themselves like a wall at the approach of the Roman commander Stilicho. He says that all the fertile lands between the Black Sea and Adriatic were subsequently like uninhabited deserts, specifically including Dalmatia and Pannonia. At the same time, the Gothic general Alaric I, who had loyally served with his Gothic troops under Theodosius I at the Battle of Frigidus only a few months early, was beginning his rebellion, and started leading his army south, first towards Constantinople, and later towards Greece. This was triggered by internal Roman conflicts after the death of Theodosius. While some later writers blamed Stilicho, Claudian claimed that they were all incited by an Eastern Roman consul and enemy of Stilicho, Rufinus. The exact connection between Alaric and those peoples Claudian mentioned crossing the Danube remains unclear.

In 401, Claudian described how Raetia was troubled by the local Vindelici while Stilicho was preoccupied in Italy with the invasion of Alaric, the Gothic military leader from inside the empire. According to Claudian, non-Roman peoples (gentes) broke their treaties (foedera) and, encouraged by the news of trouble in Italy, they seized parts of Roman Vindelicia (in Raetia) and Noricum. The text says that Stilicho's victorious forces earned "Vandal spoils" (Vandalicis ... spoliis), and so assuming he was not referring to the local Vindelici, many scholars believe Vandals were involved. Furthermore, there are proposals that they included the same Vandal groups who later went to Hispania, including both Silingi and Hasdingi Vandals. Some scholars have interpreted this to mean that some Vandals (perhaps Silingi) had already moved westwards up the Danube, and closer the Rhine.

In 406, the year of the Rhine crossing of the Vandals and Alans, Radagaisus, a Gothic leader from outside the empire, attacked Italy with a very large force which was apparently assembled near the Pannonian area. By August he was defeated. Modern scholars have proposed various connections between these events and the movement subsequent westwards of the Vandals and others from the regions near Pannonia into Gaul. In any case, at the end of 406, the Hasdingi Vandals participated together with Silingi Vandals and Sarmatian Alans in an historic crossing of the Rhine, entering Roman Gaul. The king of the Hasdingi, Godigisel, lost his life in battle against the Franks, who attempted to block the crossing into Gaul. Gregory of Tours cited a text of Frigeridus, which claimed that 20,000 front-line Vandal troops fell, and the Alans led by King Respendial retreated at first, but then saved the Vandal nation from being destroyed, by coming to their rescue. Another Alan King, Goar, joined the Romans, and was subsequently settled in Gaul.

According to the version of Jordanes, the Hasdingi were summoned to invade Gaul by the Roman military leader Stilicho, who was reputed to have Vandal origins, and once there they became a mobile group who plundered Roman Gaul. Another 6th-century writer, Procopius believed that they were forced by hunger to travel west and cross the Rhine. However, he wrongly believed that the Vandals had previously been living much further east near the Sea of Azov, like their allies who entered Gaul with them, the Alans.

In another letter by Saint Jerome from 409, many of the peoples of the Pannonian region, including even Pannonians from within the Roman empire itself, were confirmed as invaders occupying Roman Gaul at that time: "Quadi, Vandals, Sarmatians, Alans, Gepids, Herules, Saxons, Burgundians, Allemanni and—alas! for the commonweal!—even Pannonians". Of these only the Saxons, Burgundians and Alemanni were not from the Middle Danube, but they were long term neighbours of Gaul.

== Spain and Africa ==
In 409, the same year as Jerome's letter, the Vandals moved from Gaul into Roman Hispania — the Iberian Peninsula. In 411, the rebel Roman military leader of Hispania, Gerontius agreed to allocate large parts of Hispania to several barbarian peoples who entered from Gaul. The Hasdingi settled in eastern Gallaecia, the Suebi settled to their west on the ocean coast of Gaellicia, the Silingi settled in the south in Baetica, and the Alans settled in a large area including Lusitania and Carthaginiensis. These can be seen as some of the earliest Barbarian kingdoms to be founded before the fall of the Western Roman Empire, although they probably began as normal Roman military billeting arrangements.

In 411, after granting these kingdoms, Gerontius was attacked by Roman forces, lost power in Hispania, and committed suicide. In 416, Alaric I's Gothic people were given their own kingdom in Aquitania in southwestern Gaul, by agreement with the central Roman government. In 417 or 418, as allies of Rome they entered Hispania, destroyed the Silingi kingdom, and killed the king of the Alans.

Survivors of the Silingi and Alans appear to have accepted Hasdingi leadership after their defeats, and the brothers Gunderic and Geiseric, Godegisel's successors as rulers of the Hasdingi, attacked the Suevian kingdom. In 419-420 the Roman military leader in Hispania Asterius (comes Hispaniarum) brought relief to the Suevi and defeated the Vandals in battle. The Vandals, as the merged group is normally called, fled to Baetica in southern Iberia. In 422 the Vandals narrowly defeated the Roman general Flavius Castinus, apparently because some of his Gothic troops deserted.

Gunderic was killed in battle and succeeded by his brother Gaiseric in 428 AD, who, according to Procopius, was a co-ruler up until then. These Vandals subsequently acquired boats and moved from Iberia to North Africa where they eventually established the Vandal Kingdom at Carthage. The newly merged people of this kingdom are not normally referred to as Hasdingi. One exceptional case was when Cassiodorus, in a diplomatic letter, used the term to refer to the royal family of the African Vandal Kingdom.

== Bibliography ==
- Castritius, Helmut (2005), "Sweben", in Beck, Heinrich; Geuenich, Dieter; Steuer, Heiko (eds.), Reallexikon der Germanischen Altertumskunde, vol. 30 (2 ed.), De Gruyter, ISBN 978-3-11-018385-6
- Castritius, Helmut (2006), "Wandalen", in Beck, Heinrich; Geuenich, Dieter; Steuer, Heiko (eds.), Reallexikon der Germanischen Altertumskunde, vol. 33 (2 ed.), De Gruyter, pp. 168–209, ISBN 978-3-11-018388-7
- Goffart, Walter (2006), Barbarian Tides: The Migration Age and the Later Roman Empire, University of Pennsylvania Press, ISBN 0-8122-3939-3
- Halsall, Guy (2007). Barbarian Migration and the Roman West, 376-568. Cambridge University Press. doi:10.1017/CBO9780511802393. ISBN 978-0-521-43491-1.
- Heather, Peter (1995), "The Huns and the End of the Roman Empire in Western Europe", The English Historical Review, 110 (435): 4–41, doi:10.1093/ehr/CX.435.4, JSTOR 573374
- Heather, Peter (2009), Empires and Barbarians. The Fall of Rome and the Birth of Europe, Oxford University Press, ISBN 9780199735600
- Liebeschuetz, Wolf (2003), "Gens into Regnum: The Vandals", Regna and Gentes. The Relationship between Late Antique and Early Medieval Peoples and Kingdoms in the Transformation of the Roman World, Transformation of the Roman World, vol. 13, Brill, pp. 55–83, doi:10.1163/9789047404255_007, ISBN 9789047404255
- Meier, Mischa (2010), "Alarich I.", Germanische Altertumskunde Online, De Gruyter
- Nixon, C E V; Rodgers, Barbara Saylor (1994). In praise of later Roman emperors: the Panegyrici Latini. Berkeley: University of California Press. ISBN 0-520-08326-1.
- Reichert, Hermann; Castritius, Helmut (1999), "Hasdingen", in Beck, Heinrich; Geuenich, Dieter; Steuer, Heiko (eds.), Reallexikon der Germanischen Altertumskunde, vol. 14 (2 ed.), De Gruyter, pp. 26–28, ISBN 978-3-11-016423-7
- Reynolds, Robert (1957), "Reconsideration of the History of the Suevi", Revue belge de Philologie et d'Histoire, 35 (1): 19–47, doi:10.3406/rbph.1957.2022
- Schönfeld (1911), "Hasdingi", Wörterbuch der altgermanischen personen- und völkernamen, p. 129
- Tausend, Klaus (1999), "Bemerkungen zum Wandaleneinfall des Jahres 271", Historia: Zeitschrift für Alte Geschichte, 48: 119–127, JSTOR 4436534

== See also ==
- Haddingjar, who appear to be late reflections of the Hasdingi in Norse mythology.
- Migrations period
- The western Alans and Vandals
- Timeline of Germanic kingdoms
- Hydatii Episcopi Chronicon (in Latin)
