= Goar =

King of the Alans (b. before 390 – d. between 446 and 450)

- King of the Alans
- Reign: before 406 – late 440s
- Successor: Sangiban

Goar (born before 390, died between 446 and 450) was a leader of the Alans in 5th-century Gaul. Around the time that the Vandals and other Alans under Respendial crossed the Rhine in 405 or 406, Goar's band of Alans quickly joined the Romans, and subsequently played a role in the internal politics of Gaul.

== Biography ==
=== Joining the Romans ===
Goar is first mentioned as 'Goare' in the Frigeridus fragment, (Note: "Renatus Profuturus Frigeridus, whom we have already mentioned, in his story of the capture and destruction of Rome by the Goths, says: "Meantime when Goare had gone over to the Romans, Respendial, king of the Alamanni, turned the army of his people from the Rhine, since the Vandals were getting the worse of the war with the Franks, having lost their king Godegisil, and about 20,000 of the army, and all the Vandals would have been exterminated if the army of the Alamanni [note: Alamanni for Alani] had not come to their aid in time." It is surprising to us that when he [=Frigeridus] names the kings of the other nations he does not name the king of the Franks as well." – Gregory of Tours quoting Frigeridus (the Frigeridus fragment) in History of the Franks (Book II, Chapter 9).) embedded in Gregory of Tours's work, describing the Vandal–Frankish war that preceded the Crossing of the Rhine (the crossing was dated to 31 December 406 by Prosper of Aquitaine). According to Frigeridus, the Roman-allied Franks were inflicting heavy casualties on the Vandals over the course of probably several battles, killing 20,000 Vandal warriors and their king Godigisel, and were on the verge of exterminating the tribe. At that point – according to MacDowall (2016) probably in the summer or autumn of 406 – another Alan king, Respendial, came to the Vandals' rescue and defeated the Franks, "although Goar had gone over to the Romans." It's unclear from Frigeridus' account whether Goar actually joined the Franks in fighting against the Vandals and Respendial's Alans; but in any case, other sources make clear that Goar's Alans were eventually settled in Gaul near Orléans by the Romans, while the Vandals, Suevi, and Respendial's Alans continued into Spain. According to bishop Hydatius' chronicle, the Vandals were the first to arrive in Spain in September or October 409, while Gregory notes that Suebi and Alans (presumably those led by Respendial) followed them later. It is not stated where these groups originated, although most historians identify these Alans with those settled by Gratian in Pannonia c. 380.

=== Usurpation of Jovinus ===
Goar next appears in 411, when he and Gundahar, king of the Burgundians, joined in setting up the Gallo-Roman senator Jovinus as Roman Emperor at Mainz (as described by Olympiodorus of Thebes). At the time, another usurping emperor, Constantine III, was being besieged at Arles by Honorius' general, the future emperor Constantius III. Constantine's supporters in northern Gaul defected to Jovinus, contributing to Constantine's defeat. Jovinus then threatened Constantius with "Burgundians, Alamanni, Franks, Alans, and all his army" (presumably including Goar). Jovinus' usurpation was put down two years later, however, when the Visigoths entered Gaul after their sack of Rome the previous year. The Visigothic king Athaulf, after a period of indecision, sided with the government of Honorius in Ravenna and defeated Jovinus at Valentia. The Alan and Burgundian response to this defeat is not recorded.

=== Siege of Bazas ===
After defeating Jovinus, the Visigoths came into renewed conflict with Honorius; this conflict culminated with the siege of Bazas in 414. According to Paulinus of Pella, who was among the besieged at the time, the Visigoths were supported by a group of Alans (whose king he describes, but does not name). Paulinus, who had previously established a friendship with the Alan king, persuaded him to break with the Goths and side with the Roman defenders of the city. The Alan leader did so, turning over his wife and son to the Romans as hostages. The Visigoths thereupon withdrew from Bazas and retreated to Spain, while the Alans were settled as Roman allies.

Historians are divided as to whether Paulinus' unnamed Alan king should be identified with Goar, or with some other Alan leader—otherwise unknown—who might have been accompanying the Visigoths since Italy or before. The former identification would imply that Goar had allied himself with Athaulf after the Goths' defeat of Jovinus; the latter hypothesis would imply that from this time on there was a second, distinct group of Alans in Gaul, in addition to those of Goar.

=== Bishop Germanus of Auxerre ===
In his Life of St. Germanus of Auxerre, Constantius of Lyon describes a confrontation between Germanus and a king of the Alans c. 446. This king had been ordered by Aetius to put down a revolt of Bagaudae in Armorica, but Germanus persuaded him to hold off his attack while he got confirmation of the orders from the emperor in Italy. Constantius gives the name of this king as "Eochar", but many historians see this as a scribal error for "Gochar" (since Goar's name appears in some sources in this form). Other historians object to this identification, since it would imply that Goar's career as leader of the Alans lasted over forty years.

Also, the Chronica Gallica of 452 reports that another Alan leader, Sambida, was given land around Valentia in 440, several years before Germanus' confrontation with the Alans. If only one kingdom of Alans is assumed to have existed in Gaul, this would imply that Goar had already been succeeded by Sambida before 440, and that Sambida was then succeeded by Eochar. If, on the other hand, two kingdoms are assumed, Eochar could be identical to Goar, a successor of Goar, or a successor of Sambida.

The Chronica Gallica describes another grant of land to Alans by Aetius two years later (442), in which the Romans occupying the land opposed the grant and had to be driven out by force. Neither the leader of these Alans, nor the location of the land, is mentioned in the Chronica; but many historians associate this event with Goar as well.

In any case, Goar's Alans are universally identified with the Alans of Orléans, who helped repel Attila's invasion in 451, and who were led at that time by Sangiban—putting the end of Goar's reign, if the identification with Eochar is accepted, somewhere between 446 and 450.
