= Vandal–Frankish war =

Vandal-Frankish war
- Residential area of the Franks
Date	406
Location	Near the Rhine
Result	Vandal-Alan victory

Belligerents
Hasdingi Vandals; Alans	Franks

Commanders and leaders
Godigisel; Respendial	unknown

Strength
± 40.000	± 40.000

Casualties and losses
20.000	unknown

The Vandal–Frankish War was a war of the Vandals against the Franks. The war took place prior to the Crossing of the Rhine in 406 and was the result of a Vandal attack in the residential area of the Franks by the Middle Rhine. Given the enormous impact of the events that subsequently took place in Gaul and which had a huge influence on the eventual fall of the Western Roman Empire, this war is seen as the run-up to it. It was decided by a Vandal victory. The Vandals were led by a king, rex Godegisel, while the Franks were led by several kings, of whom no names are given.

== Sources ==
The only written account mentioning the war is of Gregory of Tours, a 6th-century bishop and historian who used the books of Renatus Profuturus Frigeridus as a source for his own history work "Historia Francorum". The work of Frigeridus has not survived and is only known because Gregory of Tours quoted him extensively. Later historians have related comments from Prosper and Orosius about the Vandals and Alans and passages from the Gallic Chronicle of 452 and the Historia Nova' of Zosimus to the war between the Vandals and Franks.

== Background ==
Early 5th century, the Franks supplied on the Middle Rhine troops to the Limitanei in the northernmost provinces Germania Prima and Germania Secunda. These border troops were charges of guarding the Limes, the Rhine border that kept the Roman Empire separate from Germany. Their main settlement area was east of the Rhine, near Cologne via Mainz to Worms and Speyer. The Frankish tribes to the north of this were called Salians and in the south lived the Alemanni, peoples who also provided soldiers to the Roman army.

In the course of 406, the Vandals and in their wake the Alans appeared on Frankish territory. Where they came from is a question in itself, to which a clear answer cannot be given. The most plausible explanation is that they were drifting barbarians who were in fact a remnant of Radagaisus' third army. By Stilicho they were defeated in the war against Radegais of 405 and then they fled across the Alps to Raetia. Presumably there were several reasons for their arrival, of which the possibility of settling in the Roman Empire is perhaps the most important. The Vandals who invaded the residential area of the Ripuarians were Hasdingi, the western branch of this people. The Silingi, the other branch was located more east, in the "Vandal Mountains" in the Sudeten. This group also moved west, as did groups Suebi.

The Vandals were led by Godigisel and the Alans by Respendial. According to Liebesschuetz, the invasion required careful preparation and planning and the organizing and diplomatic brain behind it was the Godigisel of the Asding Vandals. Nevertheless, it seems that the two captains operated separately, because the Vandals went into battle in the decisive battle with the Franks without the Alans.

== Start ==
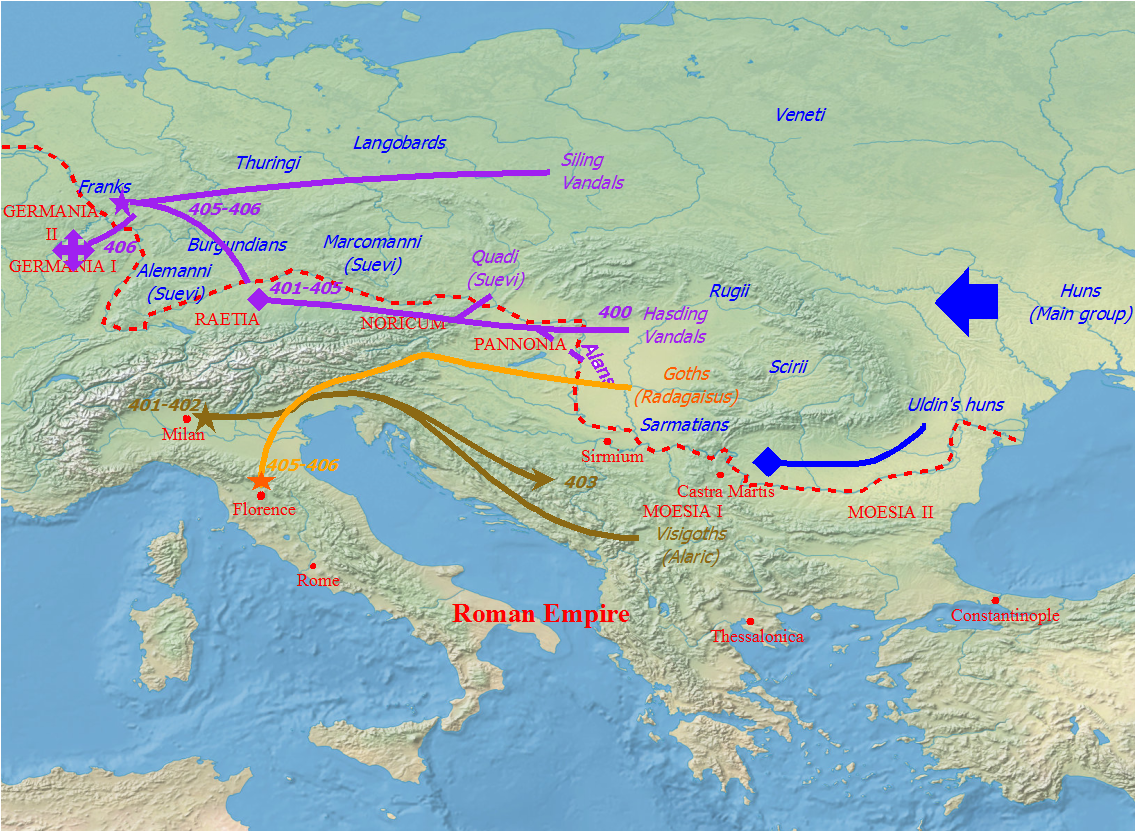
Arrival of the Barbarians

The arrival of the Vandal and Alan refugees led to conflicts with the Franks and Alemanns. Probably several confrontations took place in which the Franks tried to protect their own territory and possibly also the Roman border as foederati, while the Vandals either tried to obtain a similar foederati status on the east bank as the Franks, Alemanns and Burgundians, or tried to cross the Rhine.

=== Decisive battle ===
Most is unclear about the course of the war, because the sources are inadequate. Frigeridus only gives information about the decisive battle between the Vandals and the Franks in which Godegisel was killed. Initial he fought the Franks without the Alans of Respendialis. Frigeridus mentioned that the Vandals lost about 20,000 warriors in these battles, including their captain. These numbers are probably excessive, but the losses of the Vandals must have been great. The Franks were initially the upper party, but when the situation threatened to become desperate for the Vandals, they suddenly received help from the Alans. United they defeated the Franks in the decisive battle.

Frigeridus did not give a date or a precise location for this battle; he only indicated that the Alan army was 'turning from the Rhine' to intervene in the Vandal–Frankish War. From which it can be seen that it must have taken place at some distance from the river. MacDowall estimated that this last battle probably took place sometime in the summer or autumn of 406.

== Aftereffects ==
The final victory of the Vandals and Alans over the Franks marked the end of the Vandal–Frankish War. Their goal had been achieved, the passage to the Roman Empire was no longer prevented, and it allowed the Vandals and their allies to stay in the Frankish territory on the Middle Rhine until they crossed the Rhine.

Nevertheless, and against the contemporary military logic that one stays in the winter quarters to wait for favorable weather conditions for the next campaign, Prosper claimed in his world chronicle that the Vandals and Alans crossed the Rhine in the middle of winter. According to MacDowall, this can only be understood if the barbarians suffered hunger and were desperate as the area they just had conquered was insufficient to provide enough food for everyone. It is possible that they could use the Roman Rhine bridge near Mainz during the crossing or that the migrating peoples just used boats. He bases this on the eighth century source of Hrabanus Maurus, who wrote about the life of Alban of Mainz. After the Hasdingi Vandals and Alans had passed the Limes they were followed by the newly arrived Silingen and Suebi.

== Primary sources ==
- Chronica Gallica of 452
- Olympiodorus, Fragments
- Prosper, Chronicles
- Zosimus, Historisch Nova
