= Respendial =

King

Respendial or Respindal was king of a group of Alans in western Europe in the early 5th century CE. After the Crossing of the Rhine in 405 or 406, Respendial's Alans invaded the Roman Empire. The other group of Alans was led by Goar, who joined the Romans.

== Biography ==
=== Vandal–Frankish war ===
Respendial is mentioned in the Frigeridus fragment, (Note: "Renatus Profuturus Frigeridus, whom we have already mentioned, in his story of the capture and destruction of Rome by the Goths, says: "Meantime when Goare had gone over to the Romans, Respendial, king of the Alamanni, turned the army of his people from the Rhine, since the Vandals were getting the worse of the war with the Franks, having lost their king Godegisil, and about 20,000 of the army, and all the Vandals would have been exterminated if the army of the Alamanni [note: Alamanni for Alani] had not come to their aid in time." It is surprising to us that when he [=Frigeridus] names the kings of the other nations he does not name the king of the Franks as well." – Gregory of Tours quoting Frigeridus (the Frigeridus fragment) in History of the Franks (Book II, Chapter 9).) embedded in Gregory of Tours's work, describing the Vandal–Frankish war that preceded the Crossing of the Rhine (the crossing was dated to 31 December 406 by Prosper of Aquitaine). According to Frigeridus, the Roman-allied Franks were inflicting heavy casualties on the Vandals over the course of probably several battles, killing 20,000 Vandal warriors and their king Godigisel. They were on the verge of exterminating the tribe. At that point – according to MacDowall (2016) probably in the summer or autumn of 406 – another Alan king, Respendial, came to the Vandals' rescue and defeated the Franks, "although Goar had gone over to the Romans."

=== Into Gaul and Spain ===
After that, the Vandals and Respendial's Alans crossed the Rhine. It's unclear from Frigeridus' account what happened to Goar's Alans, but other sources make clear that they were eventually settled in Gaul near Orléans by the Romans. At the same time, the Vandals, Suebi, and Respendial's Alans continued into Spain. According to bishop Hydatius' chronicle, the Vandals (Silings and Asdings) were the first to arrive in Spain in September or October 409, while Gregory notes that Suebi and Alans (presumably those led by Respendial) followed them later.

Respendial's fate is unknown; by 418, he was no longer king. He had been succeeded by Attaces, who was killed when the Visigoths invaded Hispania. This group of Alans after that united with the Asding Vandals, with whom they crossed into Africa and established an independent kingdom.
