= 424 (disambiguation) =

424 is a year in the 5th century of the Gregorian calendar.

424 or 4-2-4 may also refer to:

- 424 BC, a year in the 5th century BC of the Gregorian calendar
- MÁV Class 424, a class of Hungarian steam locomotives
- Area code 424, California, United States
- 4-2-4 (locomotive), a steam locomotive configuration in Whyte notation
- 4-2-4 (association football), an association football (soccer) field formation
