= Frigeridus =

Frigeridus may refer to:

- Frigeridus (dux), Roman general, commander of the army of Pannonia Valeria under Gratian, fought in the Gothic War (376–382)
- Renatus Profuturus Frigeridus, 5th-century historian
