= Lacringi =

Ancient Germanic people

The Lacringi were an ancient Germanic tribe who participated in the Marcomannic Wars during the reign of Emperor Marcus Aurelius. After the tribes' initial crossing of the Danube was pushed back, their Vandal allies, the Astingi staged another incursion. Fearing the Roman response, the Lacringi turned on their allies and routed them in a surprise attack.

== See also ==
- List of Germanic tribes
