= Wisimar =

Wisimar or Visimar (?-335) was a Vandal ruler of the Hasdingi tribe during the 4th century in Europe. Although this historical figure is overwhelmingly shadowed by a lack of historical data, he is noted as one of the early monarchs of the Vandals. His territorial extent occupied regions of today's Transilvania in Romania, Tisza in Ukraine and a part of then-Roman province Dacia. It is most likely that he died during the neighboring Visigoth breakthrough of Geberic in 335.

== See also ==
- Fastida
