= Attaces =

King of the western Alans (died 418)

Addac or Attaces (died 418) was king of the western Alans in Hispania (the Iberian Peninsula, modern Spain and Portugal). In 409, the Alans settled in the provinces of Lusitania and Carthaginiensis: Alani Lusitaniam et Carthaginiensem provincias, et Wandali cognomine Silingi Baeticam sortiuntur. Some doubt whether the Alans held all or just parts of Carthaginiensis.

He was the successor of Respendial, who led the Alans, together with the Vandals and Suevi, on an invasion of the Western Roman Empire beginning in 406. In 418 Attaces was defeated and killed in battle during the Gothic war in Spain with the Visigothic king Wallia, who had attacked the invading tribes on behalf of the emperor Honorius, in "Tartessian" lands, probably near Gibraltar. The remainder of the western Alans in Iberia appealed to the Vandal king Gunderic to accept the Alan crown. Later Vandal kings in North Africa styled themselves rex Wandalorum et Alanorum (King of the Vandals and Alans).

== See also ==
- Cindazunda

== Sources ==
- Bury, J. B. History of the Later Roman Empire. Macmillan & Co. Ltd., 1923.
- Hydatius. Continuatio chronicorum Hieronymianorum.
