= Fastida =

King of the Gepidae

Fastida was a king of the Gepidae of the 3rd century. His battle against the Visigoths resulted in defeat, and was chronicled in Getica by Jordanes. He is the first Gepidic king whose name survives.

== See also ==
- Geberic
- Visimar
