= Silingi =

Germanic tribe in Silesia

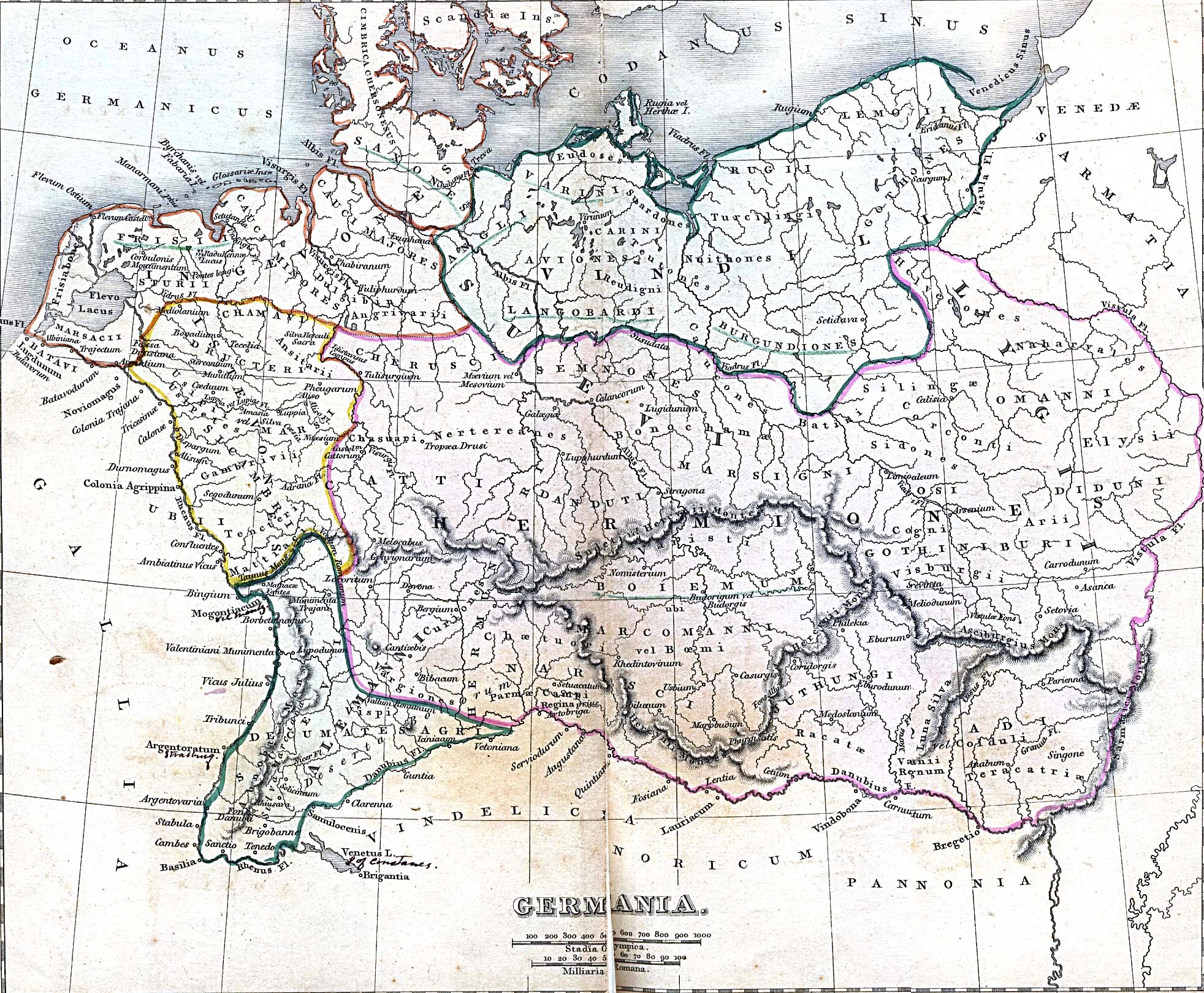
Depiction of Magna Germania in the early 2nd century, including the location of the Silingi

The Silings or Silingi (Latin: Silingae; Ancient Greek: Σιλίγγαι – Silingai) were a Germanic tribe, part of the larger Vandal group. The Silingi at one point lived in Silesia, and the names Silesia and Silingi may be related.

== History ==
The Silingi are first mentioned by Claudius Ptolemaeus in the 2nd century, who wrote that they had lived south of the Suevic Semnones, and like them they lived on both sides of the Elbe river. To their east, across the river Suevus (probably the Oder river) were a Lugian people called the Omani, and south of them were the Calucones.

The tribe of Nahanarvali is speculated by some modern scholars to be the same people as the Silingi. Tacitus Germania, 43 mentions the Naharvali as the keepers of sanctuary of the Lugii (the grove to twin gods Alcis). This speculation is based only on the fact that Tacitus, who does not mention the Silingi, places the Naharvali in roughly the same geographical area in which Ptolemaeus placed the Silingi.

According to some historians, during the reign of the Roman Emperor Marcus Aurelius (A.D. 161–180), the Silingi must have been among the Vandals who were reported to have lived in the "Vandal mountains", possibly the Sudetes, which are now part of the Czech Republic.

Pushed westwards by the Huns around 400, the Vandals crossed the Rhine into Gaul in 406 and the Pyrenees into Iberia in 409. While the other main Vandal group, the Hasdingi, settled in Gallaecia, the Silingi settled in Baetica. In 419, following Roman-sponsored attacks by the Visigoths against the Silingi in 417–18, the remnants of Silingi and the Alans voluntarily subjected to the rule Hasdingian leader Gunderic, who had fled from Gallaecia to Baetica after having been defeated by a Roman-Suebi coalition. After Gunderic's succession by Genseric in 428, the Vandals relocated to North Africa, where they established a kingdom centered at Carthage. The kingdom collapsed in the Vandalic War of 533–4, in which Justinian I managed to reconquer the Africa province for the Eastern Roman (Byzantine) Empire.

After the migratory movement of the 5th century, any Silingi remaining in Silesia were most likely slowly replaced in the sixth century by an influx of people holding the Prague-Korchak cultures, who are supposed to be new Slavic tribes migrating from the east.

== The region of Silesia ==
According to some historians, the names of Silesia and the Silingi are related. Another hypothesis derives the name of the mountain and river, and hence the region, from the old Polish word "Ślągwa", meaning "humid" or "damp", reflecting the climate of the region.

The name of the territory of Silesia is often assumed to either derive from the river or the mountain now called the Ślęza River or Mount Ślęża. The hill was a religious center of the Silingi, situated south-south-east of modern-day Wrocław (Breslau), although the religious importance of the location dates back to the sun-worshipping people of the Lusatian culture, as early as 1300 B.C.

== Legacy ==
Corps Silingia Breslau (de) is a student organization (Studentenverbindung) that has been operating since 1877, currently (2010) in Cologne, Germany, as Corps Silingia Breslau zu Köln (Silingia Corps Wrocław in Cologne).

== See also ==
- List of ancient Germanic peoples
- Fredebal
- Silesians
- Silesian tribes
