= Gunderic =

King of the Vandals (c. 379 – 428)

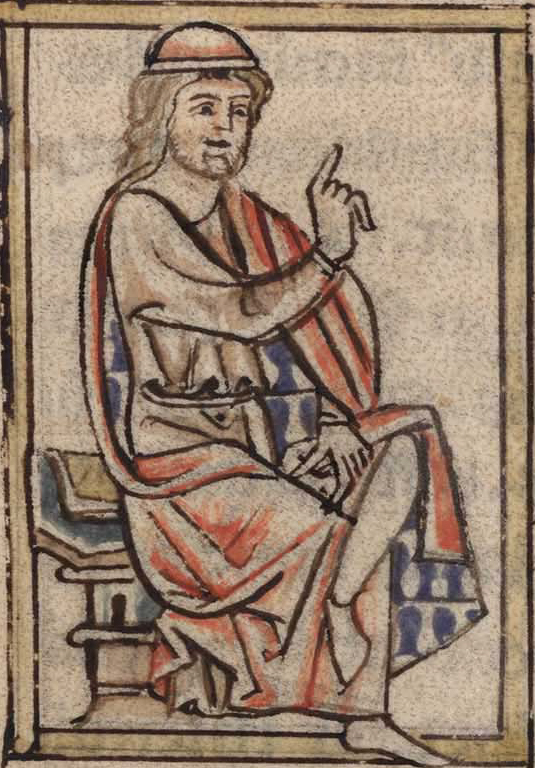
- Non-contemporary portrait of Gunderic from the Corpus Pelagianum made c. 13th century

King of the Vandals and Alans
- Reign: 418–428 AD
- Predecessor: himself as king of the Hasdingi Vandals
- Successor: Genseric

King of the Hasdingi Vandals
- Reign: 407–418 AD
- Predecessor: Godigisel
- Successor: himself as king of the Vandals and Alans
- Born: c. 379; Germania
- Died: 428 (aged 49); Sevilla, Visigothic Kingdom
- Father: Godigisel
- Mother: Flora
- Religion: Arianism

Gunderic (Latin: Gundericus; c. 379 – 428), King of Hasding Vandals (407–418), then King of Vandals and Alans (418–428), led the Hasding Vandals, a Germanic tribe originally residing near the Oder River, to take part in the barbarian invasions of the Western Roman Empire in the fifth century.

== History ==
He was a son of King Godigisel, the Hasdingi's Vandal king when his people breached the Rhine river frontier of the Empire on the last day of 406. During that year, the Vandals had become heavily involved in a war with the Franks, who were already settled as allies of the Romans, and who attempted to keep the Vandals out. Godigisel was killed in the fighting and Gunderic succeeded him.

Gunderic and his people ultimately crossed the Pyrenees into the Iberian Peninsula in October 409. With the Hasdingi portion of the Vandals he established the Kingdom in the Roman province of Gallaecia (north-western Iberia). They were driven out by the Visigoths in 418 on the orders of the Romans (the Visigoths were recalled and settled as a reward for their service in Aquitania). In 418 Attaces, the king of the Alans, fell in battle against the Visigoths, who at the time were allies of Rome, in Hispania, and most of the surviving Alans appealed to Gunderic who accepted their request and thus became King of the Vandals and Alans.

In 420 Comes Hispaniarum attacked the Vandals who had gone to war with the Sueves in Galicia where the tribes were confined after the Visigoths had severely defeated them in 418. The imperial vicar (head of a diocese) defeated Maximus, son of earlier usurper Gerontius (409), in 420–421, but it resulted in the Vandals moving south to Baetica. Conflicts with the Suebi drove him into Baetica in the south of Hispania, where he joined the surviving Silingi portion of the Vandals. The Vandals moved south to Baetica in 420–1. They defeated a Roman army, led by magister militum Castinus, outside the walls of Cordoba in 422.

The Vandals attacked Mauretania Tingitana, the Balearics, and sacked Cartagena and Seville in 425. They did not remain in these cities. Gunderic re-took the city in 428. The Vandals departed Spain in 429 and for 10 years Roman Spain was intact except for Galicia under the control of the Sueves. Hydatius writes that in 428 Gunderic laid "hands on the church of that very city, by the will of God he was seized by a demon and died." It is unclear how Gunderic died, however it is theorized that Hydatius' writing was in reference to Gunderic's attempt to convert a Catholic church to an Arian church.

The attempt was short-lived: not long after his attempt to seize the church in Hispalis, he unexpectedly died. After Gunderic died early in 428, the Vandals elected his half-brother Genseric as his successor, and Genseric left Iberia to the Visigoths in favor of invading Roman Africa.

== See also ==
- Vandal conquest of Roman Africa
- Vandal War (439-442)
- Vandal war of 422

Regnal titles
Preceded by Godigisel	King of the Vandals; 407–428	Succeeded by Genseric
