= Geberic =

King of the Goths of the fourth century AD

Geberic was a king of the Goths of the fourth century AD, reported in the 6th by Jordanes in his history of the Amal dynasty-led Goths, the Getica.

According to Jordanes, he succeeded Ariaric and conquered Dacia, which had become the territory of the Vandals, around 340 AD. The Vandals had been led by their king, Visimar. Their defeat led to the Vandals seeking and obtaining permission to settle in Pannonia.

Geberic spent the rest of his life fighting and died around 350 AD. According to Jordanes, Geberic was succeeded by Ermanaric as the sole King of the Goths. Ermanaric, who was described by Ammianus Marcellinus as a king of the Greuthungi, was defeated by Huns from the east, who had defeated and joined forces with Alans living near the Don river.

== See also ==
- Fastida
