= 424 =

424 in various calendars
- Gregorian calendar: 424; CDXXIV
- Ab urbe condita: 1177
- Assyrian calendar: 5174
- Balinese saka calendar: 345–346
- Bengali calendar: −170 – −169
- Berber calendar: 1374
- Buddhist calendar: 968
- Burmese calendar: −214
- Byzantine calendar: 5932–5933
- Chinese calendar: 癸亥年 (Water Pig); 3121 or 2914 — to — 甲子年 (Wood Rat); 3122 or 2915
- Coptic calendar: 140–141
- Discordian calendar: 1590
- Ethiopian calendar: 416–417
- Hebrew calendar: 4184–4185
- Hindu calendars
- Vikram Samvat: 480–481
- Shaka Samvat: 345–346
- Kali Yuga: 3524–3525
- Holocene calendar: 10424
- Iranian calendar: 198 BP – 197 BP
- Islamic calendar: 204 BH – 203 BH
- Javanese calendar: 308–309
- Julian calendar: 424; CDXXIV
- Korean calendar: 2757
- Minguo calendar: 1488 before ROC 民前1488年
- Nanakshahi calendar: −1044
- Seleucid era: 735/736 AG
- Thai solar calendar: 966–967
- Tibetan calendar: ཆུ་མོ་ཕག་ལོ་ (female Water-Boar); 550 or 169 or −603 — to — ཤིང་ཕོ་བྱི་བ་ལོ་ (male Wood-Rat); 551 or 170 or −602

Year 424 (CDXXIV) was a leap year starting on Tuesday of the Julian calendar. At the time, it was known as the Year of the Consulship of Castinus and Victor (or, less frequently, year 1177 Ab urbe condita). The denomination 424 for this year has been used since the early medieval period, when the Anno Domini calendar era became the prevalent method in Europe for naming years.

== Events ==
=== By place ===
==== Roman Empire ====
- April 22 – Flavius Anthemius Isidorus becomes the new Praetorian prefect of Illyricum, comprising most of Greece and Serbia, taking office at the capital, Sirmium (now Sremska Mitrovica in Serbia).
- October 23 – Emperor Theodosius II nominates his cousin Valentinian, age 5, the imperial title nobilissimus Caesar ("most noble") of the Western Roman Empire. Valentinian is betrothed to Theodosius's own daughter Licinia Eudoxia, who is only 2 years old.
- Roman usurper Joannes sends Flavius Aetius, governor of the Palace (cura palatii), to the Huns to ask for their assistance. After negotiating, he returns to Italy with a large force.
- Winter – A Roman army under the command of Ardaburius leaves Thessalonica (modern Central Macedonia) and marches for Northern Italy, where they make their base at Aquileia.

==== China ====
- July 7 – (Jing'ping era, 2nd year, 5th month (wǔyuè), the yi'you day) Emperor Shao of the Liu Song dynasty of China, is deposed by government ministers Xu Xianzhi and Fu Liang, who install his younger brother Prince Liu Yilong as the new Emperor.
- August 4 – (Jing'ping era, 2nd year, 6th month ( liùyuè), the guichou day) Former Emperor Shao of China, exiled to Suzhou is murdered by an assassin.
- September 17 – (Yuanjia era, 1st year, 8th month (bāyuè), dingyou day) Prince Liu Yilong is formally enthroned as the Emperor Wen of Song of China at its capital in Jiankang.

=== Religion ===
- Church of the East declares itself independent, under Catholicos of the East Dadisho.

== Death ==
- Shao Di, emperor of the Liu Song dynasty (b. 406)
