= Crossing of the Rhine =

Mixed group of barbarians invading Gaul (406)

- Part of the Migration Period and the Fall of the Western Roman Empire
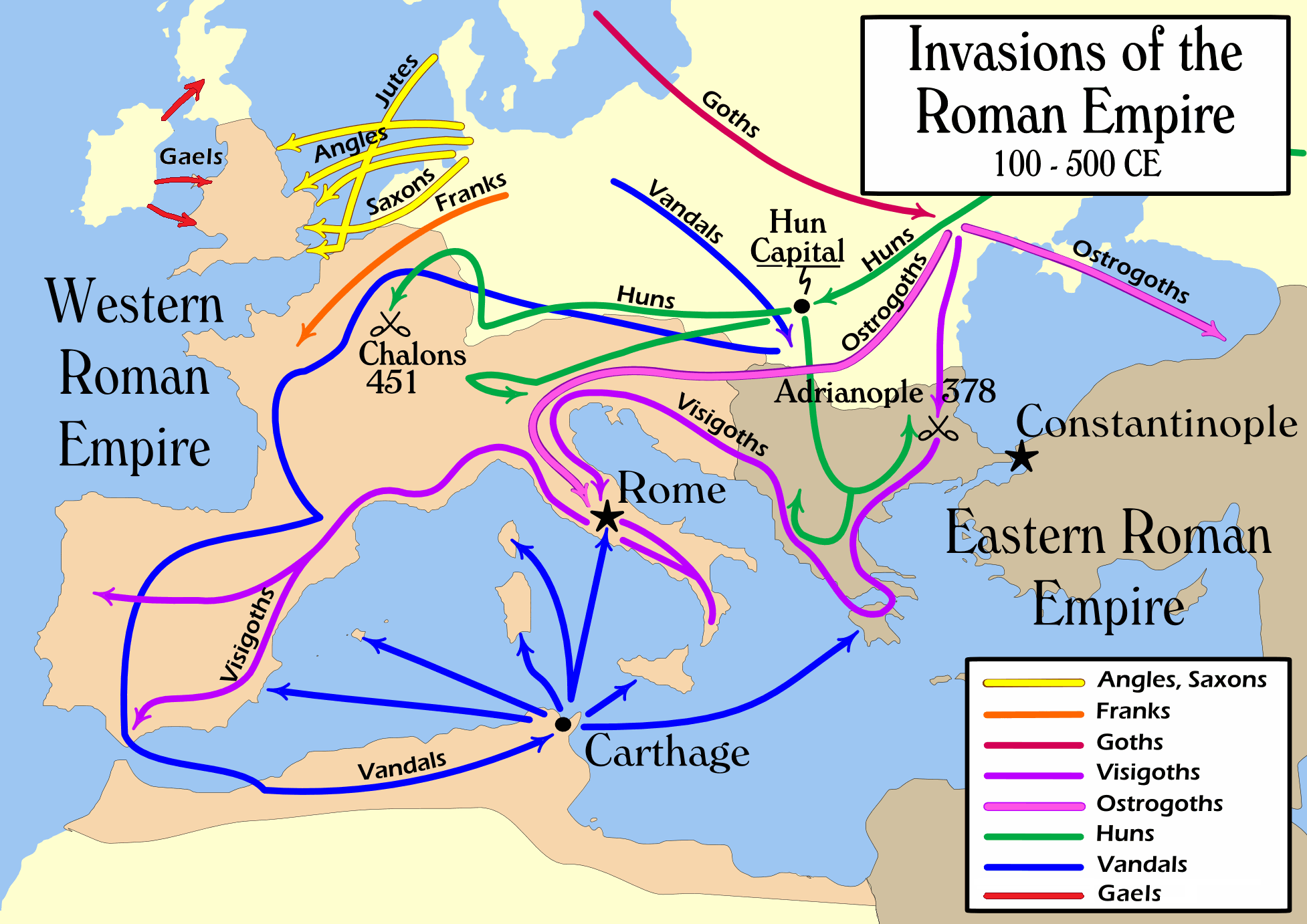
- Map showing the migration routes of the Vandals, Alans, and Suebi.
Date	31 December 406 AD (alternatively 405 AD)
Location	Near Mogontiacum (Mainz), Limes Germanicus
Result	Decisive Barbarian victory

Belligerents
Vandals; Hasdingi; Silingi; Alans Suebi	Western Roman Empire; Franks (Foederati); Limitanei (Border garrisons)

Commanders and leaders
Godigisel † (Vandals): Gunderic (Vandals); Respendial (Alans); Goar (Alans); Hermeric (Suebi)	Unknown Frankish dukes: Stilicho (Magister Militum, in absentia)

Strength
~200,000–400,000 total people; ~50,000 warriors	Unknown; Local Frankish militia; Depleted frontier garrisons

Casualties and losses
Heavy (estimated ~20,000 Vandals killed during initial Frankish resistance)	High; total destruction of local border units
- The Alans reportedly intervened to save the Vandals from total defeat by the Franks on the east bank before the crossing.

The crossing of the Rhine by a mixed group of Germanic and Sarmatian tribes which included Vandals, Alans and Suebi is traditionally considered to have occurred on 31 December 406. The crossing transgressed one of the Late Roman Empire's most secure limes or boundaries; as such, it has been considered a climactic moment in the decline of the empire. It initiated a wave of destruction of Roman cities and the collapse of Roman civic order in northern Gaul. That, in turn, occasioned the rise of three usurpers in succession in the province of Britannia. Therefore, the crossing of the Rhine is a marker date in the Migration Period during which various Germanic tribes moved westward and southward from southern Scandinavia and northern Germania.

== Ancient sources ==
Several written accounts document the crossing, supplemented by the timeline of Prosper of Aquitaine, which gives a firm date of 31 December 406 in his year-by-year chronicle: "In the sixth consulship of Arcadius and Probus, Vandals and Alans came into the Gauls, having crossed the Rhine, on the day before the kalends of January."

A letter by Saint Jerome, written from Bethlehem and dated 409, gives a long list of the barbarian tribes who had overrun all of Gaul at that time, including those who had crossed the Rhine: Quadi, Vandals, Sarmatians, Alans, Gepids, Herules, Saxons, Burgundians, Alemanni and, to the shame of the empire, Pannonians from within the empire. Jerome lists the cities now known as Mainz, Worms, Rheims, Amiens, Arras, Thérouanne, Tournai, Speyer and Strasbourg as having been pillaged. (Note: Jerome: “The once noble city of Moguntiacum [=Mainz] has been captured and destroyed. In its church many thousands have been massacred. The people of Vangionum [=Worms] after standing a long siege have been extirpated. The powerful city of Remorum [=Rheims], the Ambiani [=Amiens], the Altrebatæ [=Arras], the Morini [=Thérouanne] on the skirts, Tornacum [=Tournai], the Nemetæ [=Speyer], and Argentoratus [=Strasbourg] have fallen to Germania: while the provinces of Aquitaine and of Novempopulania, of Lugdunensis [=Lyon] and Narbonensis [=Narbonne] are, with the exception of a few cities, one universal scene of desolation. And those which the sword spares without, famine ravages within. I cannot speak without tears of Toulouse which has been kept from falling hitherto by the merits of its reverend bishop Exuperius. Even the Spains are on the brink of ruin and tremble daily as they recall the invasion of the Cymry; and, while others suffer misfortunes once in actual fact, they suffer them continually in anticipation." – Jerome, Letter 123 to Ageruchia (c. 409).) Jerome's account is highly stylised, and neither his list of peoples nor his list of cities can be taken at face value as they have sources in previous texts.

In his History of the Franks, the 6th-century historian Gregory of Tours embeds some short passages of a lost account by the 5th-century historian Renatus Profuturus Frigeridus of a war between the Vandals, Alans and Franks that took place in the Rhine region around the time of the crossing of the Rhine. (Note: "Renatus Profuturus Frigeridus, whom we have already mentioned, in his story of the capture and destruction of Rome by the Goths, says: "Meantime when Goare had gone over to the Romans, Respendial, king of the Alamanni, turned the army of his people from the Rhine, since the Vandals were getting the worse of the war with the Franks, having lost their king Godegisil, and about 20,000 of the army, and all the Vandals would have been exterminated if the army of the Alamanni [note: Alamanni for Alani] had not come to their aid in time." It is surprising to us that when he [=Frigeridus] names the kings of the other nations he does not name the king of the Franks as well." – Gregory of Tours quoting Frigeridus (the Frigeridus fragment) in History of the Franks (Book II, Chapter 9).) This text, known as the "Frigeridus fragment", may provide some clues about the circumstances preceding the crossing.

Olympiodorus of Thebes, a generally reliable contemporary historian, wrote an account of the crossing, of which only fragments have survived in quotations by Sozomen, Zosimus and Photius. 5th century Roman historian Orosius mentions the crossing in passing.

== Interpretation ==
=== Motives ===
Reconstructed map of the migration of Danubian peoples across the Rhine around 406

The initial gathering of barbarians on the east bank of the Rhine has been interpreted as a banding of refugees from the Huns or the remnants of Radagaisus's defeated Goths, without direct evidence. Scholars such as Walter Goffart and Guy Halsall have argued instead that the barbarian groups crossed the Rhine not (so much) because they were fleeing the Huns, but seized the opportunity to plunder and settle in Gaul when the Roman garrisons on the Rhine frontier were weakened or withdrawn in order to protect Italy. British historian Peter Heather argues that this hypothesis does not explain all the evidence, such as the fact that "the vast majority of the invaders who emerged from the middle Danubian region between 405 and 408 had not been living there in the fourth century", and that the evidence for any Roman military withdrawal from the northwest at this time was weak; escaping "the Hun-generated chaos and predation" was still a better explanation.

=== Vandal–Frankish war ===
According to the "Frigeridus fragment," there was a war between the Franks and the Vandals, in which the latter were losing. Frigeridus states that the Vandals lost around 20,000 warriors, including their king Godigisel, in these military engagements. When the Vandals' war situation was becoming desperate, the Alans (who he mistakenly labels Alamanni) came to the rescue of the Vandals, and the joint forces seem to have defeated the Franks in a decisive battle. Frigeridus does not mention a date nor a precise location for this battle; he only indicates that the Alan army "turned away from the Rhine" in order to intervene in the Vandal–Frankish war, so it must have taken place some distance away from the river.

Despite this, and against contemporary military logic of staying in the winter quarters to await more favourable weather for their next campaign, Prosper claims the Vandals and Alans crossed the Rhine in the middle of the winter, which MacDowall argues that would only make sense if they were starving and desperate, and if the lands they had just conquered from the Franks were insufficient to provide them with enough food for everyone.

=== Location ===
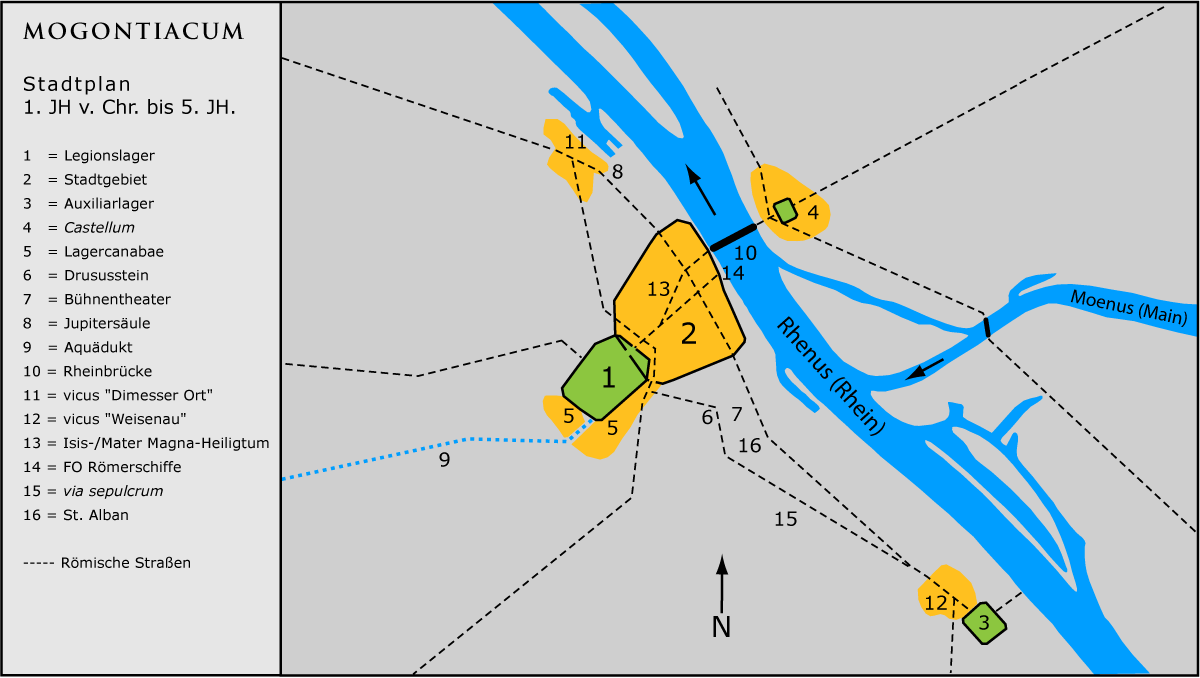
Reconstruction of Roman Mainz, with the Pons Ingeniosa bridge crossing the Rhine

Jerome mentions Mogontiacum first in his list of the cities devastated by the incursion. There was a Roman stone pillar bridge across the Rhine at Mogontiacum called the Pons Ingeniosa at that time, and the Vandals may have been starving (given the fact that they crossed the Rhine in mid-winter) and therefore decided to raid and plunder the city; this is why scholars such as MacDowall assume this to have been the location of the crossing of the Rhine. Worms (Vangionum) and Strasbourg (Argentoratum) are two other Roman cities on the Rhine reportedly sacked, so an initial traversal further to the south may seem equally plausible (if one is to assume that it was accompanied by plundering a city on the western bank, which isn't even necessary; these cities could have been pillaged any time between the 405/6 crossing and Jerome's 409 letter). There is no archaeological record of any early 5th century destruction in Worms, casting doubt on the records of its sacking. On the other hand, the downstream fortresses of Nijmegen (Noviomagus) and Cologne (Colonia) in the north were apparently left intact by the barbarians, as was Trier (Augusta Treverorum), situated a few days' march west of Mainz. As Jerome had lived in Trier until 370, it is likely he would have reported it if the invaders had attacked his former hometown, but he makes no such mention.

A frozen Rhine, making the crossing easier, is not attested by any contemporary source, but was a plausible surmise made by 18th-century historian Edward Gibbon. Although many later writers have since mentioned a frozen Rhine as if it were a fact, for Gibbon it was merely a hypothesis ("in a season when the waters of the Rhine were most probably frozen") to help explain why the Vandals, Alans and Suebi were able to cross the Rhine into Gaul with such apparent ease. It is also possible that they used a Roman Rhine bridge, or that the migrating peoples simply used boats.

It is not clear why the Germanic bands crossing the Rhine apparently met no organised military resistance on the Roman side. A common hypothesis is that Roman general Stilicho may have depleted the garrisons on the Rhine border in 402 to face the Visigothic invasion of Alaric I in Italy. Goffart argues in favour of this hypothesis based on the writings of the contemporary poet Claudian, who knew Stilicho personally; the general supposedly entrusted the defence of the Rhine frontier to the Franks and Alamanni, who were Roman foederati, for the time being until the Goths had been driven out of Italy. Furthermore, he interpreted the "Frigeridus fragment" as showing the Franks being initially successful in preventing the Vandals from crossing the Rhine, but that they could no longer hold them back when the Alans joined the fray. However, Heather (2009) points out that the evidence for any Roman military withdrawal from the northwest at this time is weak.

== Alternative dating ==
A 2000 article by Michael Kulikowski, finding that in traditional historiography "the sequence of events bristles with technical difficulties", bypasses modern historians' accounts, which he finds to have depended upon Gibbon and one another, and reanalysed the literary sources. His conclusion is that a date for the mid-winter crossing of the Rhine of 31 December 405 offers a more coherent chronology of events in Belgica, Gaul and Britannia. However, Kulikowski's dating theory, which is a revival of arguments that were put forward by Norman H. Baynes, was forcefully challenged by Anthony Birley.

Kulikowski outlines how 406 came to be selected. The sixth consulship of Arcadius, with Probus as co-consul, corresponds to 406. Prosper notes the invasion of Italy by Radagaisus as the prime event of 405, as well as his death which actually occurred in 406, and he correctly assigns to 407 the usurpation of Constantine III. "The three entries are linked, and together they tell a kind of story", Kulikowski observes. "Prosper was writing a chronicle, and the genre abhorred blank years. Since his chosen genre demanded an entry for each of three years, Prosper simply portioned out his sequence of events, one event to the year. He does the same thing elsewhere in the chronicle".

Kulikowski notes a contradiction between Prosper's date and the assertions made by a fragment of Olympiodorus of Thebes, Zosimus's New History (vi.3.1) and Orosius that the Rhine crossing and the presence of barbarians in Gaul provoked the usurpation of Marcus in Britannia: the latter occurred in the course of 406, thus preceded the 31 December 406 date, and therefore the Rhine crossing must have happened earlier. Kulikowski's proposed date of 31 December 405 places the acclamation of the first of the usurpers in Britannia, which was characterised as a fearful reaction to the barbarian presence in Gaul, after the crossing of the Rhine.

With the traditional date of 31 December 406 in mind, much has been made of the inaction of Stilicho, which is sometimes imputed to his strategy focussed on ambitions in Illyria. Kulikowski's date of 31 December 405 places Stilicho fully occupied in Tuscia battling the forces of Radagaisus, who was finally overcome and executed at the Battle of Faesulae in August 406.

== Aftermath ==
Reconstruction of the 407–409 sack of Gaul, based on Peter Heather (2005)

According to bishop Hydatius of Aquae Flaviae, the barbarians crossed into Spain in September or October 409; little is known about the acts of the Vandals, Alans and Suevi in Gaul between the crossing of the Rhine and their invasion of Spain. Gregory of Tours only mentions "the Vandals left their own country and burst into the Gauls under King Gunderic. And when the Gauls had been thoroughly laid waste they made for the Spains. The Suebi, that is, Alamanni, following them, seized Gallaecia." Based on Jerome's letter, Kulikowski argues that the Vandals, Alans and Suebi probably mostly stayed in northern Gaul until at least the spring of 409 (the earliest possible date of Jerome's letter), because almost all cities pillaged by the barbarians listed by Jerome were located in the north, and the southern city of Toulouse (Tolosa) had so far been able to repel the invaders, and they had not yet crossed into Spain.
