= Godigisel =

King of the Vandals (c. 359 – c. 406)

Godigisel (c. 359 – c. 406) was King of the Hasdingi Vandals until his death in 406. It is unclear when or how he became king; however, in 405 he formed and led a coalition of Germanic peoples, including the Hasdingi Vandals, Silingi Vandals, Suebi, and others from Pannonia with the intention of invading Roman Gaul. Before crossing the Rhine River into Gaul, he was killed in the Vandal–Frankish war, possibly in late 406. Shortly after his death (traditionally dated to 31 December 406), this group of Vandals and their allies crossed the Rhine, possibly while it was frozen, into the territory of the Roman Empire.

Godigisel was succeeded by his eldest surviving son, Gunderic. Godigisel was also the father of Genseric, who succeeded Gunderic.

== Notes ==
Regnal titles
Unknown	King of the Vandals; Through 406	Succeeded by Gunderic
