= Renatus Profuturus Frigeridus =

Renatus Profuturus Frigeridus was a fifth-century historian. He wrote a historical work of twelve volumes. It exists today only in brief fragments, a few passages having survived in chapters eight and nine of the second book of Gregory of Tours' Decem libri historiarum (Ten Books of Histories). Gregory likewise preserves some quoted material from the late fourth-century historian Sulpicius Alexander.
