= 410s =

Decade

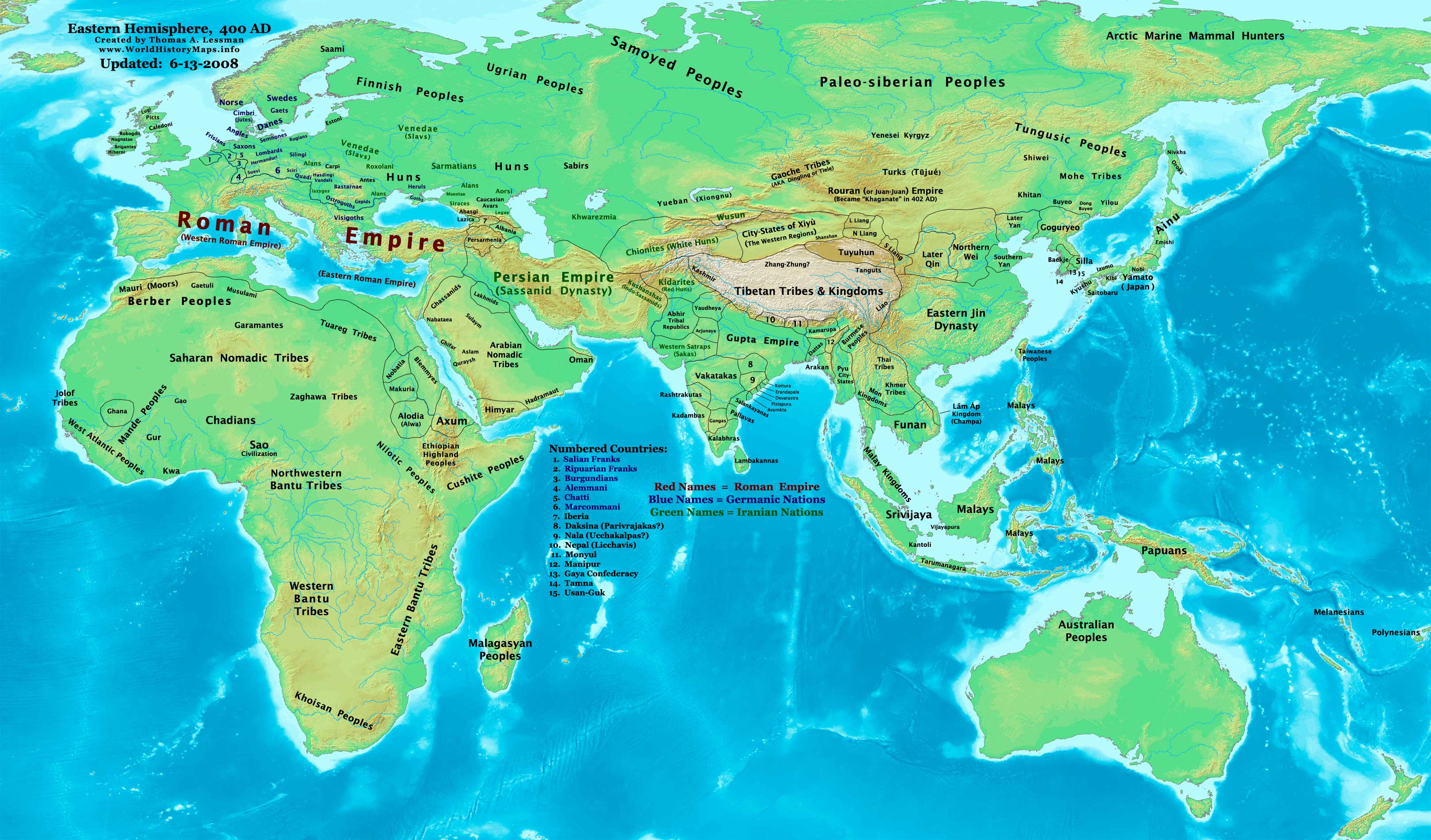
Eastern Hemisphere in 400 AD

The 410s decade ran from January 1, 410, to December 31, 419.

== Events ==
=== 410 ===
==== By place ====
====== Roman Empire ======
- Spring – Constantine III crosses the Alps into Liguria (Northern Italy), but retreats to Gaul after Gerontius revolts in Spain against his son Constans II.
- Raiders from Ireland, such as the Uí Liatháin and Laigin, harry the coasts of Wales. They plunder towns and capture slaves but later colonise large areas of what is called Gwynedd, in particular Llŷn, the coasts of Arllechwedd, Arfon and the Isle of Mona (approximate date).
- Flavius Constantius, Roman general and politician, is promoted to the rank of magister militum. He becomes the imperial adviser of Honorius, and the power behind the throne in the Western Roman Empire.
- The Eastern Roman Empire sends six legions (6,000 men) to aid Honorius at Ravenna. He negotiates with King Alaric I, who ceremonially deposes Priscus Attalus as co-emperor.
- August 24 – The Visigoths under Alaric I sack Rome after a third siege. Slaves open the Salarian Gate and Goths loot the city for three days; according to Augustine in The City of God and others, comparatively few Roman men are killed and women raped. Only two churches are burned, and people who took refuge in churches are usually spared. Many Romans who survived the Sack flee to Africa, or to the Eastern Empire (see Saint Jerome). It is the first time since 390 BC that Rome has fallen to an enemy. This marks the decline of the Roman Empire. Only 45 years later, in 455 AD, Rome will again be sacked, this time by the Vandals who will kill, burn, and loot much more ferociously than the Visigoths in 410 AD.
- Galla Placidia, daughter of Theodosius I, is captured by the Visigoths and becomes a hostage during their move from the Italian Peninsula to Gaul.
- Alaric I marches southwards into Calabria and makes plans to invade Africa. But a storm destroys his Gothic fleet and many of his soldiers drown. Alaric dies in Cosenza, probably of fever, and his body is buried along with his treasure under the riverbed of the Busento. He is succeeded by his brother-in-law Ataulf, who becomes king of the Visigoths.
- According to Zosimus, this is the year when Emperor Honorius sends his Rescript (diplomatic letters) to the Romano-British magistrates, ending Roman rule in Great Britain. However this is likely an example of scribal error. Most recently, David Woods has argued that the account refers instead to Raetia, a Roman province north of Italy.

====== Britain ======
- At around this time, one of the first Anglo-Saxon settlements in Britain, Mucking, is established by the mouth of the Thames River. (approximate date)

====== Europe ======
- The city of Aléria on the island of Corsica is devastated by a huge fire, destroying its port and most of its inhabitants.

====== Asia ======
- Prithivisena becomes king of the Vakataka in the Deccan (India).

==== By topic ====
====== Religion ======
- Council of Seleucia: Persian Christians create a national church and adopt the Nicene Creed.
- Honoratus founds the Monastery of Lérins on the île Saint-Honorat (France), and forms a monastic community.

=== 411 ===
==== By place ====
====== Roman Empire ======
- Emperor Honorius sends two Roman generals to deal with the usurper Constantine III in Gaul. They kill Gerontius, Constantine's rebellious general (magister militum) in Spain, then besiege Arles and defeat Constantine III. He is taken prisoner and put to death at Ravenna.
- Following the defeat of Constantine III, the Burgundians and the Gallic nobility proclaim Jovinus, Gallo-Roman senator, emperor of the Western Roman Empire at Mogontiacum (modern Mainz).

====== Europe ======
- King Ataulf leads the Goths into Gaul at the instigation of Honorius, who promises to recognise a Visigothic Kingdom if he defeats the several usurpers who threaten the Roman Empire.
- The Alans establish their rule in the Roman province of Lusitania (Portugal south of the Duero River and Spain).
- The Teutonic tribes in Spain join the Roman Empire as foederati (allies with military commitments).

====== Asia ======
- Ingyo succeeds his brother Hanzei, and becomes the 19th emperor of Japan.

==== By topic ====
====== Religion ======
- Rabbula becomes bishop of Edessa.
- The Councils of Carthage are held, on the issue of Donatism.

=== 412 ===
==== By place ====
====== Roman Empire ======
- The Visigoths, led by King Ataulf, move into the south of Gaul. He establishes his residence at Narbonne, and makes an alliance with Emperor Honorius, against the usurper Jovinus.
- Emperor Jovinus elevates his brother Sebastianus as co-emperor (Augustus) and takes control of Gaul.
- Heraclianus, governor (Comes Africae), revolts against Honorius and proclaims himself Augustus. He interrupts the grain supply to Rome. Honorius condemns him and his supporters to death with an edict at Ravenna.
- The Theodosian Walls are constructed at Constantinople during the reign of emperor Theodosius II. The work is carried out under supervision of Anthemius, notable praetorian prefect of the East.
- Winter – Olympiodorus, historical writer, is sent on an embassy by Honorius, and sails in stormy weather around Greece up the Black Sea, to meet the Huns who are located on the middle Danube (modern Bulgaria).

====== Balkans ======
- The forts on the west bank of the Danube, which were destroyed by the Huns, are rebuilt, and a new Danubian fleet is launched.

==== By topic ====
====== Religion ======
- An edict of Honorius outlaws Donatism.
- Cyril of Alexandria becomes Patriarch of Alexandria.
- Lazarus, bishop of Aix-en-Provence, and Herod, bishop of Arles, are expelled from their sees on a charge of Manichaeism.
- Fa-Hien, Chinese Buddhist monk, spends 2 years in Ceylon and is more than 200 days at sea as storms drive his ship off its course, but returns with sacred Buddhist texts back to China (see 414).

=== 413 ===
==== By place ====
====== Roman Empire ======
- Heraclianus, Roman usurper, lands in Italy with a large army to fight Emperor Honorius. He is defeated in Umbria and flees to Carthage, where he is put to death by envoys of Honorius.
- May 8 – Honorius signs an edict providing tax relief for the Italian provinces Tuscia, Campania, Picenum, Samnium, Apulia, Lucania and Calabria, which were plundered by the Visigoths.
- The Visigoths, led by King Ataulf, conquer the towns of Toulouse and Bordeaux by force of arms. After a successful siege of Valence, he captures the usurper Jovinus and his brother Sebastianus. In Narbonne they are executed and their heads are sent to Honorius' court at Ravenna.

====== Asia ======
- Kumaragupta I succeeds his father Chandragupta II as emperor of the Gupta Empire (India).
- Jangsu becomes ruler of the Korean kingdom of Goguryeo.

==== By topic ====
====== Religion ======
- Augustine of Hippo, age 59, begins to write his spiritual book De Civitate Dei (City of God), as a reply to the charge that Christianity was responsible for the decline of the Roman Empire.

=== 414 ===
==== By place ====
====== Roman Empire ======
- January 1 – Galla Placidia, half-sister of emperor Honorius, is married to the Visigothic king Ataulf at Narbonne. The wedding is celebrated with Roman festivities and magnificent gifts from the Gothic booty.
- July 4 – Emperor Theodosius II, age 13, yields power to his older sister Aelia Pulcheria, who reigns as regent and proclaims herself empress (Augusta) of the Eastern Roman Empire.
- Constantius III, Roman general (magister militum), begins a military campaign against the Visigoths in Gaul. He blockades the Gallic ports and besieges Marseille.
- Priscus Attalus is proclaimed rival emperor by the Visigoths for a second time at Bordeaux, in order to impose their terms on Honorius, who has his residence in Ravenna.

====== Asia ======
- The Southern Liang, a state of the Sixteen Kingdoms during the Jin Dynasty, comes to an end.

==== By topic ====
====== Religion ======
- Fa-Hien, Chinese Buddhist monk, returns from India and begins translating Buddhist works into Chinese.
- Abdas, bishop of Susa, burns down a Zoroastrian temple; in retaliation, King Yazdegerd I of Persia orders the destruction of churches.

=== 415 ===
==== By place ====
====== Roman Empire ======
- Constantius, Roman general (magister militum), drives the Visigoths out of Gaul. He captures the usurper Priscus Attalus, and sends him under military escort to Ravenna.
- The Visigoths invade the Iberian Peninsula and begin to conquer territory taken previously by the Vandals. King Athaulf and his pregnant wife Galla Placidia leave Gallia Narbonensis; they relocate at Barcelona. Their infant son, Theodosius, dies in infancy, eliminating an opportunity for a Roman-Visigothic line. Athaulf is assassinated in the palace while taking a bath. Sigeric succeeds him, but after a reign of seven days he is also murdered.
- Autumn – Wallia, brother of Athaulf, becomes king of the Visigoths. He accepts a peace treaty with emperor Honorius, in return for a supply of 600,000 measures of grain. After the negotiations he sends Placidia to Rome with hostages.

====== Asia ======
- March 18 – The Daysan River floods Edessa, Mesopotamia.

==== By topic ====
====== Religion ======
- March – Hypatia of Alexandria, Neoplatonist philosopher, is murdered by a Christian mob of Nitrian monks at the church (former temple conceived by Cleopatra VII) called Caesareum. Having driven out the Jews, Alexandria's new patriarch, Cyril, has instigated the mob after taking offense at Hypatia's scientific rationalism (approximate date).
- John Cassian, Christian theologian, settles at a monastery in Marseille (Gaul); he organizes monastic communities after an eastern model.
- The Eustathian schism in Antioch is healed (approximate date).

=== 416 ===
==== By place ====
====== Roman Empire ======
- Priscus Attalus, Roman usurper, is forced to participate in a triumph celebrated by Emperor Honorius, in the streets of Rome. After the festivities, he is exiled to the Lipari Islands (north of Sicily).

====== Europe ======
- The Visigoths continue their invasion of Hispania, and take control of Tarraconensis. King Wallia occupies the gold mines at Las Médulas, and forces Jewish citizens to convert to Christianity.

====== Asia ======
- Reports of the eruption of Krakatoa are recorded in a Javanese historical chronicle called the Book of Kings.

==== By topic ====
====== Arts and Sciences ======
- Rutilius Claudius Namatianus begins his journey home from Rome to Gaul. This becomes the subject of his unfinished poem, De Reditu Suo.

=== 417 ===
==== By place ====
====== Roman Empire ======
- January 1 – Emperor Honorius forces his half-sister Galla Placidia into marriage to Constantius, his general (magister militum). He is appointed patricius and becomes a prominent member of the House of Theodosius.
- The Visigoths are granted Aquitaine, and become allies (foederati) of the Western Roman Empire. King Wallia establishes his capital at Toulouse.

====== Asia ======
- Nulji becomes king of the Korean kingdom of Silla.

==== By topic ====
====== Religion ======
- January – Pope Innocent I condemns Pelagianism, and excommunicates the ascetic Pelagius.
- March 12 – Innocent I dies after a 16-year reign in which he has restored relations between the sees of Rome and Antioch, enforced celibacy of the clergy, and maintained the right of the bishop of Rome to judge appeals from other churches. Innocent is succeeded by Zosimus as the 41st pope.

=== 418 ===
==== By place ====
====== Roman Empire ======
- Emperor Honorius bribes Wallia, king of the Visigoths, into regaining Hispania for the Roman Empire. His victory over the Vandals in 416 forces them to retire to Baetica. The Visigothic territory in Gaul now extends from the Garonne to the Loire, and becomes known as the Visigothic Kingdom.
- Theodoric I becomes king of the Visigoths. He completes the settlements in Gallia Aquitania and expands his military power to the south.

==== By topic ====
====== Religion ======
- December 28 – Pope Boniface I succeeds Zosimus as the 42nd pope.
- Eulalius is elected antipope of Rome. He claims in a letter to Honorius his recognition as pope.

=== 419 ===
==== By place ====
====== Roman Empire ======
- A law is passed, prohibiting the act of instructing barbarians on shipbuilding in the Western and Eastern Roman Empires.

====== China ======
- Jin Gongdi, age 33, succeeds his developmentally disabled brother Jin Andi as emperor of the Eastern Jin Dynasty. Andi is strangled by orders of the warlord Liu Yu.

== Births ==
410

- Pope Gelasius I, Pope in Catholic church (d. 496)
- Severinus of Noricum, monk and saint (approximate date)

411

- Merovech, Founder of the Merovingian dynasty and grandfather of Clovis I (approximate date)

412

- February 8 – Proclus, Greek Neoplatonist philosopher (d. 485)
- Lu Huinan, empress dowager of the Liu Song dynasty (d. 466)

417

- Peter the Iberian, Georgian theologian and Saint (approximate date)
- Justa Grata Honoria, daughter of Constantius III (approximate date)

418

- Ricimer, Germanic Roman general
- Yuryaku, emperor of Japan (approximate date)

419

- July 2 – Valentinian III, emperor of the Western Roman Empire (d. 455)

== Deaths ==
410

- Alaric I, king of the Visigoths
- Hanzei, emperor of Japan (approximate date)
- Maron, Syriac Christian monk
- Murong Chao, emperor of Southern Yan (b. 385)
- Yujiulü Shelun, khagan (emperor) of Xianbei

411

- September 18 – Constantine III, Roman usurper
- Constans II, usurper and son of Constantine III
- Gerontius, Roman general
- Gundomar I, king of Burgundy
- Yax Nuun Ayiin I, king of Tikal (Guatemala) (approximate date)

412

- October 15 – Theophilus, Patriarch of Alexandria
- Gwanggaeto the Great, king of Goguryeo (b. 374)
- Qifu Gangui, prince of the Xianbei state Western Qin
- Sarus, Gothic chieftain
- Uldin, chieftain of the Huns
- Wang Shen'ai, empress of the Jin dynasty (born 384)

413

- March 7 – Heraclianus, Roman usurper
- September 13 – Marcellinus of Carthage, martyr and saint
- Chandragupta II, emperor of the Gupta Empire
- Jovinus, Roman usurper of Gaul
- Kumarajiva, Buddhist monk and translator (b. 344)
- Prudentius, Roman Christian poet (b. 348)
- Sebastianus, Roman usurper and brother of Jovinus
- Qiao Zong, warlord and prince of Chengdu

414

- Synesius, bishop of Ptolemais (approximate date)
- Yujiulü Hulü, ruler of the Rouran Khaganate (Mongolia)

415

- March – Hypatia of Alexandria, female Neoplatonist philosopher, murdered
- August 15 – Athaulf, king of the Visigoths, assassinated
- August 22 – Sigeric, king of the Visigoths, assassinated
- Chandragupta II, emperor of the Gupta Empire (India)
- Thermantia, Roman empress
- Tufa Rutan, Chinese prince of the Southern Liang (b. 365)

416

- Huiyuan, Buddhist teacher and founder of the Donglin Temple (b. 334)
- Lü Long, last emperor of the Chinese Di state Later Liang
- Yao Xing, emperor of the Qiang state Later Qin (b. 366)

417

- March 12 – Pope Innocent I
- Li Gao, Chinese general of the state Western Liang (b. 351)
- Yao Hong, last emperor of the Qiang state Later Qin (b. 388)

418

- December 26 – Pope Zosimus
- Attaces, king of the Alans
- Wallia, king of the Visigoths

419

- Jin Andi, emperor of the Eastern Jin Dynasty (b. 382)
