= Gothic War in Spain (416–418) =

Western Roman Empire conducted by Visigoths

Gothic war in Spain
- Part of the Fall of the Roman Empire; Gothic Wars and Roman–Germanic Wars
- Map of the Spanish provinces
Date	416–418
Location	Spain
Result	Roman victory

Belligerents
Western Roman Empire; Visigoths	Alans; Silingi

Commanders and leaders
Constantius III; Wallia	Attaces; Respendial; Fredebal

The Gothic War in Spain was a military operation of the Visigoths commissioned by the West Roman Empire. This operation consisted of multiple campaigns that took place between 416 and 418 and were directed against the Vandals and the Alans to restore Roman power in the Spanish provinces of Betica, Lusitania and Cartaginense. As far as is known, the Roman field army was not involved in the battles, only foederati units fought on the side of the Romans. According to Thompson the Hasdingi in Gallaecia played a dubious role in this war.

== Sources ==
The history of this war is briefly handed down, the main source is Hydatius (400-469), bishop of Chaves. Without his Chronicles, no history of Spain would have been known in the 5th century. Another contemporary is Orosius (375-420). Furthermore, Sidonius Apollinaris (430-486), the nameless Gallic Chronicle of 452, and Isidore of Seville (560-636) are useful sources. Also prominent historians such as E.A. Thompson and B.P. Bachrach have written the necessary about the period.

The broad outlines of the events are known. After three years of warfare, the Visigoths knocked down Romes' enemies in Spain and almost destroyed them. Fredebal, the king of the Silingen was captured and Attaces, the Alan king in Lusitania, was killed. Gunderic, the Vandal Hasdingi king in Gallaecia, was lucky, because they were not attacked by the Visigoths. Unfortunately, the reason for this has not been reported and the answer to it has been provided by later historians. According to Thompson, Gunderic was accepted by the emperor as an ally and it was his troops who dealt a heavy blow to the Alans in Carthaginensis. At that moment Constantius thought it was enough and intervened, he forced the Visigoths to stop their campaign and they had to leave Spain.

== Background ==
=== The barbarian invasion ===
Reconstruction of the 407–409 sack of Gaul, based on Peter Heather (2005)

On 31 December 405/406, a coalition of barbaric peoples (Alanen, Hasdingi and Silingi Vandals, and Suebi) broke through the Roman border defence on the Rhine and invaded Gaul, which event is known as the Rhine Crossing. In their wake, a trail of destruction arose. Shortly thereafter, the rebellious British army under the leadership of Constantine III crossed the Channel. With a mixture of fighting and diplomacy, the British usurper stabilized the situation and established his control over Gaul and Hispania (modern Spain and Portugal). In addition, he had little to fear from the imperial field army that had been partly withdrawn because of the War of Radagaisus or went over to him.

Constantine managed to reach an agreement with the Alans and Vandals, which allowed him to establish his authority, while the Alans and Vandals in turn could secure their own interests. He also managed to persuade a part of the Alans led by King Goar to fight by his side. From those barbarians, Constantine created a regiment called the Honorians. which he gave the task of guarding the mountain passes in the Pyrenees. In 409 Constantine's general Gerontius revolted against him in Spain and the Alans regiments were withdrawn from the Pyrenees, allowing the Alans and Vandals to enter the Iberian peninsula without problems.

=== The arrival of the barbarians in Spain ===
In October 409, the Vandal, Alanian and Suevian tribes arrived in Spain, where they plunder. The Romans could do little to do with this. Most of Constantine's army units were in the province of Tarragona where they were deployed in the war against the rebellious general Gerontius.

The Spanish-Romans, like their fellow citizens in Gaul, seem to have made no effort to fight with the invaders; they rather joined the fortified cities, villages and castra in the hope that the Alans and the Vandals would move on. The intruders who were nomads in their neighborhood do not seem to have made any attempts to take the fortified places. The inhabitants, although they could only venture into the countryside with some risk, found the fields depleted of food. In some areas famine arose, contemporaries report that it was not uncommon for a mother to eat her own children.

=== The division of Spain ===
In 411, Gerontius, taking his entire armed forces, left Spain to fight Constantine. The newcomers filled this power vacuum and decided to take possession of the land and divide it among themselves. The Alans were the most important group and owned the provinces Lusitania and Tarraconenses, the Vandal Silingi received Baetica, while the Vandal Hasdingi and the Suebi divided the smallest province Gallecia among themselves.

With the Spanish-Roman landowners, they concluded an arrangement for the distribution of the land based on hospitality, i.e. the Alans and other invaders became the guests of the Roman landowners and received a significant part of the income from their estates. In exchange for this income, guests 'protected' their hosts from robbers and looters. They also founded their own settlements. These arrangements seem to have brought peace to Spain temporarily.

Honorius' imperial army was at a distance in ItaIia, where it was bound after the war against Radagaisus to contain the Visigoths. After the fall of Rome in 410, they were in the south and were now on their way north. In addition, the army was to protect the Italian prefecture from the usurpators Constantine III, Jovinus and Heraclianus. Only after Constantius III, the commander-in-chief of Honorius' army, neutralized these threats and made peace with the Visigoths in 415, did the Romans gather the troops they could miss to be deployed the invaders. However, capacity for this remained limited, as the ongoing wars had halved the Roman army since 395.

=== The alliance with the Visigoths ===
The Western Roman Empire had been at war with the Visigoths since 410, albeit there were periods of cooperation. It simply had too few men to defeat the Visigoths, but on the contrary, the Visigothic soldiers were also indispensable in the defense of the empire against its enemies.

In 414, Athaulf, King of the Visigoths, married Galla Placidia, the daughter of Emperor Theodosius (379-395). After the conclusion of this marriage, relations with the Romans were again disrupted by Honorius' general Constantius (who would later become Emperor Constantius III), and who had proceeded to block the Mediterranean ports of Gaul. In response to this, Athaulf proclaimed Priscus Attalus as emperor in Bordeaux in 414. But Constantius' sea blockade was successful and in 415 Athaulf exchanged South-France for Northern-Spain. Attalus fled, fell into the hands of Constantius and was exiled to the island of Lipari.

Ataulf crossed the Pyrenees and installed his court in Barcino (present-day Barcelona) in the Tarraconence. Nevertheless, the arrival to Spain was peaceful, Athaulf did not met opposition. Not confirmed by source material, it seems that Athaulf and Constantius came to an agreement. The peaceful entry into Barcelona, as well as the arrest of Attalus, seem to reflect this, apparently based on the Visigoths' desire for peaceful coexistence with the Romans and that of the Roman Empire to use the power of the Goths to fight the other tribes that had migrated to the interior of Spain years earlier.

== The war in Spain ==
After dividing Spain among themselves, the Alans and Vandals hoped to receive the status of foederati from the Romans and addressed a request to Emperor Honorius. In exchange for peace, they offered to fight for the empire as allies, and to show their good will they were willing to give hostages. However, on the advice of his chief adviser, the commander-in-chief of the army Constantius, the emperor rejected this request, with the exception of the Hasdingi. Honorius chose to subjugate the barbarians in Spain, by applying divide and rule, he wanted to weaken them. To realize this plan, the Visigoths, with whom he had recently concluded a new peace treaty, were his main trump card.

=== The position of the Hasdingi in the war ===
In Spain, the Alans were divided into two main groups: a group led by Respendial was located in Cartaginensis and a group under the leadership of Attaces in Lusitania. The Vandals were also divided into two groups; in Silingi and Hasdingi, albeit with this difference that they had been known for much longer (from the 2nd century) as separate tribal associations. The Silings were located in the southern province of Baetica and the Hasdingi in northern Gallaecia.

In Honorius' attack plan to restore Roman authority in the Spanish provinces, the Hasdingi were given a special task to fulfill. He did not charge the reconquest of the province of Cartaginensis on the Visigoths but ordered the Hasdingi to do so. Even before the Visigoths took action, the Hasdingi under the leadership of king Gunderic went up against the Alans of Respendial and defeated them in a battle that presumably took place near the cities of Toletum and Consabura. The conquered had to place themselves under Gunderics' authority and leave Cartaginensis.

=== The Visigoths' campaign ===
In the middle of the year 416, the Visigothic army left Barcino (Barcelona) and began its campaign against the Silingi. They harboured a special resentment against this people, because the Silingi had benefited from the food shortage among the Visigoths in previous years and had sold their wheat at exorbitant prices. It is unknown how big the army of the Visigoths was, but it will probably have been around 10,000. Except for Wallia, no names of the Roman command have been handed down, this could indicate that Wallia itself held the supreme command. The campaign led them along the coast towards the province of Baetica, which the Silingi had appropriated. The sources do not mention how the journey took, it is suspected that the Visigoths were transported by sea in ships of the Imperial Navy.

In the south of Baetica the Visigoths went ashore and soon attacked the Silingi. After a series of short battles that usually ended indecided Wallia managed to capture their king Fredebal by means of a list. A decisive battle between the two armies took place near 'western Calpe' (Carteia) where the Visigoths inflicted a destructive defeat to the Silingi. The surviving Silingis fled north with their families, where they sought refuge at the Hasdingi.

The next target of the Visigoths were the Alans of Attaces. The Visigoths advanced north and entered their territory. At Mérida the capital of Lusitania, they were met by the Alan army with King Attacus at the head. In the battle that took place near the city, the Alan army was defeated and their king was killed in the battle. Just like the other group of Alans and the Silingi had done, the survivors chose to flee to the territory of Hasdingi to join them, and without appointing a new leader.

=== End of the war ===
Restoration of the Western Roman Empire in 418 after the war of the Visigoths against the barbarians in Spain.

The Goths only stopped fighting when they were ordered to do so by Constantius. His reasons for this have led to a lot of speculation. Most of these speculations have tried to explain Constantius' action by referring to the state of affairs in Gaul. In addition, many historians are dominated by the belief that the imperial authorities apparently had no objection to the presence of the barbarians as long as the Roman administrative structure was maintained, and the latter had now been met. The Goths had stripped Baetica and Lusitania of their Vandal and Alan inhabitants.

Now that the goal of the war was reached, after the defeat of the Alans in 418, Constantius ordered the Goths to stop the campaign and go to Gaul where they were given a settlement area in the province Aquitania. This meant that no war was waged against the barbarians who stayed in Gallaecia. The empire continued its alliance agreement with the Hasdingi, while the Suebi were finally also left alone.

When the "enemies" were subdued, Guntharic dominated all the remaining Vandals and Alans in Spain.

With this outcome of the war, the Roman Emperor Honorius had managed to recover his provinces disembedded in 407 and to restore the imperial government in them. For the year 420 there is evidence of the existence of a governor for Hispania and it again had its own field army. Nevertheless, the peace was short-lived, the Vandal king Gunderic already considered his military strength strong enough within two years after the war to expand his territory at the expense of the Suebi. In 421 his army left mountainous Gallaecia and moved south, where they captured Baetica and defeated the Roman field army.

== Primary sources ==
- Orosius
- Zosimus, Greek history writer, "Historia Nova"
- Sozomenus
- Prosper
- Marcellinus
- Chronica Gallica of 452
- Olympiodorus of Thebes, Histories (only a summary of this work from the 10th century by Photios I of Constantinople)

== Bibliography ==
- Bachrach, Bernard S. (1973). A History of the Alans in the West. University of Minnesota Press. ISBN 0-8166-0678-1.
- Heather, Peter (2005). La caída del Imperio romano. Oxford University Press. ISBN 9788484326922.
- Kulikowski, Michael (1998). The End of Roman Spain (PhD thesis). University of Toronto. ISBN 9780612339071.
- Livermore, H.B. (1996). "Honorio y la restauración de las Hispanias". Boletín de la Real Academia de la Historia (in Spanish). 193 (3): 443–502.
- Schreiber, H. (1979). The Goths, Princes and Vassals. Amsterdam-Brussels: H-Meulenhof.
- Thompson, E.A. (1982). Romans and Barbarians: The Decline of the Western Empire. The University of Wisconsin Press. ISBN 029908700X.
