= 415 =

415 in various calendars
- Gregorian calendar: 415; CDXV
- Ab urbe condita: 1168
- Assyrian calendar: 5165
- Balinese saka calendar: 336–337
- Bengali calendar: −179 – −178
- Berber calendar: 1365
- Buddhist calendar: 959
- Burmese calendar: −223
- Byzantine calendar: 5923–5924
- Chinese calendar: 甲寅年 (Wood Tiger); 3112 or 2905 — to — 乙卯年 (Wood Rabbit); 3113 or 2906
- Coptic calendar: 131–132
- Discordian calendar: 1581
- Ethiopian calendar: 407–408
- Hebrew calendar: 4175–4176
- Hindu calendars
- Vikram Samvat: 471–472
- Shaka Samvat: 336–337
- Kali Yuga: 3515–3516
- Holocene calendar: 10415
- Iranian calendar: 207 BP – 206 BP
- Islamic calendar: 213 BH – 212 BH
- Javanese calendar: 299–300
- Julian calendar: 415; CDXV
- Korean calendar: 2748
- Minguo calendar: 1497 before ROC 民前1497年
- Nanakshahi calendar: −1053
- Seleucid era: 726/727 AG
- Thai solar calendar: 957–958
- Tibetan calendar: ཤིང་ཕོ་སྟག་ལོ་ (male Wood-Tiger); 541 or 160 or −612 — to — ཤིང་མོ་ཡོས་ལོ་ (female Wood-Hare); 542 or 161 or −611

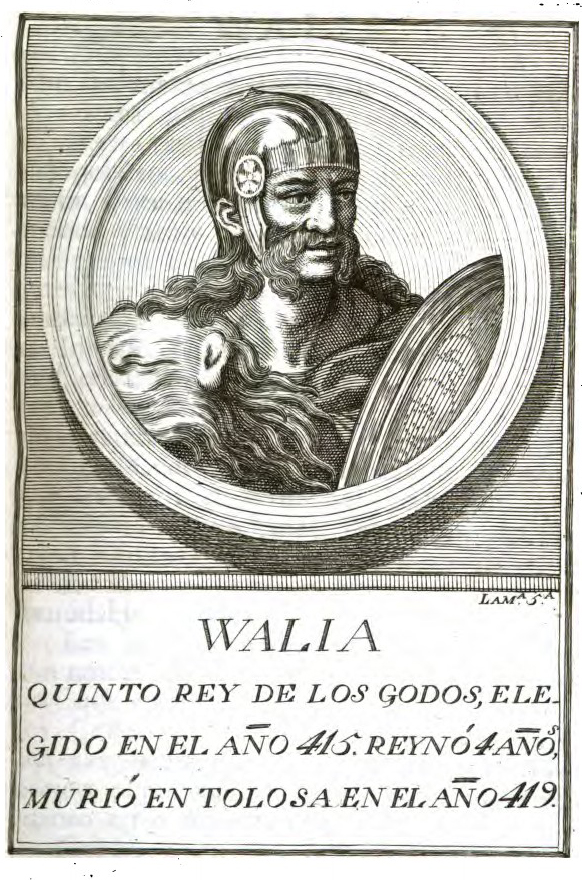
King Wallia of the Visigoths

Year 415 (CDXV) was a common year starting on Friday of the Julian calendar. At the time, it was known as the Year of the Consulship of Honorius and Theodosius (or, less frequently, year 1168 Ab urbe condita). The denomination 415 for this year has been used since the early medieval period, when the Anno Domini calendar era became the prevalent method in Europe for naming years.

== Events ==
=== By place ===
==== Roman Empire ====
- Roman Civil war of 407–415:
  - Constantius, Roman general (magister militum), drives the Visigoths out of Gaul. He captures the usurper Priscus Attalus, and sends him under military escort to Ravenna.
  - The Visigoths invade the Iberian Peninsula and begin to conquer territory taken previously by the Vandals. King Athaulf and his pregnant wife Galla Placidia leave Gallia Narbonensis; they relocate at Barcelona. Their infant son, Theodosius, dies in infancy, eliminating an opportunity for a Roman-Visigothic line. Athaulf is assassinated in the palace while taking a bath. Sigeric succeeds him, but after a reign of seven days he is also murdered.
  - Autumn – Wallia, brother of Athaulf, becomes king of the Visigoths. He accepts a peace treaty with emperor Honorius, in return for a supply of 600,000 measures of grain. After the negotiations he sends Placidia to Rome with hostages.

==== Asia ====
- March 18 – The Daysan River floods Edessa, Mesopotamia.

=== By topic ===
==== Religion ====
- March – Hypatia of Alexandria, Neoplatonist philosopher, is murdered by a Christian mob of Nitrian monks at the church (former temple conceived by Cleopatra VII) called Caesareum. Having driven out the Jews, Alexandria's new patriarch, Cyril, has instigated the mob after taking offense at Hypatia's scientific rationalism (approximate date).
- John Cassian, Christian theologian, settles at a monastery in Marseille (Gaul); he organizes monastic communities after an eastern model.
- The Eustathian schism in Antioch is healed (approximate date).

== Deaths ==
- March – Hypatia of Alexandria, female Neoplatonist philosopher and mathematician, murdered in Egypt
- August 15 – Athaulf, king of the Visigoths, assassinated
- August 22 – Sigeric, king of the Visigoths, assassinated
- Chandragupta II, emperor of the Gupta Empire (India) (probable date)
- Thermantia, Roman empress consort
- Tufa Rutan, deposed Chinese prince of the Southern Liang, poisoned (b. 365)
