= Zosima =

Zosima may refer to:

- Zosima (plant), a genus of flowering plants belonging to the family Apiaceae
- Zosimas of Palestine, a saint

See also:

- Zosimus
