= Fredebal =

Fredebal, also spelled as Fredbal or Fredbalus, was a king of the Vandals during the 5th century.

King of the Siling Vandals, he was taken prisoner without any conflict in Baetica (416) by a trick of Wallia, king of the Visigoths, in the Gothic war in Spain. Fredebal was sent to Roman Emperor Honorius in Ravenna.

== Sources ==
- Hydatius
- Chronicle of Fredegar
