= Segeric =

Visigothic king

Segeric was, according to Jordanes, the king who immediately followed Alaric I as ruler of the Visigoths. He ruled only a short time between the death of Alaric (c. late 410) before being killed by his soldiers (at some point in early 411), who acclaimed Alaric's brother Ataulf as the new Visigothic King.

King Segeric of the Visigoths Balti dynasty Born: Unknown Died: 411
Regnal titles
Preceded by Alaric I	King of the Visigoths; Late 410 – Early 411	Succeeded by Ataulf
