= Alaric I =

King of the Visigoths from 395 to 410

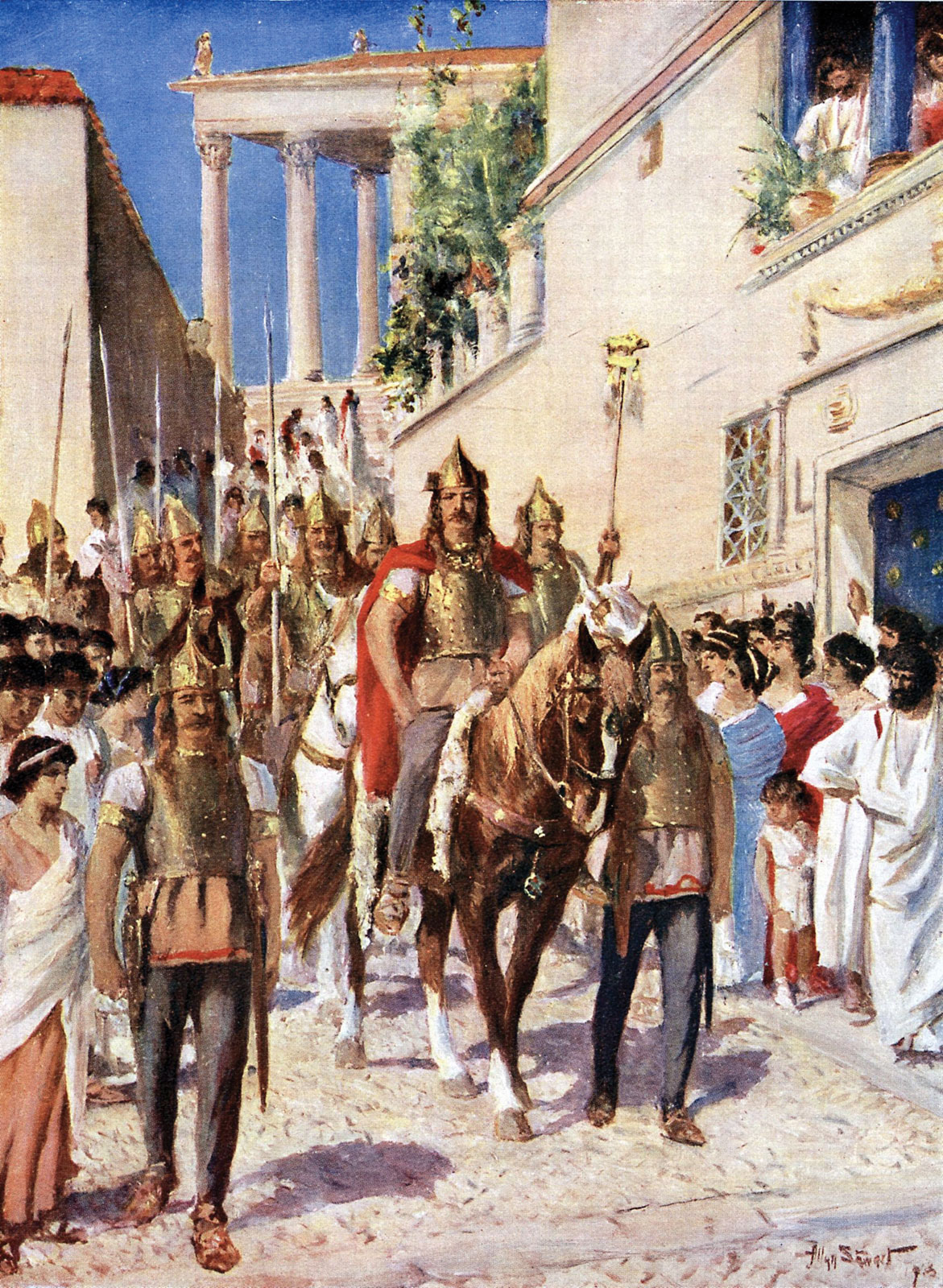
- A 20th-century depiction of Alaric parading through Athens after conquering the city in 395

King of the Visigoths
- Reign: 395–410
- Coronation: 395
- Predecessor: Athanaric
- Successor: Segeric
- Born: c. 370; Peuce Island, Danube Delta
- Died: 411; Consentia, Italia, Roman Empire
- Burial: Busento River, Calabria, Italy
- Dynasty: Balt
- Father: Unknown
- Religion: Arianism

Alaric I (/ˈælərɪk/; reconstructed Gothic: *𐌰𐌻𐌰𐍂𐌴𐌹𐌺𐍃, *Alarīks lit.'ruler of all'; Latin: Alaricus; c. 370 – 411 AD) was the first king of the Visigoths, from 395 to 410. He rose to leadership of the Goths who came to occupy Moesia—territory acquired a couple of decades earlier by a combined force of Goths and Alans after the Battle of Adrianople.

Alaric began his career under the Gothic soldier Gainas and later joined the Roman army. Once an ally of Rome under the Roman emperor Theodosius, Alaric helped defeat the Franks and other allies of a would-be Roman usurper. Despite losing many thousands of his men, he received little recognition from Rome and left the Roman army disappointed. After the death of Theodosius and the disintegration of the Roman armies in 395, he is described as king of the Visigoths. As the leader of the only effective field force remaining in the Balkans, he sought Roman legitimacy, never quite achieving a position acceptable to himself or to the Roman authorities.

He operated mainly against the successive Western Roman regimes, and marched into Italy, where he died. He is responsible for the sack of Rome in 410, one of several notable events in the Western Roman Empire's eventual decline.

== Early life, federate status in the Balkans ==
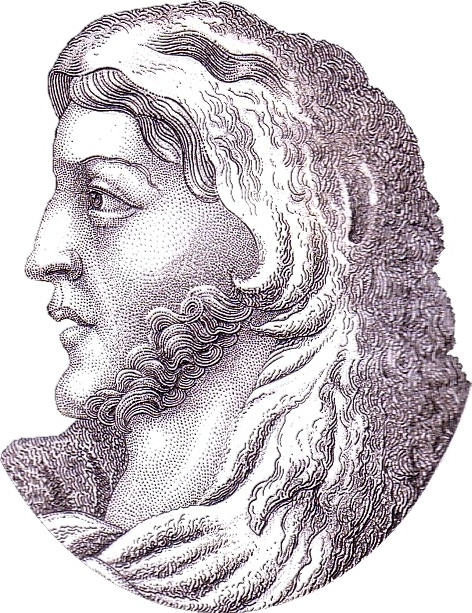
Imaginative portrait of Alaric in C. Strahlheim, Das Welttheater, 4. Band, Frankfurt a.M., 1836

According to Jordanes, a 6th-century Roman writer of Gothic origin, Alaric was born on Peuce Island in the Danube Delta in present-day Romania and belonged to the noble Balti dynasty of the Thervingian Goths. There is no way to verify this claim. (Note: To a large extent, Alaric's kin were largely Thervingi, with whom Constantine had concluded a lasting peace in the 330s.) Historian Douglas Boin does not make such an unequivocal assessment about Alaric's Gothic heritage and instead claims he came from either the Thervingi or the Greuthung tribes. When the Goths suffered setbacks against the Huns, they made a mass migration across the Danube, and fought a war with Rome. Alaric was probably a child during this period who grew up along Rome's periphery. Alaric's upbringing was shaped by living along the border of Roman territory in a region that the Romans viewed as a veritable "backwater"; some four centuries before, the Roman poet Ovid regarded the area along the Danube and Black Sea where Alaric was reared as a land of "barbarians", among "the most remote in the vast world." (Note: Ovid never singled out any particular barbarian group and at the time of his writings, was referencing the ethnic Sarmatians, Getae, Dacians and Thracians.)

Alaric's childhood in the Balkans, where the Goths had settled by way of an agreement with Emperor Theodosius, was spent in the company of veterans who had fought at the Battle of Adrianople in 378, (Note: Many of Rome's leading officers and some of their most elite fighting men died during the battle which struck a major blow to Roman prestige and the Empire's military capabilities.) during which they had annihilated much of the Eastern army and killed Emperor Valens. Imperial campaigns against the Visigoths were conducted until a treaty was reached in 382. This treaty was the first foedus on imperial Roman soil and required these semi-autonomous Germanic tribes—among whom Alaric was raised—to supply troops for the Roman army in exchange for peace, control of cultivatable land, and freedom from Roman direct administrative control. Correspondingly, there was hardly a region along the Roman frontier during Alaric's day without Gothic slaves and servants of one form or another. For several subsequent decades, many Goths like Alaric were "called up into regular units of the eastern field army" while others served as auxiliaries in campaigns led by Theodosius against the western usurpers Magnus Maximus and Eugenius.

== Rebellion against Rome, rise to Gothic leadership ==
A new phase in the relationship between the Goths and the empire resulted from the treaty signed in 382, as more and more Goths attained aristocratic rank from their service in the imperial army. Alaric began his military career under the Gothic soldier Gainas, and later joined the Roman army. (Note: Alaric had a fascination for the 'golden age' of Rome and insisted on his tribesmen calling him 'Alaricus'.) He first appeared as leader of a mixed band of Goths and allied peoples, who invaded Thrace in 391 but were stopped by the half-Vandal, Roman general Stilicho. (Note: Flavius Stilicho, the Western Roman Empire's magister militum and regent for Emperor Honorius, was of mixed heritage—his father was a Vandal who served as a cavalry officer in the Roman army, and his mother was Roman.) While the Roman poet Claudian belittled Alaric as "a little-known menace" terrorizing southern Thrace during this time, Alaric's abilities and forces were formidable enough to prevent the Roman Emperor Theodosius from crossing the Hebrus River.

== Service under Theodosius I ==
By 392, Alaric had entered Roman military service, which coincided with a reduction of hostilities between Goths and Romans. In 394, he led a Gothic force that helped Emperor Theodosius defeat the Frankish usurper Arbogast—fighting at the behest of Eugenius—at the Battle of Frigidus. Despite sacrificing around 10,000 of his men, who had been victims of Theodosius' callous tactical decision to overwhelm the enemies' front lines using Gothic foederati, Alaric received little recognition from the emperor. Alaric was among the few who survived the protracted and bloody affair. Many Romans considered it their "gain" and a victory that so many Goths had died during the Battle of Frigidus River. Alaric biographer Douglas Boin (2020) posited that seeing ten thousand of his (Alaric's) dead kinsmen likely elicited questions about what kind of ruler Theodosius actually had been and whether remaining in direct Roman service was best for men like him. Refused the reward he expected, which included a promotion to the position of magister militum and command of regular Roman units, Alaric mutinied and began to march against Constantinople.

On 17 January 395, Theodosius died of an illness, leaving his two young and incapable sons Arcadius and Honorius in Stilicho's guardianship. Modern writers regard Alaric as king of the Visigoths from 395. According to historian Peter Heather, it is not entirely clear in the sources if Alaric rose to prominence at the time the Goths revolted following Theodosius's death, or if he had already risen within his tribe as early as the war against Eugenius. (Note: Heather surmises that Alaric's participation in the earlier revolt that followed Maximus' defeat and his "command of Gothic troops on the Eugenius campaign suggest...a noble steadily advancing his prestige among the Goths settled in the Balkans by Theodosius." The sources do not make it clear whether Alaric's "desire for a generalship" was a means to legitimize himself "further within a Gothic following," or whether he was simply an ambitious man, who was at heart, "essentially a Roman soldier." Kulikowski adds that trying to determine either "depends upon our own previous assumptions, not upon the evidence.") Whatever the circumstances, Jordanes recorded that the new king persuaded his people to "seek a kingdom by their own exertions rather than serve others in idleness."

== Semi-independent action in Eastern Roman interests, Eastern Roman recognition ==
Whether or not Alaric was a member of an ancient Germanic royal clan—as claimed by Jordanes and debated by historians—is less important than his emergence as a leader, the first of his kind since Fritigern. Theodosius's death left the Roman field armies collapsing and the Empire divided again between his two sons, one taking the eastern and the other the western portion of the Empire. Stilicho made himself master of the West and attempted to establish control in the East as well, and led an army into Greece. Alaric rebelled again. Historian Roger Collins points out that while the rivalries created by the two halves of the Empire vying for power worked to Alaric's advantage and that of his people, simply being called to authority by the Gothic people did not solve the practicalities of their needs for survival. He needed Roman authority in order to be supplied by Roman cities.

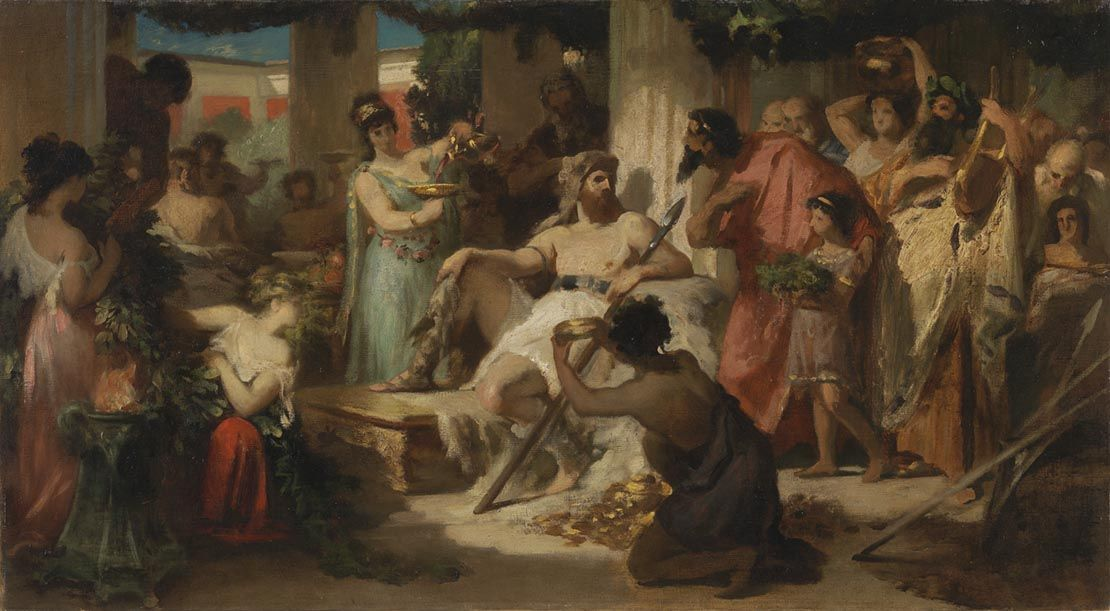
Alaric (central figure, bearded) rests after capturing Athens, as imagined by Ludwig Thiersch in 1879

Alaric took his Gothic army on what Stilicho's propagandist Claudian described as a "pillaging campaign" that began first in the East. Historian Thomas Burns's interpretation is that Alaric and his men were recruited by Rufinus's Eastern regime in Constantinople, and sent to Thessaly to stave off Stilicho's threat. No battle took place. Alaric's forces made their way down to Athens and along the coast, where he sought to force a new peace upon the Romans. In 396, he marched through Thermopylae and sacked Athens, where archaeological evidence shows widespread damage to the city. Stilicho's propagandist Claudian accuses his troops of plundering for the next year or so as far south as the mountainous Peloponnese peninsula, and reports that only Stilicho's surprise attack with his western field army (having sailed from Italy) stemmed the plundering as he pushed Alaric's forces north into Epirus. Zosimus adds that Stilicho's troops destroyed and pillaged too, and let Alaric's men escape with their plunder. (Note: See: Zosimus, book 5 http://en.wikisource.org/wiki/New_History/Book_the_Fifth)

Stilicho was forced to send some of his Eastern forces home. They went to Constantinople under the command of one Gainas, a Goth with a large Gothic following. On arrival, Gainas murdered Rufinus, and was appointed magister militum for Thrace by Eutropius, the new supreme minister and the only eunuch consul of Rome, who, Zosimus claims, controlled Arcadius "as if he were a sheep". (Note: See: Zosimus, book 5 http://en.wikisource.org/wiki/New_History/Book_the_Fifth) A poem by Synesius advises Arcadius to display manliness and remove a "skin-clad savage" (probably referring to Alaric) from the councils of power and his barbarians from the Roman army. We do not know if Arcadius ever became aware of this advice, but it had no recorded effect.

Stilicho obtained a few more troops from the German frontier and continued to campaign indecisively against the Eastern empire; again he was opposed by Alaric and his men. During the next year, 397, Eutropius personally led his troops to victory over some Huns who were marauding in Asia Minor. With his position thus strengthened he declared Stilicho a public enemy, (Note: Despite his Vandal ancestry, Stilicho was thoroughly Romanized, adhering to Nicene Christianity and integrating into the Roman elite through his marriage to Serena, the niece of Emperor Theodosius I. Stilicho's heritage became a focal point in the political machinations of the time, especially during his dealings with Alaric. While Stilicho sought to manage Alaric through a combination of military action and diplomatic engagement, his opponents at court leveraged his non-Roman background to question his loyalty and motives. This skepticism was exacerbated by Stilicho's policy of employing barbarian federates, including Goths, within the Roman military structure—a practice that, while pragmatic, fueled fears of barbarian influence over imperial affairs.) and he established Alaric as magister militum per Illyricum Alaric thus acquired entitlement to gold and grain for his followers and negotiations were underway for a more permanent settlement. Stilicho's supporters in Milan were outraged at this seeming betrayal; meanwhile, Eutropius was celebrated in 398 by a parade through Constantinople for having achieved victory over the "wolves of the North". (Note: This victory celebration included recognizing Eutropius's part in allowing Roman troops to be reinforced by Goths, who jointly ejected the Huns from nearby Armenia.) Alaric's people were relatively quiet for the next couple of years. In 399, Eutropius fell from power. The new Eastern regime now felt that they could dispense with Alaric's services and they nominally transferred Alaric's province to the West. This administrative change removed Alaric's Roman rank and his entitlement to legal provisioning for his men, leaving his army—the only significant force in the ravaged Balkans—as a problem for Stilicho.

== In search of Western Roman recognition; invading Italy ==
=== First invasion of Italy (c. 401–403) ===
According to historian Michael Kulikowski, sometime in the spring of 402 Alaric decided to invade Italy, but no sources from antiquity indicate to what purpose. (Note: Some lines from the Roman poet Claudian inform us that he heard a voice proceeding from a sacred grove, "Away with delay, Alaric; boldly cross the Italian Alps this year and thou shalt reach the city.") Burns suggests that Alaric was probably desperate for provisions. Using Claudian as his source, historian Guy Halsall reports that Alaric's attack actually began in late 401, but since Stilicho was in Raetia "dealing with frontier issues" the two did not first confront one another in Italy until 402. Alaric's entry into Italy followed the route identified in the poetry of Claudian, as he crossed the peninsula's Alpine frontier near the city of Aquileia. For a period of six to nine months, there were reports of Gothic attacks along the northern Italian roads, where Alaric was spotted by Roman townspeople. Along the route on Via Postumia, Alaric first encountered Stilicho.

Two battles were fought. The first was at Pollentia on Easter Sunday, where Stilicho (according to Claudian) achieved an impressive victory, taking Alaric's wife and children prisoner, and more significantly, seizing much of the treasure that Alaric had amassed over the previous five years' worth of plundering. (Note: Stilicho's enemies later reproached him for not having finished off the enemy by slaying them in their entirety.) Pursuing the retreating forces of Alaric, Stilicho offered to return the prisoners but was refused. The second battle was at Verona, where Alaric was defeated for a second time. Stilicho once again offered Alaric a truce and allowed him to withdraw from Italy. Kulikowski explains this confusing, if not outright conciliatory behavior by stating, "given Stilicho's cold war with Constantinople, it would have been foolish to destroy as biddable and violent a potential weapon as Alaric might well prove to be". Halsall's observations are similar, as he contends that the Roman general's "decision to permit Alaric's withdrawal into Pannonia makes sense if we see Alaric's force entering Stilicho's service, and Stilicho's victory being less total than Claudian would have us believe". Perhaps more revealing is a report from the Greek historian Zosimus—writing a half a century later—that indicates an agreement was concluded between Stilicho and Alaric in 405, which suggests Alaric being in "western service at that point", likely stemming from arrangements made back in 402. (Note: While Alaric had not penetrated into the city, his invasion of Italy still produced important results. It caused the imperial residence to be transferred from Milan to Ravenna, and necessitated the withdrawal of Legio XX Valeria Victrix from Britain.) Between 404 and 405, Alaric remained in one of the four Pannonian provinces, from where he could "play East off against West while potentially threatening both".

Historian A.D. Lee observes, "Alaric's return to the north-west Balkans brought only temporary respite to Italy, for in 405 another substantial body of Goths and other barbarians, this time from outside the empire, crossed the middle Danube and advanced into northern Italy, where they plundered the countryside and besieged cities and towns" under their leader Radagaisus. Although the imperial government was struggling to muster enough troops to contain these barbarian invasions, Stilicho managed to stifle the threat posed by the tribes under Radagaisus, when the latter split his forces into three separate groups. Stilicho cornered Radagaisus near Florence and starved the invaders into submission. (Note: Historian Walter Goffart points out that while many sources identify Radagaisus as an Ostrogoth, he and his forces were likely composed of "odds and ends of peoples who crossed into the empire" and that their documented numbers have been inflated.) Meanwhile, Alaric—bestowed with codicils of magister militum by Stilicho and now supplied by the West—awaited for one side or the other to incite him to action as Stilicho faced further difficulties from more barbarians.

=== Second invasion of Italy, agreement with Western Roman regime ===
Sometime in 406 and into 407, more large groups of barbarians, consisting primarily of Vandals, Sueves and Alans, crossed the Rhine into Gaul while about the same time a rebellion occurred in Britain. Under a common soldier named Constantine it spread to Gaul. Burdened by so many enemies, Stilicho's position was strained. During this crisis in 407, Alaric again marched on Italy, taking a position in Noricum (modern Austria), where he demanded a sum of 4,000 pounds of gold to buy off another full-scale invasion. The Roman Senate loathed the idea of supporting Alaric; Zosimus observed that one senator famously declaimed Non est ista pax, sed pactio servitutis ("This is not peace, but a pact of servitude"). (Note: See: Zosimus, Nova Historia, book 5. http://www.tertullian.org/fathers/zosimus05_book5.htm) Stilicho paid Alaric the 4,000 pounds of gold nevertheless. This agreement, sensible in view of the military situation, fatally weakened Stilicho's standing at Honorius's court. Twice Stilicho had allowed Alaric to escape his grasp, and Radagaisus had advanced all the way to the outskirts of Florence.

=== Renewed hostilities after Western Roman coup ===
In the East, Arcadius died on 1 May 408 and was replaced by his son Theodosius II; Stilicho seems to have planned to march to Constantinople, and to install there a regime loyal to himself. He may also have intended to give Alaric a senior official position and send him against the rebels in Gaul. Before Stilicho could do so, while he was away at Ticinum at the head of a small detachment, a bloody coup against his supporters took place at Honorius's court. It was led by Honorius's minister, Olympius. Stilicho's small escort of Goths and Huns was commanded by a Goth, Sarus, whose Gothic troops massacred the Hun contingent in their sleep, and then withdrew towards the cities in which their own families were billeted. Stilicho ordered that Sarus's Goths should not be admitted, but, now without an army, he was forced to flee for sanctuary. Agents of Olympius promised Stilicho his life, but instead betrayed and killed him. (Note: Despite skillful maneuvering against the Goths, historian J. M. Wallace-Hadrill explains that Stilicho could not endear himself to the Romans, even though he had rescued Rome on two occasions before it fell to Alaric. Stilicho's dual rescue of Rome notwithstanding, he remained, in Wallace-Hadrill's estimation, "the scapegoat of Roman writers"—condemned as "the man who sold the pass" for reasons that were as much ideological as strategic. His willingness to negotiate with the Goths in pursuit of Illyricum, his neglect of Gaul, and the fiscal burden his defense policy imposed on the senatorial class all contributed to his infamy; but it was his association with Arianism, a theology Western Catholics regarded as sacrilege, that most ignominiously marked him in Roman memory.)

Alaric was again declared an enemy of the emperor. Olympius's men then massacred the families of the federate troops (as presumed supporters of Stilicho, although they had probably rebelled against him), and the troops defected en masse to Alaric. Many thousands of barbarian auxiliaries, along with their wives and children, joined Alaric in Noricum. The conspirators seem to have let their main army disintegrate and had no policy except hunting down supporters of Stilicho. Italy was left without effective indigenous defence forces thereafter.

As a declared 'enemy of the emperor', Alaric was denied the legitimacy that he needed to collect taxes and hold cities without large garrisons, which he could not afford to detach. He again offered to move his men, this time to Pannonia, in exchange for a modest sum of money and the modest title of Comes, but he was refused because Olympius's regime regarded him as a supporter of Stilicho.

=== First siege of Rome, agreed ransom ===
When Alaric was rebuffed, he led his force of around 30,000 men—many newly enlisted and understandably motivated—on a march toward Rome to avenge their murdered families. He moved across the Julian Alps into Italy, probably using the route and supplies arranged for him by Stilicho, bypassing the imperial court in Ravenna which was protected by widespread marshland and had a port, and in September 408 he menaced the city of Rome, imposing a strict blockade. No blood was shed this time; Alaric relied on hunger as his most powerful weapon. When the ambassadors of the Senate, entreating for peace, tried to intimidate him with hints of what the despairing citizens might accomplish, he laughed and gave his celebrated answer: "The thicker the hay, the easier mowed!" After much bargaining, the famine-stricken citizens agreed to pay a ransom of 5,000 pounds of gold, 30,000 pounds of silver, 4,000 silken tunics, 3,000 hides dyed scarlet, and 3,000 pounds of pepper. Alaric also recruited some 40,000 freed Gothic slaves. Thus ended Alaric's first siege of Rome.

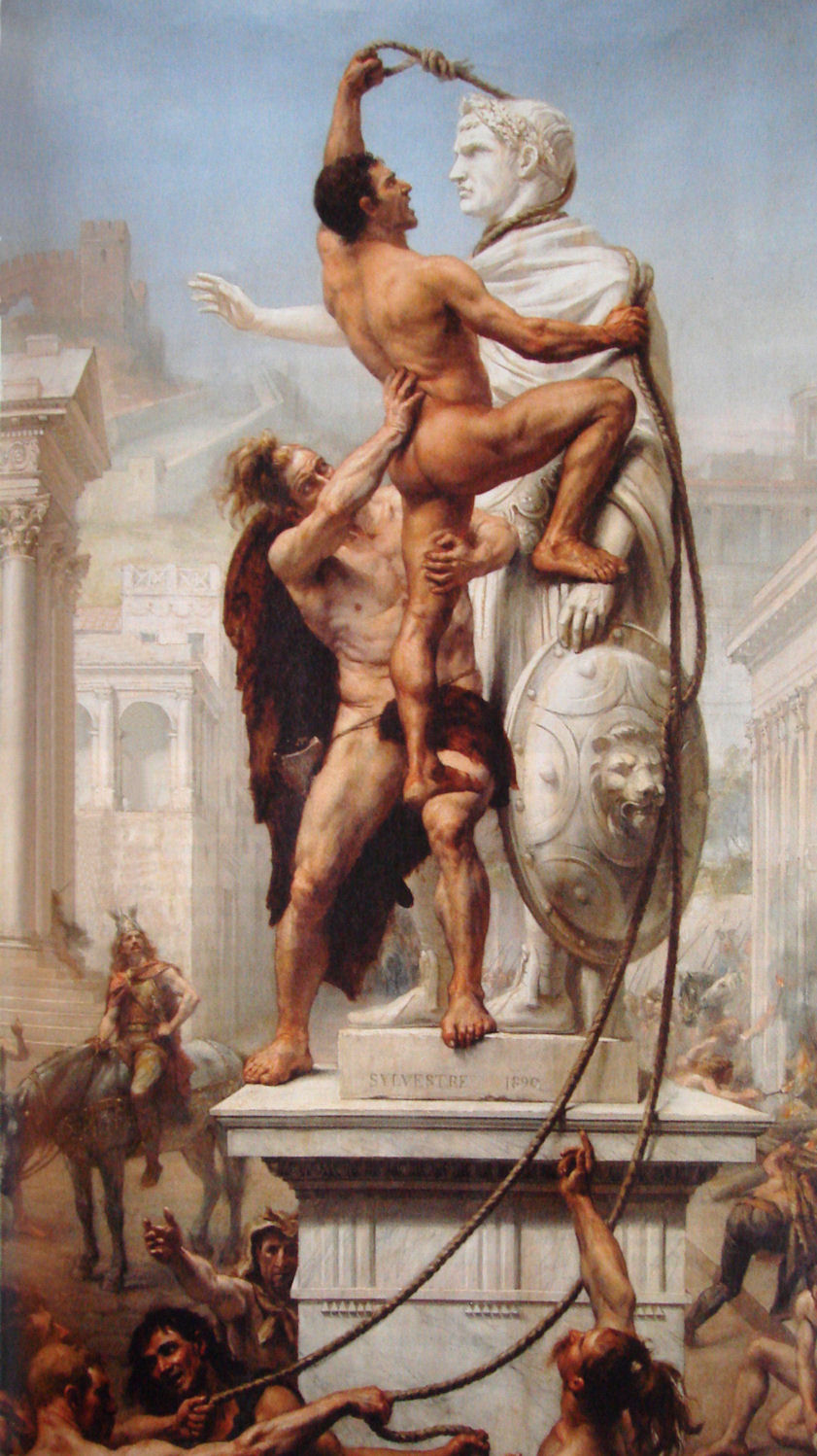
The Sack of Rome by the Visigoths on 24 August 410 by J.-N. Sylvestre (1890)

=== Failed agreement with the Western Romans, Alaric sets up his own emperor ===
After having provisionally agreed to the terms offered by Alaric for lifting the blockade, Honorius recanted; historian A.D. Lee highlights that one of the points of contention for the emperor was Alaric's expectation of being named head of the Roman Army, a post Honorius was not prepared to grant to Alaric. When this title was not bestowed onto Alaric, he proceeded to not only "besiege Rome again in late 409, but also to proclaim a leading senator, Priscus Attalus, as a rival emperor, from whom Alaric then received the appointment" he desired. Meanwhile, Alaric's newly appointed "emperor" Attalus, who seems not to have understood the limits of his power or his dependence on Alaric, failed to take Alaric's advice and lost the grain supply in Africa to a pro-Honorian comes Africae, Heraclian. Then, sometime in 409, Attalus—accompanied by Alaric—marched on Ravenna and after receiving unprecedented terms and concessions from the legitimate emperor Honorius, refused him and instead demanded that Honorius be deposed and exiled. Fearing for his safety, Honorius made preparations to flee to Ravenna when ships carrying 4,000 troops arrived from Constantinople, restoring his resolve. Now that Honorius no longer felt the need to negotiate, Alaric (regretting his choice of puppet emperor) deposed Attalus, perhaps to re-open negotiations with Ravenna.

=== Sack of Rome ===
Negotiations with Honorius might have succeeded had it not been for another intervention by Sarus, of the Amal family, and therefore a hereditary enemy of Alaric and his house. He attacked Alaric's men. Why Sarus, who had been in imperial service for years under Stilicho, acted at this moment remains a mystery, but Alaric interpreted this attack as directed by Ravenna and as bad faith from Honorius. No longer would negotiations suffice for Alaric, as his patience had reached its end, which led him to march on Rome for a third and final time.

On 24 August 410, Alaric and his forces began the sack of Rome, an assault that lasted three days. After hearing reports that Alaric had entered the city—possibly aided by Gothic slaves inside—there were reports that Emperor Honorius (safe in Ravenna) broke into "wailing and lamentation" but quickly calmed once "it was explained to him that it was the city of Rome that had met its end and not 'Roma'," his pet fowl. Writing from Bethlehem, St. Jerome (Letter 127.12, to the lady Principia) (Note: See the New Advent source here: https://www.newadvent.org/fathers/3001127.htm) lamented: "A dreadful rumour reached us from the West. We heard that Rome was besieged, that the citizens were buying their safety with gold … The city which had taken the whole world was itself taken; nay, it fell by famine before it fell to the sword." Nonetheless, Christian writers also cited how Alaric ordered that anyone who took shelter in a Church was to be spared. (Note: Evidently the piety and restraint of the barbarian soldiers under Alaric, despite their adherence to Arianism, was less pagan in the eyes of Christian writers than the practices of the Romans themselves.) When liturgical vessels were taken from the basilica of St. Peter and Alaric heard of this, he ordered them returned and had them ceremoniously restored in the church. If the account from the historian Orosius can be seen as accurate, there was even a celebratory recognition of Christian unity by way of a procession through the streets where Romans and barbarians alike "raised a hymn to God in public"; historian Edward James concludes that such stories are likely more political rhetoric of the "noble" barbarians than a reflection of historical reality.

According to historian Patrick Geary, Roman booty was not the focus of Alaric's sack of Rome; he came for needed food supplies. (Note: Geary also contends that Alaric had the long-term intention to lead his people to North Africa, much like the later Vandals would do.) Historian Stephen Mitchell asserts that Alaric's followers seemed incapable of feeding themselves and relied on provisions "supplied by the Roman authorities." Whatever Alaric's intentions were cannot be known entirely, but Kulikowski certainly sees the issue of available treasure in a different light, writing that "For three days, Alaric's Goths sacked the city, stripping it of the wealth of centuries." The barbarian invaders were not gentle in their treatment of property as substantial damage was still evident into the sixth century. Certainly the Roman world was shaken by the fall of the Eternal City to barbarian invaders, but as Guy Halsall emphasizes, "Rome's fall had less striking political effects. Alaric, unable to treat with Honorius, remained in the political cold." Kulikowski sees the situation similarly, commenting:

But for Alaric the sack of Rome was an admission of defeat, a catastrophic failure. Everything he had hoped for, had fought for over the course of a decade and a half, went up in flames with the capital of the ancient world. Imperial office, a legitimate place for himself and his followers inside the empire, these were now forever out of reach. He might seize what he wanted, as he had seized Rome, but he would never be given it by right. The sack of Rome solved nothing and when the looting was over Alaric's men still had nowhere to live and fewer future prospects than ever before.

Still, the importance of Alaric cannot be "overestimated" according to Halsall, since he had desired and obtained a Roman command even though he was a barbarian; his real misfortune was being caught between the rivalry of the Eastern and Western empires and their court intrigue. According to historian Peter Brown, when one compares Alaric with other barbarians, "he was almost an Elder Statesman." Nonetheless, Alaric's respect for Roman institutions as a former servant to its highest office did not stay his hand in violently sacking the city that had for centuries exemplified Roman glory, leaving behind physical destruction and social disruption, while Alaric took clerics and even the emperor's sister, Galla Placidia, with him when he left the city. Many other Italian communities beyond the city of Rome itself fell victim to the forces under Alaric, as Procopius (Wars 3.2.11–13) writing in the sixth century later relates:

For they destroyed all the cities which they captured, especially those south of the Ionian Gulf, so completely that nothing has been left to my time to know them by, unless, indeed, it might be one tower or gate or some such thing which chanced to remain. And they killed all the people, as many as came in their way, both old and young alike, sparing neither women nor children. Wherefore even up to the present time Italy is sparsely populated.

Whether Alaric's forces wrought the level of destruction described by Procopius or not cannot be known, but evidence speaks to a significant population decrease, as the number of people on the food dole dropped from 800,000 in 408 to 500,000 by 419. Rome's fall to the barbarians was as much a psychological blow to the empire as anything else, since some Romans citizens saw the collapse as resulting from the conversion to Christianity, while Christian theologians like St.Augustine (writing City of God) responded in turn. Lamenting Rome's capture, famed Christian theologian Jerome, wrote how "day and night" he could not stop thinking of everyone's safety, and moreover, how Alaric had extinguished "the bright light of all the world." Some contemporary Christian observers even saw Alaric—a professed Christian—as God's wrath upon a still pagan Rome.

=== Move to southern Italy, death from disease ===
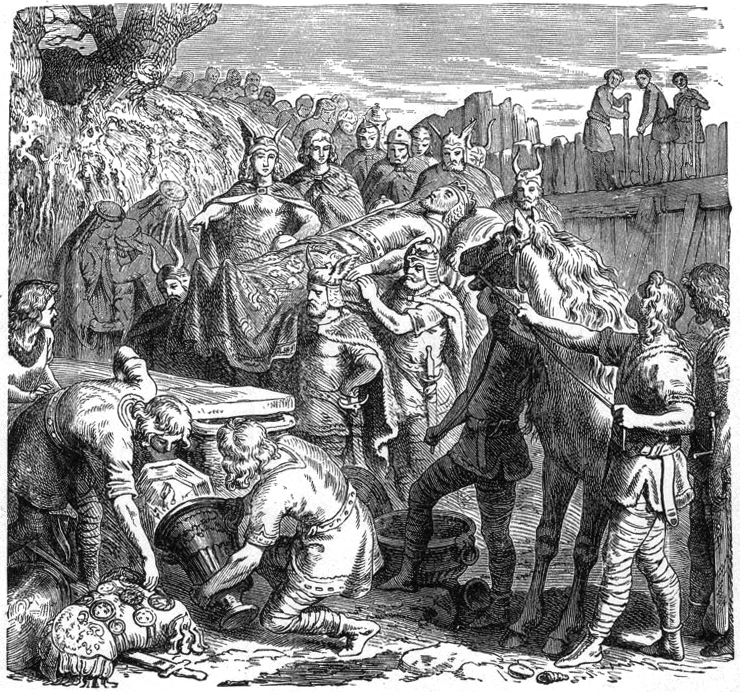
An engraving of Alaric's burial in the bed of the Busento River (1895)

Not only had Rome's sack been a significant blow to the Roman people's morale, they had also endured two years' worth of trauma brought about by fear, hunger (due to blockades), and illness. However, the Goths were not long in the city of Rome, as only three days after the sack, Alaric marched his men south to Campania, from where he intended to sail to Sicily—probably to obtain grain and other supplies—when a storm destroyed his fleet. During the early months of 411, while on his northward return journey through Italy, Alaric took ill and died at Consentia in Bruttium. His cause of death was likely fever, (Note: In 2016, Francesco Galassi and his colleagues pored over all the historical, medical and epidemiological sources they could find on Alaric's demise and concluded that the underlying cause was malaria. For further information, see: "The sudden death of Alaric I (c. 370–410 AD), the vanquisher of Rome: A tale of malaria and lacking immunity." Francesco M. Galassi, Raffaella Bianucci, Giacomo Gorini, Giacomo M. Paganottie, Michael E. Habicht, Frank J. Rühli. European Journal of Internal Medicine June 2016 Volume 31, pp. 84–87. https://www.ejinme.com/article/S0953-6205(16)00067-4/abstract) and his body was, according to legend, buried under the riverbed of the Busento in accordance with the pagan practices of the Visigothic people. The stream was temporarily turned aside from its course while the grave was dug, wherein the Gothic chief and some of his most precious spoils were interred. When the work was finished, the river was turned back into its usual channel and the captives by whose hands the labour had been accomplished were put to death that none might learn their secret. (Note: A similar story is told of the Decebalus Treasure, buried under a river in 106 AD. These burials repeat Scythian models from the Lower Danube and the Black Sea. See the following Spanish-language source: Alarico I (in Spanish), Diccionario biográfico español, Luis Agustín García Moreno, Real Academia de la Historia.)

== Aftermath ==
Alaric was succeeded in the command of the Gothic army by his brother-in-law, Ataulf, who married Honorius's sister Galla Placidia three years later. Following in the wake of Alaric's leadership, which Kulikowski claims, had given his people "a sense of community that survived his own death ... Alaric's Goths remained together inside the empire, going on to settle in Gaul. There, in the province of Aquitaine, they put down roots and created the first autonomous barbarian kingdom inside the frontiers of the Roman empire." The Goths were able to settle in Aquitaine only after Honorius granted the once Roman province to them, sometime in 418 or 419. Not long after Alaric's exploits in Rome and Athaulf's settlement in Aquitaine, there is a "rapid emergence of Germanic barbarian groups in the West" who begin controlling many western provinces. These barbarian peoples included: Vandals in Spain and Africa, Visigoths in Spain and Aquitaine, Burgundians along the upper Rhine and southern Gaul, and Franks on the lower Rhine and in northern and central Gaul.

== Sources ==
The chief authorities on the career of Alaric are: the historian Orosius and the poet Claudian, both contemporary, neither disinterested; Zosimus, a historian who lived probably about half a century after Alaric's death; and Jordanes, a Goth who wrote the history of his nation in 551, basing his work on Cassiodorus's Gothic History.

== See also ==
- Alaric II
- Gaiseric
- Odoacer

== Bibliography ==
- Bauer, Susan Wise (2010). The History of the Medieval World: From the Conversion of Constantine to the First Crusade. New York: W. W. Norton & Company. ISBN 978-0-39305-975-5.
- Bayless, William N. (1976). "The Visigothic Invasion of Italy in 401". The Classical Journal. 72 (1): 65–67. JSTOR 3296883.
- Bradley, Henry (1888). The Goths: from the Earliest Times to the End of the Gothic Dominion in Spain. New York: G.P. Putnam's Sons.
- Boin, Douglas (2020). Alaric the Goth: An Outsider's History of the Fall of Rome. New York: W.W. Norton & Co. ISBN 978-0-39363-569-0.
- Brown, Peter (2000). Augustine of Hippo: A Biography. Berkeley and Los Angeles: University of California Press. ISBN 0-520-22835-9.
- Bunson, Matthew (1995). A Dictionary of the Roman Empire. Oxford and New York: Oxford University Press. ISBN 978-0-19510-233-8.
- Burns, Thomas (1994). Barbarians within the Gates of Rome: A Study of Roman Military Policy and the Barbarians, CA. 375–425 A.D. Bloomington and Indianapolis: Indiana University Press. ISBN 978-0-25331-288-4.
- Burns, Thomas (2003). Rome and the Barbarians, 100 B.C.–A.D. 400. Baltimore, MD: Johns Hopkins University Press. ISBN 978-0-80187-306-5.
- Claudian (1922). Claudian II. Translated by Maurice Platnauer. London: W. Heinemann. ISBN 978-0-67499-151-4.
- Collins, Roger (1999). Early Medieval Europe, 300–1000. New York: St. Martin's Press. ISBN 978-0-31221-885-0.
- Durschmied, Erik (2002). From Armageddon to the Fall of Rome. London: Coronet Books. ISBN 978-0-34082-177-0.
- Frantz, Alison; Thompson, Homer A.; Travlos, John (1988). "Late Antiquity: A.D. 267–700". The Athenian Agora. Vol. 24. pp. 49–56.
- Geary, Patrick J. (1988). Before France and Germany: The Creation & Transformation of the Merovingian World. Oxford and New York: Oxford University Press. ISBN 978-0-19504-458-4.
- Gibbon, Edward (1890). The Decline and Fall of the Roman Empire. Vol. 2. London: W.W. Gibbings. OCLC 254408669.
- Goffart, Walter (2006). Barbarian Tides: The Migration Age and the Later Roman Empire. Philadelphia: University of Pennsylvania Press. ISBN 978-0-81222-105-3.
- Halsall, Guy (2007). Barbarian Migrations and the Roman West, 376–568. Cambridge and New York: Cambridge University Press. ISBN 978-0-52143-543-7.
- Harder, Kelsie B. (1986). Names and Their Varieties: A Collection of Essays in Onomastics. Lanham, MD: University Press of America. ISBN 978-0-81915-233-6.
- Heather, Peter (1991). Goths and Romans, 332–489. Oxford: Clarendon Press. ISBN 978-0-19820-234-9.
- Heather, Peter (2005). The Fall of the Roman Empire: A New History of Rome and the Barbarians. Oxford and New York: Oxford University Press. ISBN 978-0-19515-954-7.
- Heather, Peter (2013). The Restoration of Rome: Barbarian Popes and Imperial Pretenders. Oxford and New York: Oxford University Press. ISBN 978-0-19936-851-8.
- James, Edward (2014). Europe's Barbarians, AD 200–600. London and New York: Routledge. ISBN 978-0-58277-296-0.
- Jordanes (1915). The Gothic History of Jordanes. Translated by Charles C. Mierow. London: Oxford University Press. OCLC 463056290.
- Kelly, Christopher (2009). The End of Empire: Attila the Hun and the Fall of Rome. New York: W.W. Norton & Company. ISBN 978-0-39333-849-2.
- Kulikowski, Michael (2002). "Nation versus Army: A Necessary Contrast?". In Andrew Gillett (ed.). On Barbarian Identity: Critical Approaches to Ethnicity in the Early Middle Ages. Turnhout: Brepols Publishers. ISBN 2-503-51168-6.
- Kulikowski, Michael (2006). Rome's Gothic Wars: From the Third Century to Alaric. Cambridge and New York: Cambridge University Press. ISBN 978-0-521-84633-2.
- Kulikowski, Michael (2019). The Tragedy of Empire: From Constantine to the Destruction of Roman Italy. Cambridge, MA: The Belknap Press of Harvard University Press. ISBN 978-0-67466-013-7.
- Lançon, Bertrand (2001). Rome in Late Antiquity: AD 312–609. New York: Routledge. ISBN 978-0-41592-975-2.
- Lee, A. D. (2013). From Rome to Byzantium AD 363 to 565: The Transformation of Ancient Rome. Edinburgh: Edinburgh University Press. ISBN 978-0-74863-175-9.
- McEvoy, Meaghan (2013). Child Emperor Rule in the Late Roman West, AD 367–455. Oxford and New York: Oxford University Press. ISBN 978-0-19164-210-4.
- Macgeorge, Penny (2002). Late Roman Warlords. Oxford and New York: Oxford University Press. ISBN 0-19-925244-0.
- Mitchell, Stephen (2007). A History of the Later Roman Empire, AD 284–641. Oxford and Malden, MA: Wiley Blackwell.
- Norwich, John Julius (1988). Byzantium: The Early Centuries. London: Viking. ISBN 978-0-67080-251-7.
- Wallace-Hadrill, J. M. (2004). The Barbarian West, 400–1000. Malden, MA: Wiley-Blackwell. ISBN 978-0-63120-292-9.
- Wolfram, Herwig (1997). The Roman Empire and its Germanic Peoples. Berkeley and Los Angeles: University of California Press. ISBN 0-520-08511-6.

=== Online ===
King Alaric I of the Visigoths Balti dynasty Born: 370 Died: 410
Regnal titles
Vacant Title last held by Athanaric	King of the Visigoths; 395–410	Succeeded by Segeric
