= Thomas S. Burns =

American historian (born 1945)

- Born: June 7, 1945 (age 81); Michigan City, Indiana

Academic background
- Education: Wabash College; University of Michigan

Academic work
- Discipline: History
- Institutions: Emory University
- Main interests: "Barbarian"-Roman relations

Thomas Samuel Burns (born June 7, 1945) is an American historian who is Samuel Candler Dobbs Professor Emeritus of Late Ancient and Medieval History at Emory University. He specializes on relations between "barbarians" and Romans in classical antiquity.

== Biography ==
Thomas S. Burns was born in Michigan City, Indiana, on June 7, 1945. He received his A.B. (1967) from Wabash College and his M.A. (1968) and Ph.D. (1974) from the University of Michigan. His thesis was supervised by Sylvia L. Trupp and John W. Eadie.

After gaining his Ph.D., Burns served as Assistant Professor (1974–1980) and then Associate Professor (1980–1985) of History at Emory University. Since 1985, Burns was Samuel Candler Dobbs Professor of Late Ancient and Medieval History at Emory University (1985–2010). He was Chair of the Department of History at Emory University in 1989–1992 and 2006–2007. Burns retired as S. C. Dobbs Professor Emeritus in 2010.

Burns specializes in late ancient and early medieval history and archaeology. He is particularly interested in relationships between "barbarians" and Romans. Burns is well known as an authority on the Ostrogoths.

== Selected works ==
- The Ostrogoths: Kingship and Society, 1980
- A History of the Ostrogoths, 1984
- Barbarians within the Gates of Rome: Roman Military Policy and the Barbarians, ca. 375-425 A.D., 1994
- Rome and the Barbarians, 100 BC - AD 400, 2003

== See also ==
- Peter Heather
- Herwig Wolfram
- E. A. Thompson
- Walter Goffart
- Ian N. Wood
- Patrick J. Geary

== Sources ==
- "Thomas S. Burns". Emory University.
