= Priscus Attalus =

Roman usurper in 409–410 and 414–415

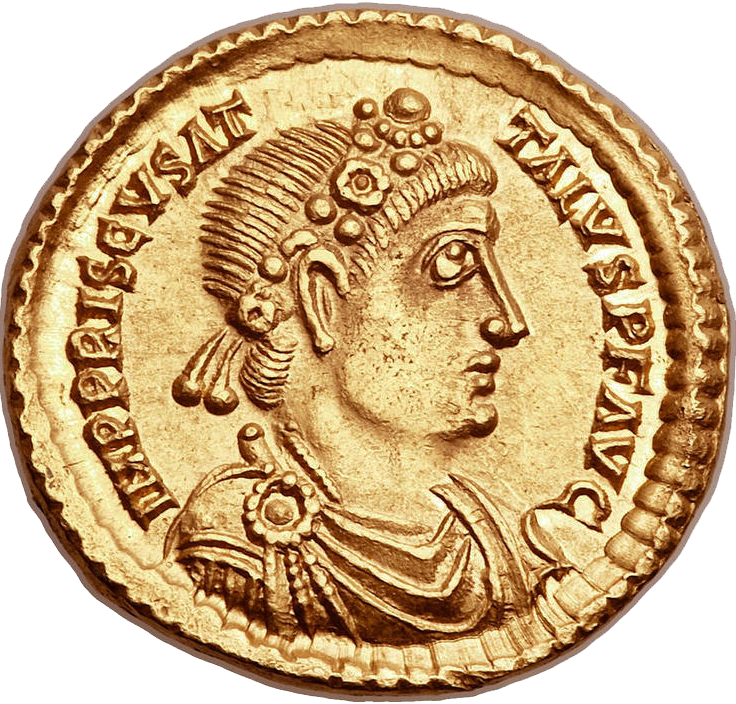
- Solidus of Priscus Attalus, 409

Roman emperor in the West
- Reign: 409–410 and 414–415, against Honorius
- Predecessor: Honorius
- Successor: Honorius
- Died: after 416; Lipari
- Issue: Ampelius
- Father: Publius Ampelius
- Religion: Roman paganism (until 409); Arian Christianity (from 409)

Priscus Attalus (Ancient Greek: Πρίσκος Ἄτταλος; died after 416) was a Roman senator and urban prefect of Rome who was twice proclaimed emperor in the West in opposition to Honorius, in 409–410 and again in 414–415. On both occasions he was elevated with Visigothic support, first by Alaric I and then by Athaulf, and on both occasions his position depended on his patrons: Alaric deposed him when seeking a settlement with the court at Ravenna, and Athaulf's Visigoths abandoned him when the blockade of Gaul forced their withdrawal into Spain. Modern scholarship is divided over the first elevation, which has been read both as a nomination imposed by Alaric on a compliant senate and as the deliberate act of a senatorial majority that had come to prefer an alternative to Honorius.

A pagan by upbringing, Attalus was baptized as an Arian Christian by the Gothic bishop Sigesarius at the time of his first proclamation, making him the last claimant to the Roman imperial office who did not profess Nicene Christianity. After the collapse of his second reign he was captured, displayed at Rome, mutilated and exiled to Lipari, where he died at an unknown date after 416.

== Historical sources ==
No continuous ancient narrative of Attalus survives. The principal source is the lost History of Olympiodorus of Thebes, a work in twenty-two books covering the years 407 to 425 and dedicated to Theodosius II, which is known chiefly from the summary made by the patriarch Photius and from its extensive use by Zosimus in the last book of the New History, as well as by Sozomen and Philostorgius.

R. C. Blockley has argued that Olympiodorus, who described his work as material for a history rather than as a history proper, arranged it topically rather than annalistically. The consequence for Attalus is that Olympiodorus gathered his career into a single retrospective notice (fr. 13) running from the negotiations with Honorius in 409 to his second deposition, mutilation and exile. The same arrangement also introduced error into later writers: because Olympiodorus mentioned the first elevation after his notice of the third siege of Rome, although it had taken place before it, Procopius placed the elevation after the sack of 410. Socrates places it there too, but Blockley holds that he had no clear contact with the Olympiodoran tradition.

The fullest surviving account of the first reign is that of Zosimus, who devotes seven consecutive chapters of his sixth book to the elevation and its aftermath before the text breaks off in 410, four years short of the second usurpation. Ronald Ridley, its modern translator, supposes that the book once went, or was intended to go, down to Alaric's capture of Rome in August of that year. Ridley also finds the narrative doubled in places. On his reading, the senatorial debate over Africa and Jovius' agitation against Attalus at 6.12 are substantially a duplicate of 6.9, while the despatch of Attalus to Rome at 5.46 appears to duplicate that at 5.45, the earlier passage calling him comes sacrarum largitionum and the later prefect of the city, an office he is not thought to have held until late 409.

The Church History of Philostorgius, a Eunomian who wrote between 425 and 433, treats Attalus at 12.3–5. It too survives only in a Photian epitome, and its chapters covering Attalus' second reign and punishment are sparse. The Ecclesiastical History of Sozomen, written at Constantinople between about 443 and 448, covers the elevation and the African expedition at 9.8–9. Rita Lizzi Testa treats the accounts of Philostorgius, Sozomen and Zosimus as three refractions of the same lost Olympiodoran narrative, differing above all in how much initiative each allows the senate.

The earliest surviving account is in Latin. Within three years of Attalus' capture, Orosius completed his Seven Books of History against the Pagans in 418, at the request of Saint Augustine, as an apologetic work arguing that the calamities of the Christian era were no worse than those that had preceded it. He treats Attalus at 7.42.7–10, within a catalogue of the usurpers put down by Honorius and Constantius which opens with Constantine III. The notice is hostile and retrospective: the usurpation, capture and punishment are compressed into a few sentences, and Alaric is said to have made, unmade, remade and again unmade his emperor (facto, infecto, refecto, ac defecto), laughing at the farce and viewing "the comedy of the imperium". In his account of the sack of Rome at 7.39, however, Attalus goes unnamed.

The eastern chronicle tradition is brief and chronologically distorted. Writing at Constantinople in the sixth century, Marcellinus Comes reduces Attalus' career to a single sentence, entered under the year 412. Brian Croke has shown that the date is incorrect and that the notice derives from Orosius 7.42.9. Marcellinus relied on Orosius for western events down to 416 and distributed the contents of Orosius 7.42 across successive consular years, misdating the neighbouring notice of Jovinus and Sebastianus in the same entry. The Chronicon Paschale enters the first usurpation under 411 and does not indicate that the events took place in Italy. Notably, it alone preserves the record of the games held at Constantinople in 416 to mark Attalus' defeat.

== Origins and early career ==
=== Family and education ===
Philostorgius describes Attalus as being of Ionian stock, pagan in religion, and prefect of the city. Lizzi Testa takes the description to place his family in Asia and treats him as an example of the rapid absorption of provincial elites into the late antique senate, although she acknowledges that the statement lacks corroboration elsewhere. Ridley, citing the same notice of Philostorgius together with Sozomen 9.9, instead takes Attalus himself to have been born at Antioch.

He was the son of Publius Ampelius, proconsul of Achaia in 359 and urban prefect of Rome in 370–372, and became a prominent member of the senate in Rome, where he was a friend of leading pagans such as Symmachus and had attained the rank of vir spectabilis by 394. Ampelius was himself a pagan, a native of Antioch, and a poet of some reputation. As governor of Achaia he was praised by the rhetorician Himerius for coordinating public works financed by the cities of Megara, Sparta and Chalcis. As urban prefect he ordered the arrest of the supporters of the antipope Ursinus should they enter Rome, so aligning himself with the party of Damasus, and presided over the senatorial trial of Iulius Festus Hymetius, reviving in the process the assembly's long-unused judicial competence. Lizzi Testa argues that Attalus took his political bearings from his father before he took them from Symmachus.

While Ampelius governed Achaia, Attalus was enrolled in the school of Himerius at Athens, and Lizzi Testa credits that rhetorical training with the reputation for negotiation that later led the senate to entrust him with repeated embassies. Symmachus addressed him as filius and referred to him as "our son Attalus, vir spectabilis", from which she infers a birth before about 350.

=== Senatorial embassies and the urban prefecture ===
The senate repeatedly employed him as an envoy. In 398 he was sent to Honorius to seek relief from Stilicho's demand for recruits (tirones) for the war against Gildo, whom the same senators had declared a public enemy at the end of the previous year. Symmachus wrote to officials at court in support of the request and afterwards congratulated Attalus on its success.

During Alaric's first blockade of Rome in the winter of 408–409, the senate opened its own negotiations with the Visigothic camp through two envoys, Basilius, a Spaniard who had been prefect of Rome in 395, and Iohannes, a client of Alaric personally known to him. At the beginning of 409 a further embassy went to Ravenna, Attalus travelling with Caecilianus and Tarrutenius Maximilianus to press for ratification of the peace with Alaric. It achieved nothing on that point, but Honorius promoted its members: Caecilianus was made praetorian prefect of Italy and retained at court, while Attalus was made comes sacrarum largitionum and sent to Rome, where he removed Heliocrates, who had been charged with recovering the property of Stilicho's associates but had proved unwilling to press the confiscations; Heliocrates escaped punishment by taking sanctuary in a church. Lizzi Testa reads the promotions as an attempt by Olympius to reassert Honorius' authority over the senate.

The embassy was attacked by Alaric's Goths on its return, and the detachment of 6,000 men recalled from Dalmatia to garrison the city was intercepted and almost destroyed, all but a hundred of them being lost; Attalus and its commander Valens reached Rome safely. Maximilianus was captured near Rome and ransomed for 30,000 solidi by his father, whom Zosimus names Marinianus. Ridley identifies the envoy not, as RE had it, with a son of the Marcianus who was proconsul of Africa, but with Tarrutenius Maximilianus, consularis of Picenum. A further delegation reached the court in February 409 under an escort provided by Alaric, and Bishop Innocent I travelled with it. Olympius was then dismissed and fled to Dalmatia. Jovius, a friend of Alaric, was in office as praetorian prefect by 1 April, and Attalus was promoted from comes sacrarum largitionum to urban prefect in March. Lizzi Testa takes the escort as a sign that the senate now largely supported Alaric's terms, arguing that Attalus was again among the envoys, and holds that he had a hand in Olympius' fall, notwithstanding that he owed his own first promotion to him. She further notes that he addressed the people in the amphitheatre during the blockade, and doubts that the crowd showed the enthusiasm for the absent Honorius that it had displayed in 400.

Orosius also refers to him as prefect of the city and draws a parallel between the fall of Babylon and the sack of Rome. He compares Attalus to Arbatus, the prefect who killed Sardanapalus at Babylon and transferred the kingdom to the Medes. According to his reading, the attempt succeeded at Babylon but was frustrated in Rome with the aid of a Christian emperor.

== First reign (409–410) ==
=== Elevation ===
Philostorgius reports that, following the execution of Stilicho in August 408, Stilicho's son Eucherius was killed on Honorius' orders in violation of sanctuary, and that this drove Stilicho's barbarian troops to join Alaric and incited him to war. In the same account, Alaric's first action against Rome was the seizure of Portus, the harbour complex at the Tiber mouth where the city's public grain supply was stored, after which the city was reduced by starvation.

Late in 409, during Alaric's second blockade of the city, the harbour fell again and with it the whole of the city's stored provisions. Faced with certain starvation, the senate accepted Alaric's terms and on 3 November proclaimed Attalus emperor, investing him with the purple and a "crown". He was then baptized by Sigesarius, an Arian bishop of the Goths.

The three surviving accounts differ over how far the senate acted of its own volition. Philostorgius reports that Alaric permitted the Romans a free choice in the matter; Sozomen has him compel them to vote for Attalus; and Zosimus passes over the vote altogether, recording only the investiture. Philip Amidon regards Philostorgius' version as most probably an error introduced by Photius in epitomizing, and suggests that Philostorgius wrote something closer to Sozomen's account. Lizzi Testa reaches the opposite conclusion. She prefers Philostorgius on the grounds that he and Sozomen both describe the choice with the verb ψηφίζω (psēphizō, 'to vote'), and that Zosimus retained only the regalia because for a writer of his period it was the investiture ceremonial, rather than any senatorial procedure, that conferred legitimacy. She adds that Zosimus, familiar with the political habits of the later senate at Constantinople, was poorly placed to credit the western senate of 409 with autonomous planning, and that modern scholars trained on Mommsen's Römisches Staatsrecht, which held that Constantine had reduced the senate to a municipal body, inherited the same difficulty.

On her reading, the elevation was the work of a senatorial majority that had been forming since Stilicho's death and that wished to be rid of Honorius, with the unstated further aim of neutralizing Alaric once a new emperor was in place. She observes that Otto Seeck and Ernst Stein had implicitly followed Philostorgius, and that Maria Cesa, Valerio Neri, Hans Lejdegård and Giovanni Cecconi have since argued that the senate chose Attalus of its own accord even if Alaric forced the timing. She acknowledges that the prevailing view, represented by John Matthews, Peter Heather, Michael Kulikowski and others, treats Attalus as the puppet of a Germanic king-maker, and that the underlying model is sound, since Germanic generals could not themselves take the purple and so supported pliable emperors; she argues only that Attalus is an exception to it.

=== Government and programme ===
Attalus appointed Postumius Lampadius as praetorian prefect and Marcianus as prefect of the city. Lizzi Testa identifies the latter, with reservations, as the Marcianus who had ransomed his son from the Goths; Ridley rejects the filiation. Ridley doubts a second identification, that of the new praetorian prefect with the Lampadius who in 408 had denounced the senate's payment to Alaric as "slavery rather than peace" and who was perhaps urban prefect in early 398: such a man, he objects, would seem too Christian and too hostile to the barbarians to serve Attalus. The mastership of the soldiers was divided between Alaric and Valens, previously dux of Dalmatia, though the sources disagree whether Alaric was made magister militum or magister utriusque militiae. Athaulf was made comes domesticorum equitum, and the post of magister officiorum fell to Iohannes, the primicerius notariorum who had served on the senatorial embassy to Alaric during the previous winter and stood well with him. The consulship went to Tertullus, a pagan whom Olympiodorus praised.

Lizzi Testa reads the distribution as deliberate rather than incidental: every civil office went to a Roman, and the military commands were not placed exclusively in Gothic hands, a point Ridley also makes in noting that both Athaulf and Alaric had Roman colleagues in the major generalships. Of Tertullus, Orosius reports words spoken in the senate house, where he addressed the members as consul and looked forward to the office of pontifex. Orosius treated the claim as an instance of hope wrongly placed in man.

Attalus took up residence in the palace and addressed the senate on the day after his accession, undertaking to bring the whole world under Roman rule, a programme answering to the hopes of pagans and Arians for a reunited empire. Sozomen reports a promise to restore the ancestral rights (τὰ πάτρια, ta patria) of the assembly, to subject Egypt, and to bring the eastern half of the empire under the rule of Italy. By the ancestral rights Lizzi Testa understands the right of the curia to make emperors, demonstrated by Attalus' own elevation, and perhaps also its right to be consulted on war and peace. No emperor, she notes, had addressed the senate on the day after his accession in decades; she reads the gesture as an evocation of the principate of the first and second centuries. The new administration was welcomed in Rome, and only the Anicii, who controlled much of the city's wealth, are said to have resented it.

That Attalus expected to rule both halves of the empire is supported, on Lizzi Testa's account, by two omissions. He made no attempt to marry Galla Placidia, Honorius' half-sister, who was probably in Rome at the time and would have given him a connection to the Theodosian dynasty; and behind the further undertakings that Zosimus reports but does not specify, she suspects a promise to remove the young Theodosius II. Two laws issued before the sack, on 12 February and 24 April 410, indicate that both Ravenna and Constantinople feared the usurpation might spread.

=== Africa and the war against Honorius ===
Africa and its grain remained in the hands of Heraclian, the comes Africae loyal to Honorius, who had been given the African command in place of Bathanarius as his reward for the murder of Stilicho; his cruelty, avarice and drunkenness were notorious. Alaric urged that a Gothic force under Drumas be sent to remove him. But Attalus, encouraged by seers who promised him Africa without a battle, would not send barbarian troops, and instead dispatched a Roman officer, Constans, with inadequate forces. Lizzi Testa rejects the story of the seers, which she ascribes to Zosimus' need to explain Attalus' downfall as the punishment of arrogance; the size of the force, she argues, indicates that Constans was sent to negotiate Heraclian's defection rather than to fight. The expedition was defeated, Constans was killed, and the African grain shipments were not restored. Orosius adds that Heraclian also had to defend the province against magistrates sent by Attalus, and was afterwards rewarded with the consulship by Honorius. He presents Heraclian as having been made comes during Attalus' reign.

Attalus nevertheless advanced on Ravenna with Alaric acting as his general, and demanded that Honorius retire into private life. Philostorgius states that Attalus also required Honorius to purchase his safety by the amputation of his extremities. On the reconstruction followed by Amidon, however, the demand put to Honorius was for his retirement to an isolated place with the trappings but not the substance of office, and the proposal of mutilation was added by the praetorian prefect Jovius, who then changed sides. Zosimus makes Jovius the praetorian prefect appointed by Attalus, and has him declare that Attalus would leave Honorius neither the title of emperor nor a sound body, but would maim him and exile him to an island. Ridley doubts each element of the notice: Lampadius, not Jovius, was Attalus' praetorian prefect, Jovius being probably Honorius' own, and it is unlikely that he made such threats openly. What Zosimus appears to have obscured, on his reading, is that it was Attalus who was repelled by Jovius' brutal proposal. Honorius had assembled ships to flee when 4,000 troops arrived from the East. He set them to guard the walls and resolved to await the outcome of the fighting in Africa, intending, if it went against him, to sail to Theodosius II and abandon the West altogether.

Jovius asked the senate to excuse him from completing the embassy and argued there for a barbarian expedition against Heraclian. Attalus responded by sending further men and money of his own, and Alaric, despairing of the regime, abandoned the siege of Ravenna. Valens was suspected of treason and killed while Alaric, still nominally loyal to Attalus, reduced the cities of Aemilia that had refused to recognize him, failing only at Bononia before passing into Liguria to enforce recognition there. These northern campaigns Lizzi Testa presents as a joint undertaking of emperor and general rather than the work of Alaric alone. For her, it was the possession of Africa, rather than the fighting in northern Italy or before Ravenna, that decided Attalus' fate and so indirectly brought about the sack of Rome. Heraclian's blockade of the African ports meanwhile produced a famine at Rome worse than the first, and the crowd in the circus called for a price to be set on human flesh.

=== Deposition ===
Attalus returned to Rome and put the African question to the senate once more. It had at first refused outright to send a barbarian army to the province; on the second occasion it voted almost unanimously to send Gothic troops under Drumas, and Attalus was among the small minority still unwilling to send barbarians out with the Roman army. Alaric, whom Jovius had for some time been urging to overthrow the emperor, thereupon broke with him: he summoned Attalus to Ariminum in about July 410 and deposed him in a public ceremony, taking away his diadem, stripping him of the purple and sending both to Honorius at Ravenna.

Blockley suggests that Alaric's use of Attalus had throughout been calculated: the elevation was intended as much to press Honorius towards a settlement as to replace him, and when Alaric turned instead to negotiating on the basis of recognizing Honorius, Attalus became an obstacle and was removed; the return of the regalia served as a signal of the change of policy. Philostorgius preserves two explanations of the deposition, the second of which corresponds to Blockley's reading, and places it at Portus rather than at Ariminum. Alaric then moved on Ravenna to negotiate. Frustrated once more by Honorius, who was influenced by the Goth Sarus, he marched on Rome, imposed a third blockade and entered the city by the Porta Salaria on 24 August 410. News travelled slowly: a law of 24 April shows that Attalus' regime was still believed to be in existence at Constantinople four months before the sack.

== Between the reigns (410–414) ==
Alaric kept Attalus and his son Ampelius with him after the deposition, intending to secure their pardon in his settlement with Honorius. Galla Placidia, the emperor's sister, was in the same camp as a hostage, and was treated with the honours due to her rank. Attalus remained with the Visigoths and accompanied them into Gaul, and at the marriage of Athaulf and Galla Placidia at Narbo in January 414 he composed the epithalamium. Olympiodorus gave the occasion considerable emphasis, stressing the Roman character of the ceremony and the approval of Goths and Romans alike, and Blockley reads the passage as part of the historian's wider advocacy of an accommodation between the two peoples. Philostorgius, by contrast, interpreted the same marriage through the prophecy of the statue of iron and clay in Daniel 2:31–45, as a sign of a divided kingdom that would not endure.

== Second reign (414–415) ==
In response to the naval blockade imposed by the general and future emperor Constantius, Athaulf proclaimed Attalus emperor for a second time in southern Gaul in 414. Ridley, following Olympiodorus and Prosper, attributes the step to the pressure of famine. The blockade nevertheless forced the Visigoths to abandon Gaul for Spain in 415, and Attalus was left behind.

== Capture, mutilation and exile ==
The circumstances of Attalus' capture are reported differently. Orosius has him taken into Spain with the Goths and boarding a ship from there on an uncertain course, only to be captured at sea, brought to Constantius and presented to Honorius. Marcellinus Comes reproduces the notice in abbreviated form, recording only that Attalus was captured at sea and brought before Honorius. Philostorgius instead makes his surrender part of the settlement that followed Athaulf's murder, by which the Visigoths received provisions and land in Gaul and handed over both Attalus and Placidia to Honorius.

Attalus was displayed at Rome in Honorius' triumph of June 416. According to Philostorgius, Honorius, who had come to the city to encourage its resettlement after the sack, mounted a dais and compelled Attalus to stand on its lowest step. The thumb and forefinger of Attalus' right hand were then cut off. He was banished to the island of Lipari, where no further penalty was imposed on him and he was supplied with the necessities of life. The Orosian tradition, followed by Prosper and Marcellinus, states more generally that his hand was cut off and his life spared.

The victory was celebrated at Rome and again at Constantinople, where the city prefect Ursus presented a theatrical spectacle on 28 June 416 and chariot races for the same occasion on 7 July. Croke raises the possibility that it was the defeat of Attalus, rather than that of John in 425 or of Maximus in 388, that was commemorated on the Golden Gate at Constantinople.

Attalus died in exile on Lipari at an unknown date after 416. The fate of his son Ampelius is likewise unknown.

== Religion ==
Philostorgius took Attalus to be a pagan, and Lizzi Testa concludes that he was born and raised a cultivated one. Sozomen reports that his fall dismayed pagans and Arians alike: pagans because they had inferred from his interests and his early education that he would declare his paganism openly and restore the temples, festivals and sacrifices; Arians because his baptism by Sigesarius had led them to expect a return to the position they had enjoyed under Constantius II and Valens.

From the same passage Alan Cameron argued that Attalus put career before religion, since he accepted baptism immediately on his elevation; that his officials cannot have been pagans, because such appointments would have undone the effect of that baptism; and that his being described as baptized rather than converted implies that he was already a catechumen. Lizzi Testa disputes each point. The choice of an Arian bishop, she holds, may have rested on intellectual as well as political grounds, since pagans and Arians shared objections to Nicene Christology; his paganism had not prevented him from appointing pagan, Christian and Arian officials, and his baptism did not alter those collaborations; and a prior catechumenate is unlikely, as the practice is documented for Catholics but not for Arians. He chose his ministers for shared political aims, and the mixed confessional character of his government may itself have formed part of his programme, as a rebuke to the recent exclusion of non-Catholics from imperial service.

The evidence for the religion of individual ministers is thin and inconsistent. Lizzi Testa finds no sufficient grounds for calling Postumius Lampadius a pagan, considers that Marcianus may be the apostate attacked in the Carmen contra paganos, and regards Iohannes as probably a Christian. On the evidence of that same poem, Ridley records that Nicomachus Flavianus induced Marcianus to renounce Christianity in order to hold the proconsulship of Africa under Eugenius in 394. From Tertullus' hope of being made pontifex maximus by the emperor, Lizzi Testa infers that Attalus himself held or claimed that office, either filling vacancies in the pontifical college as earlier emperors had done or seeking election to it alongside his election as princeps.

Attalus' reign has been read as a pagan reaction against a century of Christian emperors, notably by Giacomo Manganaro and Stewart Oost, and John Matthews and François Paschoud held that most of Attalus' appointees were pagans. Cameron rejected the whole construction, coining the label "mini pagan revival" of 409–410 in order to deny it. Lizzi Testa accepts neither position. Pagan observance did figure in the months before the elevation. The senators whom Sozomen calls Hellenizing thought sacrifice on the Capitol necessary, and Etruscan diviners who claimed to have saved Narnia by the same means offered to do as much for Rome, with the consent of the urban prefect Gabinius Barbarus Pompeianus. Religion, she argues, was nevertheless not the trigger of the usurpation. On her account the senators who elected Attalus made a political choice, seeking a stable alternative to Honorius, and the symbols of eternal Rome were valuable to them precisely because they permitted the cooperation of officials of differing beliefs and commanded a broad popular consensus.

== See also ==
- Roman civil war of 407–415
- List of Roman usurpers
