= Zosimus =

Zosimus, Zosimos, Zosima or Zosimas may refer to:

== People ==
=== Religious figures ===
==== Saints ====
- Rufus and Zosimus (died 107), martyrs
- Zosimus (martyr) (died 110), martyr executed in Umbria, Italy
- Zosimus the Hermit, 3rd-century ascetic
- Zosimus, bishop of Naples (c. 356 – c. 362)
- Zosimas of Palestine (c. 460 – c. 560), Palestinian monk and ascetic
- Pope Zosimus (died 418), bishop of Rome from 417 to 418
- Zosimus of Tuman (fl. 1350 – c. 1400), Sinaite monk in Serbia
- Zosimas of Solovki (died 1478), Russian Orthodox saint, monk and founder of Solovetsky Monastery
- Zosimus, Metropolitan of Moscow (died 1494), Metropolitan of Moscow and Russia and author of the Third Rome conception

==== Others ====
- John Zosimus (Ioane-Zosime), 10th-century Georgian monk and hymnist
- Zosimus (bishop of Várad) (died c. 1265), Hungarian prelate

=== Others ===
- Zosimos of Panopolis, also known as Zosimus Alchemista, 3rd-century alchemist
- Zosimus (historian) (c. 490–510) 5th-century Byzantine historian
- Zosimus the Epigrammist in Anthologia Graeca
- Zosimos of Samosata, mosaicist at Zeugma
- Michael J. Moran (died 1846), Irish street entertainer and poet, popularly known as Zozimus
- Zosimo Paredes (born 1948), Filipino politician

=== Fictional characters ===
- Zosima, character in the 1880 novel The Brothers Karamazov by Fyodor Dostoyevsky

== Biology ==
- Zosimus (crab), a genus of crabs in the family Xanthidae
- Zosima (plant), a genus of plants in the family Apiaceae

== See also ==
- Story of Zosimus, Old Testament apocrypha
