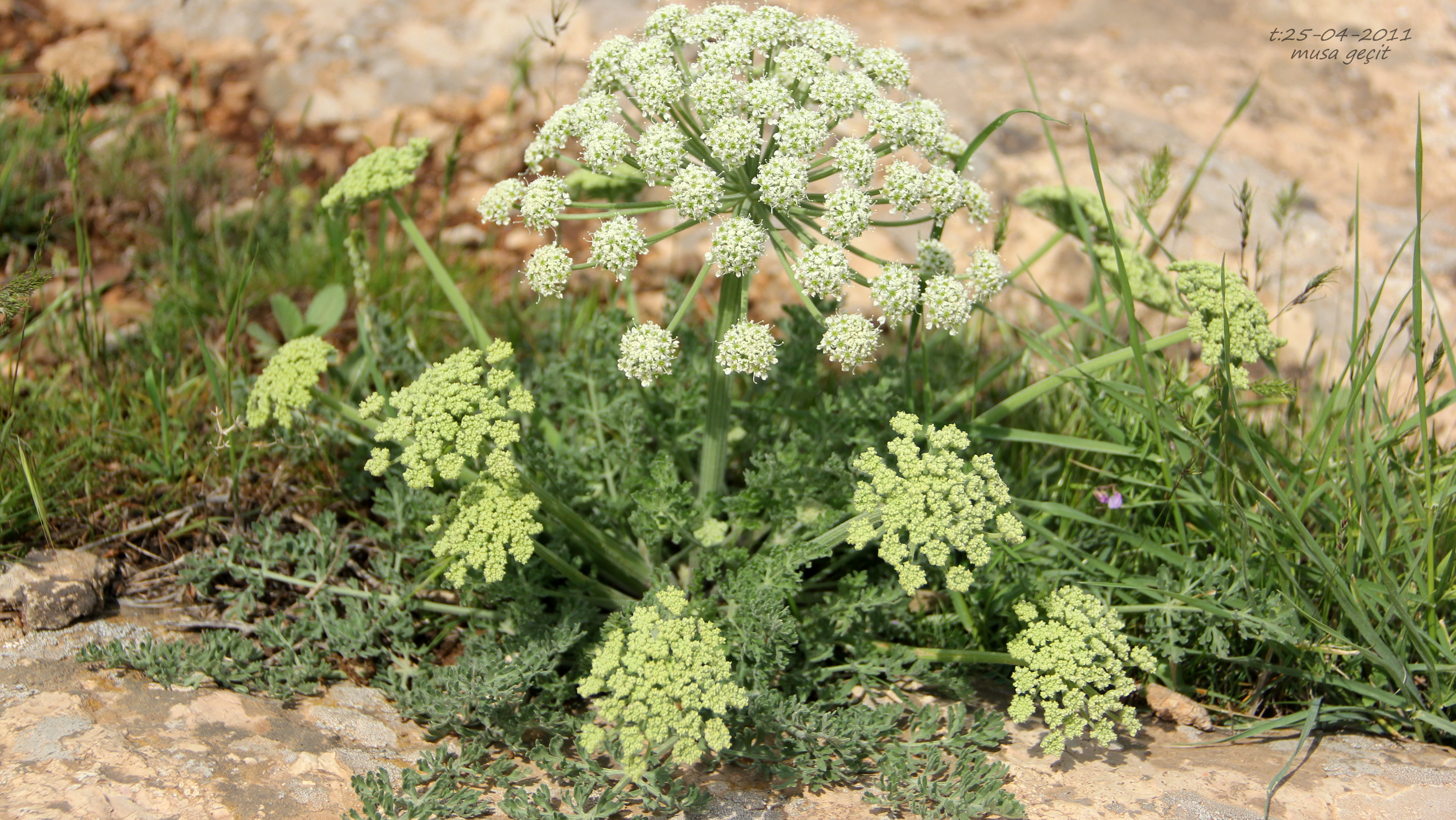
- Zosima absinthifolia

Scientific classification
- Kingdom: Plantae
- Clade: Tracheophytes
- Clade: Angiosperms
- Clade: Eudicots
- Clade: Asterids
- Order: Apiales
- Family: Apiaceae
- Subfamily: Apioideae
- Tribe: Tordylieae
- Subtribe: Tordyliinae
- Genus: Zosima; Hoffm.

Synonyms
- Pichleria Stapf & Wettst.

= Zosima (plant) =

Species of flowering plant

Zosima is a genus of flowering plants belonging to the family Apiaceae.

Its native range stretches from Afghanistan, Cyprus, Egypt, Iran, Iraq, Lebanon, Palestine, Sinai, Syria and Turkey, (in western Asia); Saudi Arabia, to North Caucasus and Transcaucasus, (in the Caucasus Mountains); Kazakhstan, Kyrgyzstan, Tadzhikistan, Turkmenistan and Uzbekistan, (in Central Asia); Xinjiang (in China) and Pakistan (in tropical Asia).

== Description ==
They are herbaceous plants, biennial or monocarpic perennials. They have thick, yellow-red roots that are fusiform (rod-shaped). The stem is usually solitary, densely pubescent (has soft downy hairs), angled, corymbose-branched (branches arising at different points but reaching about the same height). The base of the stem is clothed in fibrous remnant sheaths. It has 1-2 leaves that are pinnatisect. The upper leaves are narrowly elliptic. The flower or inflorescence is compound umbels. They have 10-25 rays. The bracts and bracteoles are present, and linear to lanceolate (in shape). The flowers are hermaphrodite with calyx teeth minute. The petals are whitish, obcordate (broad and notched at the tip), with a narrow apex, inflexed and the outer petals are slightly enlarged (radiant). The fruit (or seed capsule) is broadly ovate, strongly dorsally compressed, densely minute-pubescent. The dorsal ribs are filiform (thread-like) with the marginal ribs broadly thin-winged. The distal parts are inflated and corky. The outer mesocarp layer is parenchymatous (a versatile ground tissue composed of living primary cells) and the inner layer is sclerified (thick, lignified, cell wall that is shorter than a fiber cell). The vittae (resin canals) are large, 1 in each furrow, 2 on commissure. The seed face is plane with a carpophore 2-parted to base.

The plants are close in form to Heracleum but the fruit differ.

The plants can be affected by parasites such as Erysiphe heraclei (leaf), Acmaeoderella gibbosula and Acmaeoderella villosula (stem) and also Bruchophagus gibbus (affects the fruit).

== Known species ==
There are 4 accepted species, by Plants of the World Online and others, including Y. Menemen and S.L. Jury;

- Zosima absinthiifolia (Vent.) Link
- Zosima gilliana Rech.f. & Riedl
- Zosima korovinii Pimenov
- Zosima radians Boiss. & Hohen.

== Taxonomy ==
The genus name of Zosima is in honour of Nikolaos Zosima (1758–1842), Anastasios Zosima (1754–1828) and Zois Zosima (1764–1828), all were Greek-Russian brothers and merchants in Moscow, who supported naturalists. It was first described and published in Gen. Pl. Umbell. on page 145 in 1814.

The genus is recognized by the United States Department of Agriculture and the Agricultural Research Service, but they only list 1 known species, Zosima absinthiifolia.

== Uses ==
Zosima absinthiifolia (bara gwathak or gwathak) has been used in folk medicine in Pakistan, the stem and leaves are crushed into a powder and used to treat indigestion and stomach ache. In 2011, it was anaylised by Bahadir, O.; Citoglu, G.S.; Ozbek, H.; Dall'Acqua, S.; Hosek, J.; Smejkal, K. Hepatoprotective and TNF-alpha inhibitory activity of Zoisma absinthiifolia extracts and coumarins. Fifoterapia 2011, 82, 454–459.
