= Jovinus =

- Usurper of the Western Roman Empire
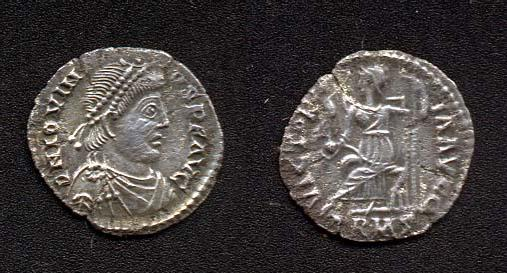
- Siliqua of Jovinus celebrating the "victories of the emperor"
- Reign: 411–412 (alone); 412–413 (co-emperor with Sebastianus)
- Predecessor: Constantine III
- Successor: Honorius
- Born: Gaul
- Died: 413; Narbonne
Names
- Jovinus
Regnal name
- Imperator Caesar Jovinus Augustus

Jovinus was a Gallo-Roman senator and usurper against Roman emperor Honorius from 411 to 413.

Following the defeat of the usurper known as Constantine III, Jovinus was proclaimed emperor at Mainz in 411, a puppet supported by Gundahar, king of the Burgundians, and Goar, king of the Alans. Jovinus kept his position in Gaul for two years, long enough to issue coinage that showed him wearing the imperial diadem. He was supported by a number of local Gallo-Roman nobles who had survived Constantine's defeat.

Under the pretext of Jovinus' imperial authority, Gundahar and his Burgundians established themselves on the left bank of the Rhine (the Roman side) between the river Lauter and the Nahe. Here they founded a kingdom with the old Romanized Gaulish settlement of Borbetomagus (Worms) as its capital.

Jovinus' end came after the Visigoths under Ataulf left Italy (at Priscus Attalus' advice), ostensibly to join him, carrying with them as hostages the ex-emperor Attalus and Galla Placidia, Honorius' half-sister. Then Ataulf attacked and killed Sarus, who had also come to support Jovinus. Jovinus, offended at this act, then failed to consult Ataulf when he elevated his brother Sebastianus as co-emperor. Insulted, Ataulf allied his Visigoths with Honorius, and they defeated Jovinus' troops. Sebastianus was executed. Jovinus fled for his life, but was besieged and captured in Valentia (Valence, Drôme) and taken to Narbo (Narbonne), where Claudius Postumus Dardanus, the praetorian prefect (governor) in Gaul, who had remained loyal to Honorius, had him executed. Jovinus' and Sebastianus' heads were afterwards sent to Honorius and mounted on the walls of Ravenna (before being passed on to Carthage, (Note: Bury (1889) argues that, in mentioning "Carthage," the historian Olympiodorus of Thebes was in fact referring to Carthago Nova in Hispania. According to this interpretation, Honorius would have sought to proclaim his victories in the region of his lineage's origin, then so ravaged by nomadic peoples.) where they were put on permanent display with the heads of Maximus of Hispania and three other usurpers). (Note: Most likely Heraclianus, Constantine III and his son Julian)
