= Sebastianus =

- Usurper of the Western Roman Empire
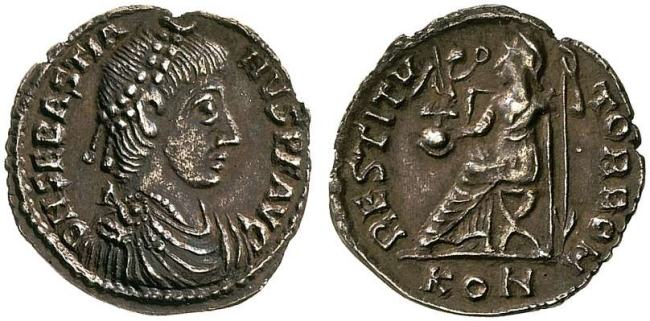
- Siliqua of Sebastianus
- Reign: 412–413 (co-emperor with Jovinus)
- Predecessor: Jovinus (alone)
- Successor: Honorius
- Died: 413
Names
- Sebastianus
Regnal name
- Imperator Caesar Sebastianus Augustus

Sebastianus (fl. 411–413), a brother of Jovinus, was an aristocrat of southern Gaul. After Jovinus usurped the throne of the western Roman Emperor Honorius in Gaul in 411, he named Sebastianus as Augustus (co-emperor) in 412. Coins bearing Sebastianus' image were then minted at Arles and Trier.

Due to broken relations between Jovinus and King Ataulf of the Visigoths, however, Ataulf captured Sebastianus in 413 and turned him over to Dardanus, Honorius' praetorian governor in Gaul. Dardanus then executed Sebastianus and sent his head to Honorius' court at Ravenna.
