= Sigeric =

5th-century Visigothic king

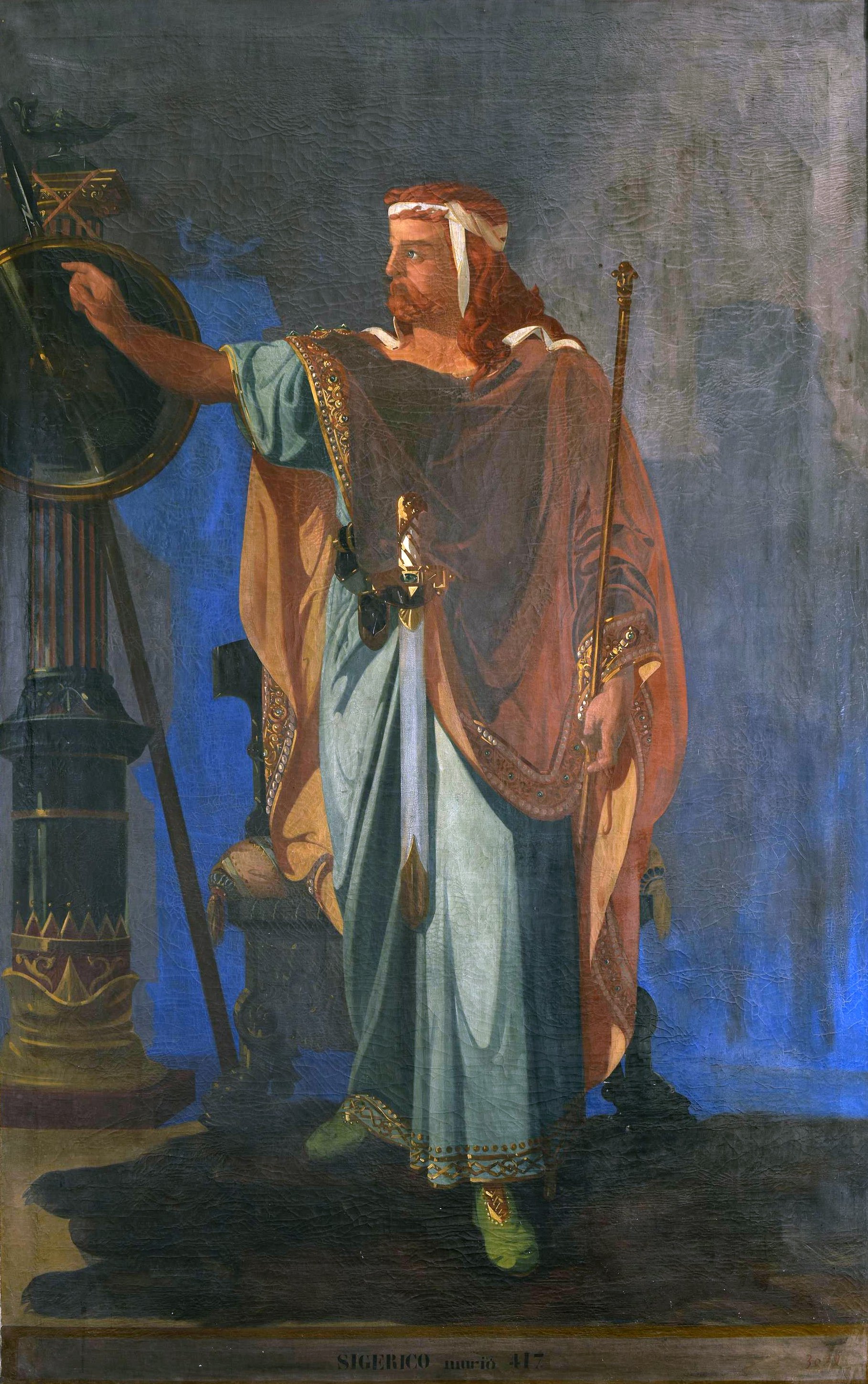
- Posthumous portrait of Sigeric painted in 1856

King of the Visigoths
- Reign: 15–22 August 415
- Predecessor: Athaulf
- Successor: Wallia
- Died: August 22, 415

Sigeric (? – 22 August 415) was a Visigoth king for seven days in 415 AD.

== Biography ==
His predecessor, Ataulf, had been mortally wounded in his stables at the palace of Barcelona by an assassin. The assassin was probably a loyal servant of Sarus, a Gothic noble and personal enemy whom Ataulf had earlier slain. At Ataulf's death, Sarus' faction, the Amali, violated the Gothic tradition of succession by immediately making Sigeric, the brother of Sarus, king.

After becoming the king, Sigeric murdered Ataulf's children by his first wife. He also forced Galla Placidia, widow to Ataulf and daughter of Roman Emperor Theodosius I and sister to Emperor Honorius to walk more than twelve miles on foot among the crowd of captives driven ahead of the mounted Sigeric. On the seventh day after his accession, Sigeric was assassinated and replaced him with Ataulf's relative, Wallia.

Because Sigeric was an Amali, a member of a rival clan-based subgroup among the Visigoths to the Balti (of which Ataulf and Wallia were part), Sigeric is the only one who does not belong in the succession of kings usually labeled the Balti dynasty, if the kingship is defined by Balti dynastic connections. Due to this, as well as to the fact that his reign was a usurpation, and brief, Sigeric does not appear on some Visigothic king lists.

== References and external links ==
- Henry Bradley, The Goths: from the Earliest Times to the End of the Gothic Dominion in Spain. Second edition, 1883, New York: G.P. Putnam's Sons, chapter 11.
- Edward Gibbon, History of the Decline and Fall of the Roman Empire, chapter 31

Specific

King Sigeric of the Visigoths Amali dynasty Died: 415
Regnal titles
Preceded by Athaulf	King of the Visigoths; 415	Succeeded by Wallia
