= Athaulf =

King of the Visigoths

- King of the Visigoths
- Posthumous portrait of Athaulf painted in 1858
- Reign: 411–415
- Predecessor: Segeric
- Successor: Sigeric
- Born: c. 370
- Died: 415
- Spouse: 1) Unknown; 2) Galla Placidia
- Dynasty: Balti dynasty
- Father: Athanaric
- Religion: Arianism

Athaulf (also Athavulf, Atawulf, or Ataulf and Adolf, Latinized as Ataulphus) (c. 370 – 15 August 415) was king of the Visigoths from 411 to 415. During his reign, he transformed the Visigothic state from a tribal kingdom to a major political power of late antiquity.

== Life ==
He was unanimously elected to the throne to succeed the murdered short-lived King Segeric after he himself had been elected in the wake of the death of King Alaric, who had been struck down by a fever suddenly in Calabria. King Athaulf's first act was to halt Alaric's southward expansion of the Goths in Italy.

Meanwhile, Gaul had been separated from the Western Roman Empire by the usurper Constantine III as a result of the Civil war. So in 411 Constantius, the magister militum (master of military) of the western emperor, Flavius Augustus Honorius, with Gothic auxiliaries under Ulfilas, crushed the Gallic rebellion with a siege of Arles. There, Constantine and his son were offered an honorable capitulation— but were beheaded in September on their way to pay homage to Honorius at Ravenna.

In the spring of 412, Constantius pressed Athaulf. Taking the advice of Priscus Attalus—the former emperor whom Alaric had set up at Rome in opposition to Honorius at Ravenna, and who had remained with the Visigoths after he'd been deposed—Athaulf led his followers out of Italy. Moving north into a momentarily pacified Gaul, the Visigoths lived off the countryside in the usual way. Athaulf may have received some additional encouragement in the form of payments in gold from the Emperor Honorius—since Athaulf carried with him as a respected hostage the emperor's half-sister Galla Placidia, who had long been his captive.

Once in Gaul, Athaulf opened negotiations with a new usurper, the Gallic Jovinus. But while on his way to meet Jovinus, Athaulf came across Sarus and some of his men. Athaulf attacked, captured, and later executed Sarus, continuing the feud between their families that had begun with Sarus and Alaric. Jovinus then named his brother Sebastianus (Sebastian) as Augustus (co-emperor). This offended Athaulf, who hadn't been consulted. So he allied his Visigoths with Honorius. Jovinus' troops were defeated in battle, Sebastianus was captured, and Jovinus fled for his life. Athaulf then turned Sebastianus over for execution to Honorius' Gallic praetorian prefect (provincial governor), Claudius Postumus Dardanus. After this, Athaulf besieged and captured Jovinus at Valentia (Valence) in 413, sending him to Narbo (Narbonne), where he was executed by Dardanus.

The heads of Sebastianus and Jovinus arrived at Honorius' court in Ravenna in late August, to be sent forward for displaying among other usurpers on the walls of Carthage. However, the good relations between Athaulf and Honorius did not last. Their relationship soon deteriorated due to a new conflict caused by the War of Heraclianus in Africa. Heraclianus stopped the grain shipments from Africa, which prevented the emperor from delivering on his promise to provide the Visigoths in Gaul. Athaulf, in turn, refused to release Galla Placidia and his army resumed their hostilities against the Romans, taking the cities of Narbonne, Tolosa and Burdígala (present-day Bordeaux). In an attempt to conquer the city of Marseille, Ataulf was injured in a Roman attack led by Bonifatius.

Nevertheless the relations between Athaulf and Honorius improved sufficiently for Athaulf to cement them by marrying Galla Placidia at Narbo in January 414, but Jordanes says he married her in Italy, at Forlì (Forum Livii). The nuptials were celebrated with high Roman festivities and magnificent gifts from the Gothic booty. Priscus Attalus gave the wedding speech, a classical epithalamium.

Under Athaulf's rule, the Visigoths could not be said to be masters of a settled kingdom until Athaulf took possession of Narbonne and Toulouse in 413. Although Athaulf remained an Arian Christian, his relationship with Roman culture was summed up, from a Catholic Roman perspective, by the words that the contemporary Christian apologist Orosius put into his mouth, Athaulf's Declaration:

"At first I wanted to erase the Roman name and convert all Roman territory into a Gothic empire: I longed for Romania to become Gothia, and Athaulf to be what Caesar Augustus had been. But long experience has taught me that the ungoverned wildness of the Goths will never submit to laws, and that without law a state is not a state. Therefore I have more prudently chosen the different glory of reviving the Roman name with Gothic vigour, and I hope to be acknowledged by posterity as the initiator of a Roman restoration, since it is impossible for me to alter the character of this Empire"

Honorius's general Constantius (who would later become Emperor Constantius III), poisoned official relations with Athaulf and gained permission to blockade the Mediterranean ports of Gaul. In reply, Athaulf acclaimed Priscus Attalus as Augustus in Bordeaux in 414. However, Constantius' naval blockade was successful and, in 415, Athaulf withdrew with his people into northern Hispania. Attalus fled, fell into the hands of Constantius, and was banished to the island of Lipari.

Galla Placidia traveled with Athaulf. Their son, Theodosius, died in infancy and was buried in Hispania in a silver-plated coffin, thus eliminating an opportunity for a Romano-Visigothic line.

== Death and aftermath ==
In Hispania, Athaulf imprudently accepted into his service one of the late Sarus' followers, unaware that the man harbored a secret desire to avenge the death of his beloved patron. Thus, in the palace at Barcelona, the man brought Athaulf's reign to a sudden end by killing him while he was alone visiting the stables.

Sigeric, the brother of Sarus, immediately became king—for a mere seven days, when he was also murdered and succeeded by Wallia. Under the latter's reign, Galla Placidia was returned to Ravenna where, in 417, at the urging of Honorius, she remarried, her new husband being the implacable enemy of the Goths, Constantius.

The main sources for the career of Athaulf are Paulus Orosius, the chronicles of the Gallaecian bishop Hydatius, and those of Augustine's disciple, Prosper of Aquitaine.

== Declaration ==
The authenticity of Athaulf's declaration at Narbonne, as Orosius reported it in a rhetorical history that was explicitly written "against pagans" (it was completed in 417/18) has been doubted. Antonio Marchetta concludes that the words are indeed Athaulf's and distinguishes them from their interpretation by Orosius, who was preparing his readers for a conclusion that Christian times were felicitous and who attributed Athaulf's apparent change of heart to the power of his love for Galla Placidia, the instrument of divine intervention in God's plan for an eternal Roman Empire. Marchetta finds the marriage instead an act of hard-headed politics.

== See also ==
- Roman Civil war of 407–415

Athaulf Balti dynasty Died: 415
Regnal titles
Preceded by Segeric	King of the Visigoths; 411–415	Succeeded by Sigeric
