= Wallia =

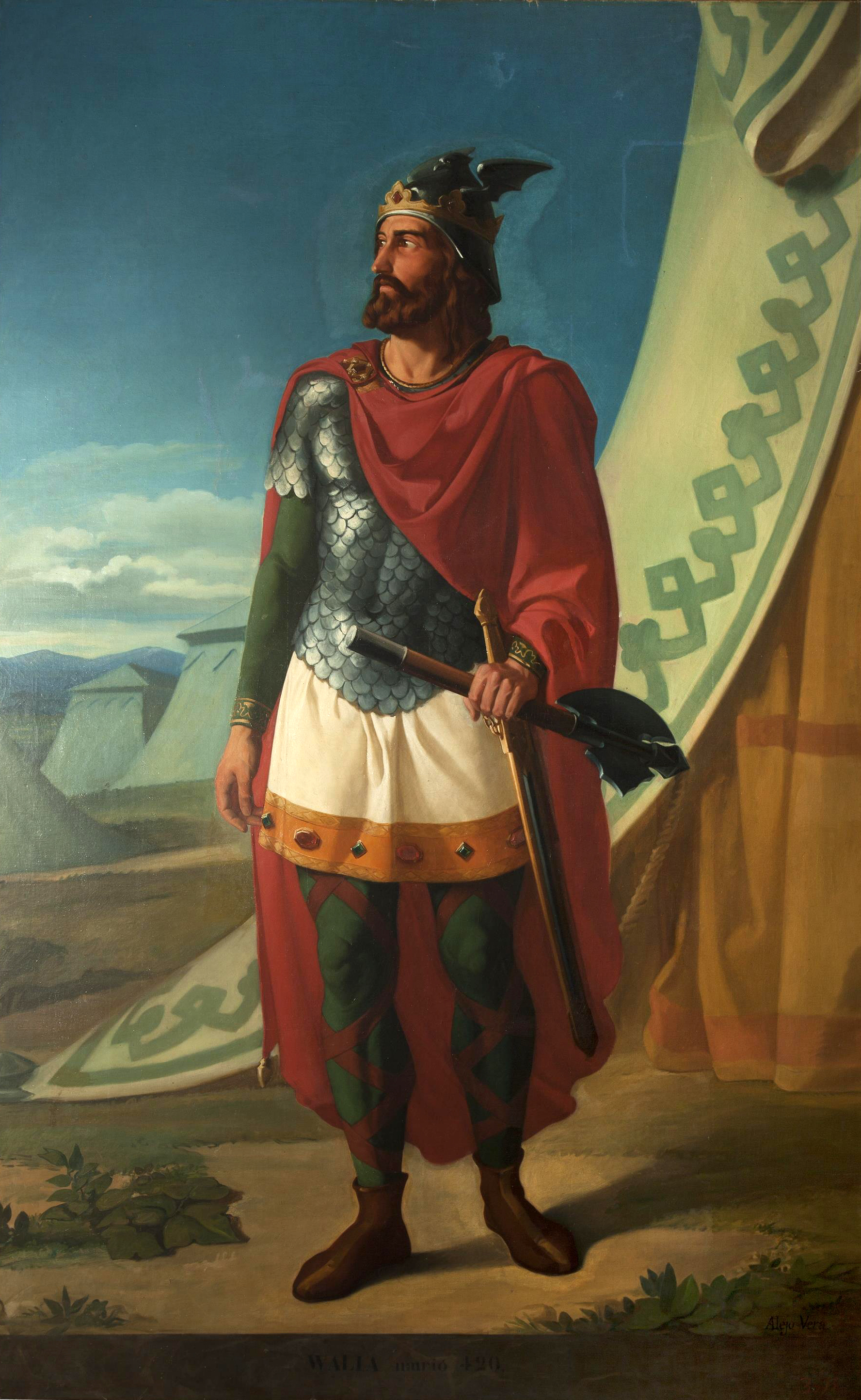
- Imagined image of Wallia painted in 1855

King of the Visigoths
- Reign: 415–418
- Predecessor: Sigeric
- Successor: Theodoric I
- Born: c. 385
- Died: 418
- Dynasty: Balti dynasty
- Father: Possibly Athanaric
- Mother: Rocestes

Wallia, Walha, or Vallia (Gothic: 𐍅𐌰𐌻𐌾𐌰𐌽, Spanish: Walia, Portuguese Vália), (c. 385 – 418) was king of the Visigoths from 415 to 418. He was elected to the throne after Visigothic Kings Athaulf and Sigeric were both assassinated in 415. One of Wallia's most notable achievements was negotiating an agreement with the Western Roman emperor Honorius in 416, under which the Visigoths provided military service to the Western Roman Empire. In 418, they were settled in Aquitania (a region in modern-day France), marking a significant step towards the eventual establishment of a Visigothic kingdom in the Iberian Peninsula. Wallia was succeeded by Theodoric I.

== Biography ==
Political intrigue preceded Wallia's ascension to power, for his Visigothic predecessor Athaulf—who married Galla Placidia in 414—was murdered by his followers who believed him to be a puppet to Roman interests. Athaulf's successor, Sigeric, ignored the Visigothic rights of procedure to military leadership and seemed to likewise acquiesce to the Romans; such perceptions among his people quickly led to his death in turn just seven days after assuming power. Wallia was chosen to replace Sigeric in 415, since the Visigoths were convinced he would end any peace negotiations with Rome undertaken by his forerunners. At the time, the Goths' main antagonist was Constantius, the magister militum of emperor Honorius.

Like his predecessor Alaric, Wallia attempted to take his Gothic forces to northern Africa but ultimately "foundered in the Sea of Gibraltar", a failure that precipitated his suing for peace. Subsequently, Wallia accepted a treaty offered by Honorius with the Roman Empire. Christian historian and theologian, Orosius, reported that the terms of the agreements made in 416 and 418 were very favorable for the Romans, (Note: The terms to Wallia's Goths must have still been reasonably generous, since the peace concluded with the Romans in 416 was replete with 600,000 bushels of grain.) including the return of Honorius' sister Galla Placidia to him. (Note: The original text from Orosius can be found in his Histories Against the Pagans (7.43, 10–13); see: https://www.attalus.org/translate/orosius7B.html) Whatever advantages won by Wallia in acquiring food for his forces via treaty with Rome, it was Constantius who exploited the situation by securing the return of emperor's sister, a move historian Michael Kulikowski termed, a route "into the imperial family".

Gothic war in Spain

Now operating in Roman service as foederati, Wallia and his Goths marched against the Alans and Vandals in both Baetica and Lusitania with "dramatic success". These exploits against the Asding Vandals and Alans were at the behest of Constantius. Between 417 and into 418, Wallia's Goths inflicted considerable defeats upon the Vandals and the Alans alike; even killing the Alan ruler, Addax. To this end, Roman writer and clergyman Hydatius recorded how Wallia, king of the Goths "in the name of Rome...inflicted a vast slaughter upon the barbarians in Spain". For whatever reason, Constantius recalled Wallia's Goths—historian Randers-Pehrson suggests that the magister militum was alarmed and fearful of their success—and then "settled them in southern Gaul." (Note: Historian Guy Halsall points out that although some sources contend these events occurred in 418, he indicates that the year was more likely 419, citing Prosper as a more reliable and contemporary account; Prosper even claimed that the settlement was not officially carried out until 419 under Wallia's successor, Theoderic.) Nonetheless, Wallia's Gothic federates were "assigned" the Garonne valley from "Toulouse to Bordeaux" and the coastal strip along the Atlantic from Les Landes at the foot of the Pyrenees mountains "to the Loire in the north". Despite his success, Wallia died before he was able to leave Spain.

== Other ==
Wallia's daughter was the mother of Ricimer and the mother-in-law of Gundowech, King of the Burgundians. Wallia is sometimes assumed to have been the historical model for the legendary figure of Walter of Aquitaine.

== Bibliography ==
- Albaigès, Josep María (1993). Diccionario de nombres de personas (in Spanish) (3 ed.). Barcelona: Publicacions de la Universitat de Barcelona. ISBN 978-84-475-0264-6.
- Burns, Thomas (1994). Barbarians within the Gates of Rome: A Study of Roman Military Policy and the Barbarians, CA. 375–425 A.D. Bloomington and Indianapolis: Indiana University Press. ISBN 978-0-25331-288-4.
- Halsall, Guy (2007). Barbarian Migrations and the Roman West, 376–568. Cambridge and New York: Cambridge University Press. ISBN 978-0-52143-543-7.
- Heather, Peter (1991). Goths and Romans, 332–489. Oxford: Clarendon Press. ISBN 978-0-19820-234-9.
- James, Edward (2014). Europe's Barbarians, AD 200–600. London and New York: Routledge. ISBN 978-0-58277-296-0.
- Kulikowski, Michael (2019). The Tragedy of Empire: From Constantine to the Destruction of Roman Italy. Cambridge, MA: The Belknap Press of Harvard University Press. ISBN 978-0-67466-013-7.
- Osborn, Marijane (2019). "A New Suggestion about Weland Be Wurman in Deor". The Journal of English and Germanic Philology. 118 (2): 157–176. doi:10.5406/jenglgermphil.118.2.0157.
- Randers-Pehrson, Justine D. (1993). Barbarians and Romans: The Birth Struggle of Europe, A.D. 400¬–700. Norman and London: University of Oklahoma Press. ISBN 978-0-80612-511-4.
- Thompson, E.A. (1982). Romans and Barbarians: The Decline of the Western Empire. Madison, WI: University of Wisconsin Press. ISBN 0-299-08700-X.
- Wolfram, Herwig (1988). History of the Goths. Berkeley and Los Angeles: University of California Press. ISBN 0-520-05259-5.

King Wallia of the Visigoths Balti dynasty Died: 418
Regnal titles
Preceded by Sigeric	King of the Visigoths; 415–418	Succeeded by Theodoric I
