= Publilia gens =

Ancient Roman family

The gens Publilia (Pūblilia), sometimes written Poblilia or Poplilia, was a plebeian family at ancient Rome. Members of this gens are first mentioned in the early decades of the Republic. The lex Publilia passed by Volero Publilius, tribune of the plebs in 471 BC, was an important milestone in the struggle between the patrician and plebeian orders. Although the Publilii appear throughout the history of the Republic, the family faded into obscurity around the time of the Samnite Wars, and never again achieved positions of prominence in the Roman state.

== Origin ==
The nomen Publilius is a patronymic surname based on the Latin praenomen Publius, with which it is frequently confused.

== Praenomina ==
The praenomina used by the Publilii included Volero, Lucius, Quintus, Gaius, and Titus. All were very common throughout Roman history, except for Volero; the Publilii were the only important family to make use of that name.

== Branches and cognomina ==
The only distinct family of the Publilii under the Republic bore the cognomen Philo, from the Greek "to love". One member of this family bore the additional surname Volscus, a Volscian, presumably for some deed involving the Volsci.

== Members ==
This list includes abbreviated praenomina. For an explanation of this practice, see filiation.

=== Publilii Philones ===
- Volero Publilius, a distinguished veteran, was ill-treated by the consuls of 473 BC, and after his plight became known he was elected one of the tribunes of the plebs. Two years later, he passed the lex Publilia, transferring the election of the tribunes from the comitia centuriata to the comitia tributa, and raising the number of tribunes to be elected each year from two to five.
- Lucius Publilius Vol. f. (Philo), son of the celebrated tribune of the plebs Volero Publilius, and father of the consular tribunes Lucius and Volero.
- Lucius Publilius L. f. Vol. n. Volscus Philo, consular tribune in 400 BC.
- Volero Publilius L. f. Vol. n. Philo, consular tribune in 399 BC.
- Quintus Publilius Philo, the grandfather of Quintus Publilius Philo, consul four times during the period of the Samnite Wars.
- Quintus Publilius Q. f. Philo, the father of Quintus Publilius Philo, four times consul.
- Quintus Publilius Q. f. Q. n. Philo, consul in 339 BC, defeated the Latins, and received a triumph. The same year, he was nominated dictator, and secured the passage of the leges Publiliae, further increasing the political equality of the plebeians. He was the first plebeian praetor in 335, magister equitum in 335, and censor in 332. Consul a second time in 327, he laid siege to Palaepolis, which he captured as the first proconsul in 326, triumphing for the second time. In his third consulship, BC 320, he defeated a Samnite army to rescue the army of his colleague. He was consul a fourth time in 315.
- Lucius Publilius Philo, quaestor circa 102 BC; his nomen is uncertain, and might be Veturius.

=== Others ===
- Quintus Publilius, one of the triumviri mensarii appointed in 352 BC.
- Gaius Publilius, a young man who became a nexus to secure his father's debts. He was ill-treated by the creditor, Lucius Papirius, whose scandalous behaviour led to the passage of the lex Poetelia Papiria of 326 BC, abolishing debt bondage for nexi.
- Titus Publilius, one of the first plebeians to become augur following the passage of the lex Ogulnia in 300 BC, permitting plebeians to hold the position.
- Gaius Publilius, quaestor in 146 BC, issued coins under the orders of the consul Lucius Mummius in Macedonia.
- Publilia, the second wife of Cicero. When they were divorced in 45 BC, Cicero was at some pains to negotiate the repayment of her dowry.
- Publilius, Cicero's brother-in-law, with whom the orator was forced to negotiate for the repayment of his wife's dowry.
- Publilius, a comic poet, of whom a single line is quoted by Nonius. He might perhaps be the same person as Publilius Syrus.
- Publilius Syrus, sometimes found as Publius Syrus, a freedman, who gained fame at Rome by writing and acting in popular pantomimes. He was also the author of a number of sententiae, a collection of maxims, proverbs, and aphorisms.
- Lucius Publilius Celsus, consul suffectus in 102, and consul ordinarius in 115; executed by Hadrian in 118.
- Publilius Optatianus signo Porfyrius, a poet, and praefectus urbi of Rome in 329 and 333.

== See also ==
- List of Roman gentes

== Bibliography ==
- Marcus Tullius Cicero, Epistulae ad Atticum.
- Diodorus Siculus, Bibliotheca Historica (Library of History).
- Dionysius of Halicarnassus, Romaike Archaiologia.
- Titus Livius (Livy), History of Rome.
- Marcus Velleius Paterculus, Compendium of Roman History.
- Valerius Maximus, Factorum ac Dictorum Memorabilium (Memorable Facts and Sayings).
- Cassius Dio, Roman History.
- Barthold Georg Niebuhr, The History of Rome, Julius Charles Hare and Connop Thirlwall, trans., John Smith, Cambridge (1828).
- Dictionary of Greek and Roman Biography and Mythology, William Smith, ed., Little, Brown and Company, Boston (1849).
- George Davis Chase, "The Origin of Roman Praenomina", in Harvard Studies in Classical Philology, vol. VIII (1897).
- T. Robert S. Broughton, The Magistrates of the Roman Republic, American Philological Association (1952).
