= Vandalic language =

Extinct Germanic language of the Vandals

Vandalic
- Native to: Spain, North Africa
- Ethnicity: Vandals
- Extinct: 6th century AD
- Language family: Indo-European: Germanic; East; Vandalic

Language codes
- ISO 639-3: xvn
- Glottolog: vand1245

Vandalic was the Germanic language spoken by the Vandals during roughly the 3rd to 6th centuries. It was probably closely related to Gothic, and, as such, is traditionally classified as an East Germanic language. Its attestation is very fragmentary, mainly due to the Vandals' constant migrations and late adoption of writing. All modern sources from the time when Vandalic was spoken are protohistoric.

== Classification ==
Vandalic is traditionally classified as an East Germanic language, though the reasons for this classification are mostly historical and not linguistic. Due to the perception of Vandalic as an East Germanic language, its reconstruction from onomastics recorded by Greek and Roman sources relies on Gothic forms. Therefore, it is difficult to assess whether or not Vandalic is closely related to Gothic.

Theories include that Vandalic together with Gothic and Burgundian formed a dialect continuum; that the language of the Vandals was actually Gothic; and that they were different languages that separated early on, without having an intermediary East Germanic ancestor.

== History ==
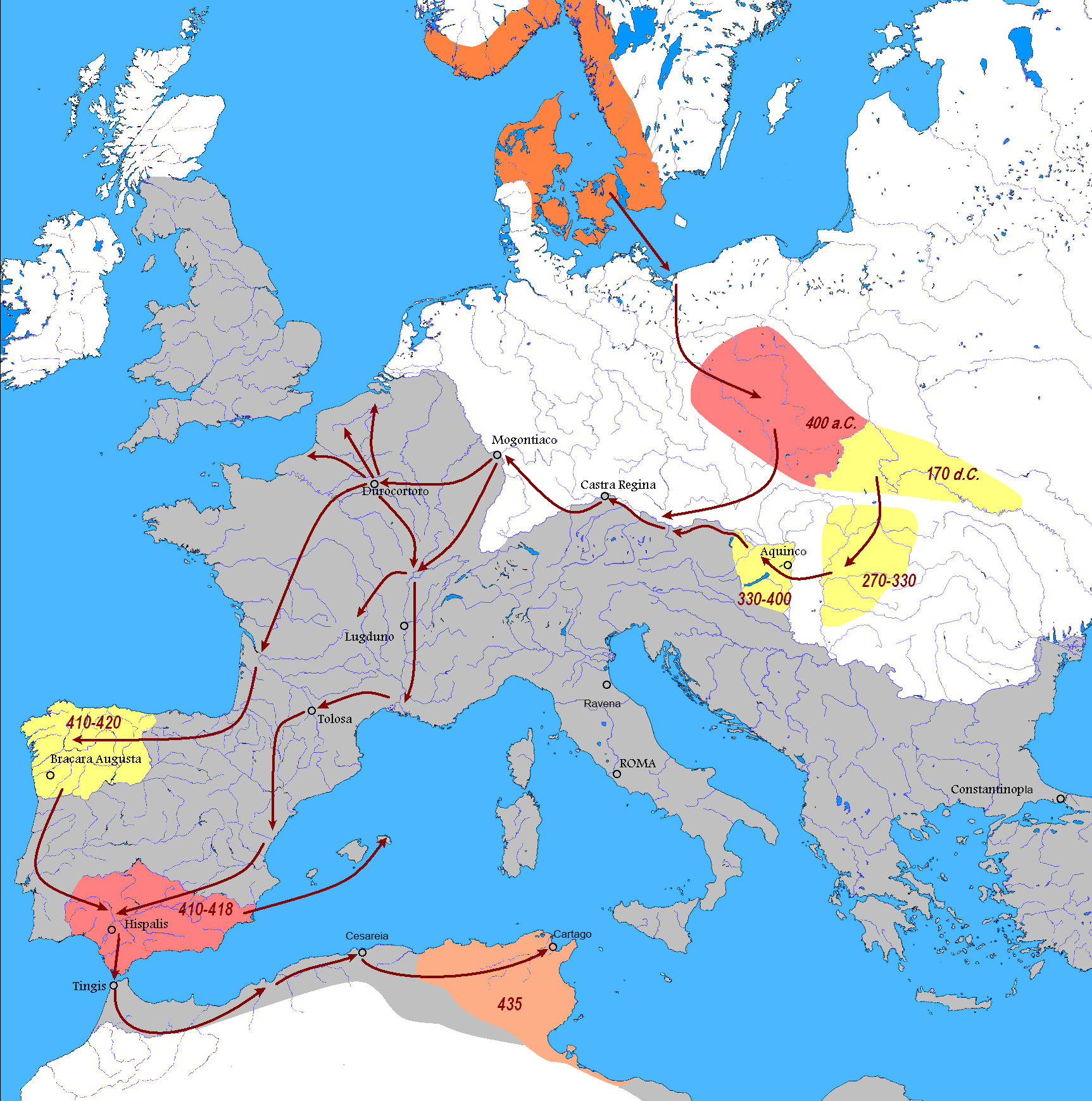
The Vandals during the Migration Period

The linguistic urheimat of Vandalic probably lies south of the Baltic sea. The Vandals were first mentioned by Roman authors in the first century, and examples given of Vandal peoples by Pliny the Elder included the Warini, who are believed based on the account of Tacitus to have lived near the Baltic coast of what is now Germany, and the Gutones and Burgundiones, who are believed based on the accounts of Tacitus and Ptolemy to have lived somewhere near the Lower Vistula river in this period.

The Hasdingi, whose ruling dynasty later ruled the Vandals in Iberia, and then in northern Africa, first appear in Roman records in the late second century, when they moved into the region of Dacia, and according to later accounts they later moved to the Roman border on the Danube. The Silingi, who were also part of the Vandal kingdom, were described by Ptolemy in the second century as living near the Elbe in what is now eastern Germany.

According to the 6th-century account of Procopius, the Vandals of his time spoke the same language as the Goths and Gepids, and were effectively a part of the same people, who he believed had originally lived in what is now Russia. Another 6th-century writer, Jordanes, claimed that the Goths and Gepids originally came from Scandinavia. It is however debated whether Gothic, and by extension Vandalic, really came from Scandinavia, and linguistic evidence shows no specific relation between North Germanic and either Gothic or Vandalic.

The Hasdingi and Silingi Vandals crossed the Rhine in about 406, together with Alans and Suebi, and these peoples established short-lived kingdoms within Roman Iberia. Under pressure from Roman and Visigothic forces they subsequently moved to North Africa in the 430s. Their kingdom flourished in the early 6th century, but after their defeat in 534 they were placed under Byzantine administration. The Vandalic language is presumed to still have been spoken at the time of the Byzantine conquest. It likely disappeared before the end of the century.

== Attestation ==
Very little is confidently known about the Vandalic language, other than various phrases and a small number of personal names of Vandalic origin, mainly known from documents and coins. Most Vandalic names were recorded by native speakers of Latin or Greek, who might have misinterpreted phonemes or assimilated names to those common in their mother tongue.

The regional name Andalusia is traditionally believed to have derived from Vandalic, although this claim is contested. Following the Umayyad conquest of Hispania, from the 8th century to the end of the 15th the region was called al-Andalus.

In one inscription from the Vandal Kingdom, the Christian incantation of Kyrie eleison ("Lord, have mercy!") is given in Vandalic as "Froia arme". The same phrase appears in Collatio Beati Augustini cum Pascentio ariano 15 by Pseudo-Augustine: "Froja armes". It is possible that this sentence is, in fact, Gothic, since the Vandals might have used Gothic as liturgical language.

The epigram De conviviis barbaris in the Latin Anthology, of North African origin and disputed date, contains a fragment in a Germanic language that some authors believe to be Vandalic, although the fragment itself refers to the language as "Gothic". This may be because both languages were East Germanic and closely related; scholars have pointed out in this context that Procopius refers to the Goths, Vandals, Visigoths, and Gepids as "Gothic nations" and opines that they "are all of the Arian faith, and have one language called Gothic". The fragment reads:

Inter "eils" Goticum "scapia matzia ia drincan!"
non audet quisquam dignos educere versus.
Calliope madido trepidat se iungere Baccho.
ne pedibus non stet ebria Musa suis.

Translation:

Amid the Gothic "Hail! Let's get [something to] eat and drink"
nobody dares to put forth decent verses.
Calliope hurries to depart from wet Bacchus.
An inebriated Muse may not stand on her feet.

Other surviving Vandalic words are Baudus ("master"), and Vandalirice ("King of the Vandals").

== Phonology ==
The phonological features of Vandalic are similar to those of Gothic.

=== Vowels ===
The following vowel inventory is based on Wrede:

	Front		Central		Back	
	short	long	short	long	short	long
High	i	iː			u	uː
Mid		eː				oː
Low			a			

- Vandalic /i/ was sometimes written ⟨e⟩ by Latin authors.

The Proto-Germanic long vowel */e:/ is often written in Vandalic names as ⟨e⟩ (Gunthimer, Geilimer), but it is also represented as ⟨i⟩ Geilamir, Vitarit.

The Proto-Germanic short vowel */e/ is often written as ⟨i⟩ in Vandalic when it was not followed by */r, h, w/. For example, Sigisteus contains -i because g comes after the vowel, but Beremut retains the *e since r comes after the vowel. It could either mean that */e/ turned into /i/ in Vandalic or that the Vandalic short /e/ was interpreted as /i/ by non-natives.

Similar to Gothic, Vandalic does not seem to have i-umlaut. One example of items that demonstrate the lack of umlaut are names that contain the form *ari (< Proto-Germanic *harjaz 'army'): Ariarith, Arifridos, Guntari, Raginari vs. Old English here, the latter of which does show umlaut with the Proto-Germanic *a having shifted to e.

Proto-Germanic */o:/ is written ⟨u⟩; Blumarit (compare Proto-Germanic *blōmô), Vilimut. This could either mean that */o:/ turned into /u/ in Vandalic or that it is a misinterpretation of the sound by Latin authors. In Gothic documents, */o:/ is mostly written ⟨o⟩, but sometimes also ⟨u⟩.

The Proto-Germanic diphthong *eu tends to come down to Vandalic as eu. Take for example the form teudo- ('people'), as opposed to the Gothic 𐌸𐌹𐌿𐌳𐌰 (þiuda), where it has changed to /iu/.

The Proto-Germanic diphthong *ai is preserved as /ai/, but tends to become /ei/ later on. For example, the name Gaisericus changes to Geiseric in later documents.

=== Consonants ===
The Vandalic consonant inventory according to Wrede.

	Labial		Dental		Alveolar		Palatal		Velar		Labiovelar	Glottal
Nasal		m ⟨m⟩				n ⟨n⟩			ŋ ⟨ng⟩			
Stop	p ⟨p⟩	b ⟨b⟩			t ⟨t⟩	d ⟨d⟩	c ⟨c⟩	ɟ ⟨g⟩	k ⟨c⟩	ɡ ⟨g⟩		
Fricative	ɸ ⟨f⟩	β ⟨b⟩	θ ⟨th⟩	ð ⟨d⟩	s ⟨s⟩	z ⟨s, z⟩			x ⟨h?⟩	(ɣ) ⟨g?⟩		h ⟨h?⟩
Approximant					l ⟨l⟩		j ⟨i, j⟩				w ⟨w, v⟩	
Trill					r ⟨r⟩							

- It is unclear how ⟨h⟩ was originally pronounced.
- It is likely that [ɣ] occurred in Vandalic, but there is not enough evidence for the sound.

The Proto-Germanic */z/ is also preserved in the language as a sibilant (always found written ⟨s⟩ or as part of ⟨x⟩), as opposed to having undergone rhotacism as it has in North or West Germanic. For example, compare the Vandalic form geis (as in Geiseric) 'spear' to Old English gār.

The word-initial /h/ inherited from Proto-Germanic does not consistently appear in Vandalic names recorded by Greek or Latin authors (e.g., the element ari in Arifridos and Guntari, from Proto-Germanic *harja- 'army'). Sometimes the same name appears with and without ⟨h⟩, depending on the author. However, royal names on Vandal coins use a conservative official spelling, with the ⟨h⟩ always being written. This could point to either a loss of the sound represented by ⟨h⟩ or errors introduced by authors unfamiliar with the sound.

The Proto-Germanic fricatives */θ/ and */ð/ often turned into /t/ or /d/, but there are also some names in which they were retained or otherwise represented distinctly: Thrasamundus, Guntha.

Initial /w/ is sometimes written as ⟨gu⟩. This could be an issue of Latin spelling or a point to the development of /gw/. Examples are Guiliaruna, < Proto-Germanic *wilja- and Guitifrida, < *wīti-.

The Proto-Germanic cluster */-ww-/ can be found strengthened to /-g-/.

The Proto-Germanic cluster */-tj-/ can become [tsj], as in matzia from Proto-Germanic *matjaną.

== Grammar ==
Very little is known about Vandalic grammar, but some things can be extracted from extant Vandalic material.

=== Morphology ===
The original Proto-Germanic *-z used to mark the nominative masculine singular in nominals, which was lost in West Germanic early on, is attested within some preserved Vandalic forms as -s or as part of -x (occasionally found Romanized in some name attestations as -us). This marker is potentially to be deemed an archaic feature since it is lost in most words, with complete loss in Ostrogothic names from the 6th century onward.

The epithet Vandalirice 'king of the Vandals' gives possible attestation of a genitive plural ending -e (cf. Gothic -ē), albeit written as ⟨i⟩ within this form. Old Germanic languages outside of East Germanic have -a (as in Old English and Old Norse) or -o (as in Old Dutch or Old High German) as their equivalents of this ending instead; compare Old English Wendla against the potential Vandalic form *Vandali.

== Vocabulary ==
The tables below show various Vandalic words, phrases and forms that survive in (or as) names and various Latin texts. The majority of these were taken from Nicoletta Francovich Onesti.

Vandalic words attested outside of names
Attested Vandalic form	Gothic cognate	Gloss of Vandalic form
arme	𐌰𐍂𐌼𐌰𐌹 (armai) (2.sg.ipv. form of 𐌰𐍂𐌼𐌰𐌽 (arman))	'have mercy!'
baudus (cf. -baudes)	—	'ruler, master'
drincan	𐌳𐍂𐌹𐌲𐌺𐌰𐌽 (drigkan)	'drink (inf.)'
eils	𐌷𐌰𐌹𐌻𐍃 (hails)	'hail!' (greeting)
ia	𐌾𐌰𐌷 (jah)	'and'
froia	𐍆𐍂𐌰𐌿𐌾𐌰 (frauja)	'lord, (the) Lord'
matzia	𐌼𐌰𐍄𐌾𐌰𐌽 (matjan)	'eat (inf.), have one's meal (inf.)'
scapia	*𐍃𐌺𐌰𐍀𐌾𐌰𐌽 (*skapjan), cf. 𐌲𐌰𐍃𐌺𐌰𐍀𐌾𐌰𐌽 (gaskapjan)	'make, create'
vandalirice	— (-𐍂𐌴𐌹𐌺𐌴 (reikē))	'king of the Vandals'

Vandalic words and forms attested in or as personal names
Attested Vandalic form(s)	Gothic cognate	Proto-Germanic etymon	Old English cognate	Gloss of Vandalic form
ari	𐌷𐌰𐍂𐌾𐌹𐍃 (harjis)	*harjaz	here	'army'
baudes (cf. baudus)	—	*baudiz	—	'master, ruler'
bere	𐌱𐌰𐌹𐍂𐌰- (baira-)	*bera-	bera-	'bear, carry'
bluma	𐌱𐌻𐍉𐌼𐌰 (blōma)	*blōmô	*blōma	'bloom, flower'
dagila	*𐌳𐌰𐌲𐌹𐌻𐌰 (*dagila) cf. 𐌳𐌰𐌲𐍃 (dags)	*dag-	(dæġ)	'day (dim.)'
frida frede feua	*𐍆𐍂𐌹𐌸𐌿𐍃 (*friþus)	*friþu-	friþ(u) (cf. MnE †frith)	'peace'
geis	*𐌲𐌰𐌹𐍃 (*gais)	*gaiza-	gār (cf. MnE garlic)	'spear'
gunda guntha	—	*gunþjo	gūþ	'battle'
hildi-, -ild	𐌷𐌹𐌻𐌳𐌹- (hildi-)	*hildjō	hild	'battle'
mir mer	*𐌼𐌴𐍂𐍃 (*mērs)	*mēraz, *mērijaz	mǣre (cf. MnE ‡mere)	'famous'
munds	—	*mundō	mund (cf. MnE ‡mound)	'defender'
mut	𐌼𐍉𐌸𐍃 (mōþs) ('mood, anger')	*moda-	mōd (cf. MnE mood)	'courage'
oa	𐌷𐌰𐌿𐌷𐍃 (hauhs)	*hauha-	hēah	'high'
osta hostra	*𐌰𐌿𐍃𐍄𐍂𐌰- (*austra-)	*austra-	ēast	'east'
rit rith	-𐍂𐌴𐌳𐌰𐌽 (-rēdan) ('to advise')	*rēdaz	rǣd, rēd (cf. MnE †rede)	'advice, counsel'
rix ricus	𐍂𐌴𐌹𐌺𐍃 (reiks)	*rīk-	rice ('dominion')	'king'
runa	𐍂𐌿𐌽𐌰 (rūna)	*rūnō	rūn (cf. MnE †roun, rune)	'secret'
scarila	—	*skarō	scearu (cf. MnE share)	'band (dim.)'
sifila	𐍃𐌹𐌱𐌾𐌰 (sibja)	*sibjō	sibb (cf. MnE sibling)	'kindred (dim.)'
sindi-	𐍃𐌹𐌽𐌸𐍃 (sinþs) ('time, occurrence')	*sinþa-	sīþ (cf. MnE send)	'travel, path'
trioua	𐍄𐍂𐌹𐌲𐌲𐍅𐌰 (triggwa)	*triwwa	trīewu	'loyal, true (f.)'
teus	𐌸𐌹𐌿𐍃 (þius)	*þewaz	þēow (cf. MnE †thew)	'slave, servant'
theudo	𐌸𐌹𐌿𐌳𐌰 (þiuda)	*þeudō	þēod (cf. MnE †thede)	'folk'
vili, guilia	𐍅𐌹𐌻𐌾𐌰 (wilja)	*wiljô	willa	'will (noun)'
uit- guit-	*𐍅𐌴𐌹𐍄𐌹- (*weiti-)	*wīti-	—	'struggle, combat'
vult	𐍅𐌿𐌻𐌸𐌿𐍃 (wulþus)	*wulþu-	wuldor	'glory'

== Writing system ==
The few names on coins issued by the Vandalic kingdom were written in Latin script.

== See also ==
- Vandals
- Gothic language
- East Germanic languages
- Languages of the Roman Empire
