= Laberia gens =

Ancient Roman family

The gens Laberia was a minor plebeian family at ancient Rome. Members of this gens are first mentioned in the second century BC, at which time they held senatorial rank. Most of the members mentioned later were equites, but toward end of the first century AD they attained the consulship, which several of them held throughout the second century.

== Origin ==
As the Laberii first appear in the latter part of the Republic, and then as a relatively obscure family, there are no surviving stories or legends about their origin; nor do they bear any surnames that might point to a non-Latin origin. Chase mentions a common Roman surname, Labeo, deriving from labrum, and referring to someone with thick or prominent lips; but he does not connect it with the origin of any gentilicia. The nomen Laberius belongs to a class of gentilicia formed with relatively uncommon suffixes, which never became widely distributed; it resembles nomina such as Numerius, Papirius, and Valerius, nomina belonging to old Latin or Sabine families, which originally ended in -esius, gradually weakening to -erius during the period of archaic Latin, in the early or middle Republic.

== Praenomina ==
The main praenomina of the Laberii were Lucius and Quintus, two of the most common names in every period of Roman history. Some of the Laberii bore more distinctive names, including Decimus and Manius, perhaps given to younger children in the gens. The ubiquitous praenomen Gaius appears among the Laberii of the second century.

== Branches and cognomina ==
The earliest Laberii mentioned in history bear no surname. The first which appears is Durus, borne by one of Caesar's military tribunes, which translates as "hardy" or "tough", and belongs to an abundant class of cognomina derived from the character of an individual. This may have been a personal surname, as it was not passed down to any of the other Laberii known to history.

The only distinct family of the Laberii bore the cognomen Maximus, literally meaning "very great" or "greatest", a common surname throughout Roman history. Although it belonged to the most illustrious branch of this family, it may originally have designated the line descending from the eldest son, rather than portending "future greatness". At least four generations of this family are known, beginning with Lucius Laberius Maximus, aedile at Lanuvium in the mid-first century. Some of the later consuls of the Laberia gens may also have been descendants of this family, although they bore other surnames, including Priscus, which could mean "old", "elder", or "old-fashioned", and Quartinus, a diminutive of quartus, "a fourth", likely referring to a younger child.

== Members ==
This list includes abbreviated praenomina. For an explanation of this practice, see filiation.

- Quintus Laberius L. f., a senator in 129 BC.
- Decimus Laberius, an eques, celebrated as a writer of mimes. Caesar offered him 500,000 sestertii to appear on the stage at his triumphal games in 45 BC; Laberius complied, but took advantage of the opportunity to beard the dictator, and spar verbally with Cicero, and with his rival, Publilius Syrus.
- Laberius, a poet mentioned by Martial, who might be the same as the comedic writer.
- Quintus Laberius Durus, a military tribune, fell in battle during Caesar's second expedition to Britain.
- Laberius Maximus, procurator of Judea in AD 73 and 74, during the reign of Vespasian. Following the destruction of Jerusalem, Laberius was ordered to offer all the lands of Judea for sale. He may the same Laberius Maximus whom Trajan banished.
- Lucius Laberius Maximus, an aedile at Lanuvium, and father of Lucius Laberius Maximus, the praetorian prefect.
- Lucius Laberius L. f. Maximus, equestrian governor of Egypt in AD 83, and subsequently praetorian prefect. His son, Manius, was the first of the Laberii to attain the consulship.
- Quintus Laberius L. f. Justus Cocceius Lepidus, (Note: In his study of Roman nomenclature, Salomies presents a hypothetical stemma, showing how Laberius might have been descended from two distinct families, the Laberii and the Cocceii.) proconsul of Cyprus in AD 100.
- Lucius Laberius L. f. L. n., consul suffectus in AD 89, and consul ordinarius in 103; he was the son of Lucius Laberius Maximus, the praetorian prefect, and the father of Laberia Crispina.
- Laberia M'. f. L. n. Hostilia Crispina, heiress and wife of Gaius Bruttius Praesens, consul in AD 139.
- Gaius Laberius Priscus, consul suffectus in AD 142.
- Quintus Laberius Licinianus, consul suffectus in AD 144.
- Gaius Laberius Priscus, consul suffectus in AD 150.
- Gaius Laberius Quartinus, consul suffectus around AD 173.

== See also ==
- List of Roman gentes

== Bibliography ==
- Marcus Tullius Cicero, Epistulae ad Familiares.
- Gaius Julius Caesar, Commentarii de Bello Gallico (Commentaries on the Gallic War).
- Quintus Horatius Flaccus, Satirae.
- Lucius Annaeus Seneca, Controversiae.
- Lucius Annaeus Seneca, De Ira (On Anger).
- Flavius Josephus, Bellum Judaïcum (The Jewish War).
- Gaius Suetonius Tranquillus, De Vita Caesarum (Lives of the Caesars, or The Twelve Caesars).
- Marcus Valerius Martialis (Martial), Epigrammata (Epigrams).
- Aelius Lampridius, Aelius Spartianus, Flavius Vopiscus, Julius Capitolinus, Trebellius Pollio, and Vulcatius Gallicanus, Historia Augusta (Augustan History).
- Ambrosius Theodosius Macrobius, Saturnalia.
- Paulus Orosius, Historiarum Adversum Paganos (History Against the Pagans).
- Eusebius Sophronius Hieronymus (St. Jerome), In Chronicon Eusebii (The Chronicon of Eusebius).
- Dictionary of Greek and Roman Biography and Mythology, William Smith, ed., Little, Brown and Company, Boston (1849).
- George Davis Chase, "The Origin of Roman Praenomina", in Harvard Studies in Classical Philology, vol. VIII, pp. 103–184 (1897).
- Robert K. Sherk, "The Text of the Senatus Consultum De Agro Pergameno", in Greek, Roman, and Byzantine Studies, vol. 7, pp. 361–369 (1966).
- Géza Alföldy, Konsulat und Senatorenstand unter der Antonien (The Consulate and Senatorial State under the Antonines), Rudolf Habelt, Bonn (1977).
- Olli Salomies, Adoptive and Polyonymous Nomenclature in the Roman Empire, Societas Scientiarum Fennica, Helsinki (1992).
- John C. Traupman, The New College Latin & English Dictionary, Bantam Books, New York (1995).
- Werner Eck, "Die Fasti consulares der Regierungszeit des Antoninus Pius, eine Bestandsaufnahme seit Géza Alföldys Konsulat und Senatorenstand" (The Consular Fasti for the Reign of Antoninus Pius: an Inventory since Géza Alföldy's Konsulat und Senatorenstand), in Studia Epigraphica in Memoriam Géza Alföldy, Werner Eck, Bence Fehér, Péter Kovács, eds., Bonn, pp. 69–90 (2013).
