= Publilian laws =

Ancient Roman set of laws

The Publilian Laws are a set of laws which increased the amount of political power the plebeian order held in the Roman Republic. The laws are named for Volero Publilius and Quintus Publilius Philo, the two plebeian tribunes responsible for getting the laws passed.

== Lex Publilia (471 BC) ==
The lex Publilia introduced by the tribune Volero Publilius and passed in 471 BC, gave the power to elect tribunes to the Tribal Assembly rather than the Centuriate Assembly. This law gave plebeians the right to initiate laws. Publilius also saw that the Tribal Assembly should be organized by district, with each district casting a single vote decided by the majority within that district. The four Servian districts were limited to the city (tribus urbanae), and the land conquered after the Servian period was divided into sixteen districts (tribus rusticae). A twenty-first district, called Crustuminian was created in the place that the Plebeians organized themselves in order to have an uneven number of districts and avoid ties.

== Lex Publilia (339 BC) ==
The consul Quintus Publilius Philo is credited with passing three more laws to the benefit of plebeians in 339 BC, which are as follows:

1. A law stating that one censor must be a plebeian.
2. A law limiting the role of the comitia curiata to the ratification of proposals to be submitted to the comitia centuriata.
3. A law binding all the people of Rome to decisions made by the plebeian assembly.

Although there is little to no dispute that Philo is responsible for the first two of these laws, the third appears to be a duplicate of a later measure passed in 287–286 BC by Q. Hortensius, and is considered fictitious by some.

== See also ==
- Publilia gens
