= Astronomia =

Astronomia may refer to:

== Astronomy ==
- De astronomia, a book of stories composed sometime in classical antiquity
- Astronomia nova, Johannes Kepler's 1609 astronomical book on the motion of Mars
- Astronomia Danica, a 1622 astronomical work by Longomontanus
- 1154 Astronomia, an asteroid discovered in 1927
- Astronomia.pl, a Polish website launched in 2001

== Other uses ==
- Astronomia (poem), an Ancient Greek poem, with an astronomical focus
- "Astronomia" (song), a 2010 electronic dance track by Tony Igy
  - "Astronomia" (Vicetone remix), a 2014 remix of the track by Vicetone

== See also ==
- Astronomica (disambiguation)
