= De conviviis barbaris =

De conviviis barbaris or De convivis barbaris (Latin for "On banquets of barbarians" or "On barbarian guests") is an epigram preserved in the Codex Salmasianus (Paris, Bibliothèque Nationale de France, Codex Parisinus Latinus, 10318) of the Latin Anthology, copied in Italy c. 800 AD. It is noted for containing a few words in a Germanic language that historians believe to be Gothic or Vandalic: in either case, this makes it a rare attestation of East Germanic from late antiquity.

== Origins and language ==
The poem's date of composition is unknown, but postulated to be penned between the sixth and eighth century AD. Although the text states that it is referring to Goths per se, several features mark the Germanic words as Vandalic, and it is likely that the text simply uses the term 'Gothic' loosely: correspondingly, Procopius refers to the Goths, Vandals, Visigoths, and Gepids as "Gothic nations" and opines that they "are all of the Arian faith, and have one language called Gothic".

== Text ==
Translation of the Germanic words in the epigram is disputed, but the text means something like:

Inter "eils" Goticum "scapia matzia ia drincan!"
non audet quisquam dignos edicere versus.
Calliope madido trepidat se iungere Baccho.
ne pedibus non stet ebria Musa suis.

Translation:

Amid the Gothic "Hail! Let's get [something to] eat and drink"
nobody dares to put forth decent verses.
Calliope hurries to depart from tipsy Bacchus.
A drunken Muse may not stand on her feet.

== Metre ==
There is no doubt that the text is hexametrical, although there has been dispute about the scansion. One likely interpretation is thus:

Īntĕr "ĕ|īls" Gŏtĭ|cūm "scăpĭ|ā mătzĭ|ā iā | drīncăn!"
nōn āu|dēt quīs|quām dīg|nōs ē|dīcĕrĕ|vērsūs.
Cāllĭŏ|pē mădĭ|dō trĕpĭ|dāt sē | iūngĕrĕ | Bācchō.
nē pĕdĭ|būs nōn | stēt || ēbrĭă | Mūsă sŭ|īs.
