= Pentadius (poet) =

Pentadius' long and serpentine epigram on Narcissus. His name is in red at the top.

Pentadius was a Latin poet of Late Antiquity. Two elegies and four epigrams are ascribed to him in the Anthologia Salmasiana.

== Date and identity ==
Pentadius was a North African, probably resident in Carthage. He was seemingly a Christian. His life is usually dated to the 3rd or 4th century AD. What can be said with certainty is that he was active before 534, when the Anthologia was compiled. He has often been identified with the Pentadius to whom Lactantius dedicated the epitome of his Divine Institutions in 320. Paola Paolucci, on the other hand, proposed to identify the poet with the Bishop Pentadius who attended the Council of Carthage in 416 and is mentioned in Pope Innocent I's letter of that year. His diocese was probably Carpi and he may have had Pelagian sympathies. Two other educated 5th-century Africans with of the name are known: the Pentadius who was governor of Egypt in 404 and corresponded with Synesius of Cyrene, who attests to his learning; and Pentadius, the nephew of Vindicianus Afer and dedicatee of a Latin translation of a Hippocratic work.

== Poetry ==
Pentadius' works are preserved under his own name in four manuscripts, the earliest being the Codex Salmasianus of about 800 followed by the 9th-century Codex Thuaneus and Codex Vossianus Lat. Q 86. Only one of his epigrams is copied under his name in Codex Parisinus Lat. 8069, but it is found in other manuscript under other attributions (including to Cicero).

In the Shackleton Bailey edition of the Latin Anthology, Pentadius' epigrams are numbers 259–262 while the elegies De Fortuna and De adventu veris are 226 and 227, respectively. Pentadius elegies are "echoic" or "serpentine" in form. In each elegiac couplet, the first half of the first line (the hexameter) is repeated at the end of the following pentameter. This technique or device (epanalepsis) was used sparingly by Ovid, whom Pentadius imitates.

There is some uncertainty regarding the authorship of epigrams 260–262. Epanalepsis is found in the first of two epigrams on Narcissus, but not in the second, nor in the other two epigrams. Paolucci accepts their authenticity. The epigram De femina is misogynistic. It was transmitted independently, sometimes under the name of Ovid or Petronius. The epigram on an otherwise unknown Chrysokome was probably based on the account of Claudia Quinta in Ovid's Fasti.

The Anonymi versus serpentini, epigrams 25–68 of the Latin Anthology, may show Pentadian influence. At least fourteen anonymous poems have been ascribed to Pentadius, the bulk of these later attributions coming from the 16th and 17th centuries. They do not have general acceptance.

Pentadius' poetry has been translated into English.

== Works cited ==
- Arcaz Pozo, Juan Luis (2017). "Review of Paolucci 2016". Exemplaria Classica. 21: 395–398.
- Duff, John Wright; Duff, Arnold Mackay, eds. (1934). Minor Latin Poets. William Heinemann.
- Lausberg, Marion (2006). "Pentadius". Brill's New Pauly Online. Brill. doi:10.1163/1574-9347_bnp_e913050.
- Paolucci, Paola, ed. (2016). Pentadius Ovidian Poet: Music, Myth and Love. Weidmann.
- Scourfield, J. H. D. (2012). "Pentadius". In Simon Hornblower; Antony Spawforth; Esther Eidinow (eds.). The Oxford Classical Dictionary (4th ed.). Oxford University Press.
