= Stonehenge (Dublin, New Hampshire) =

Historic house in New Hampshire, United States

- U.S. National Register of Historic Places
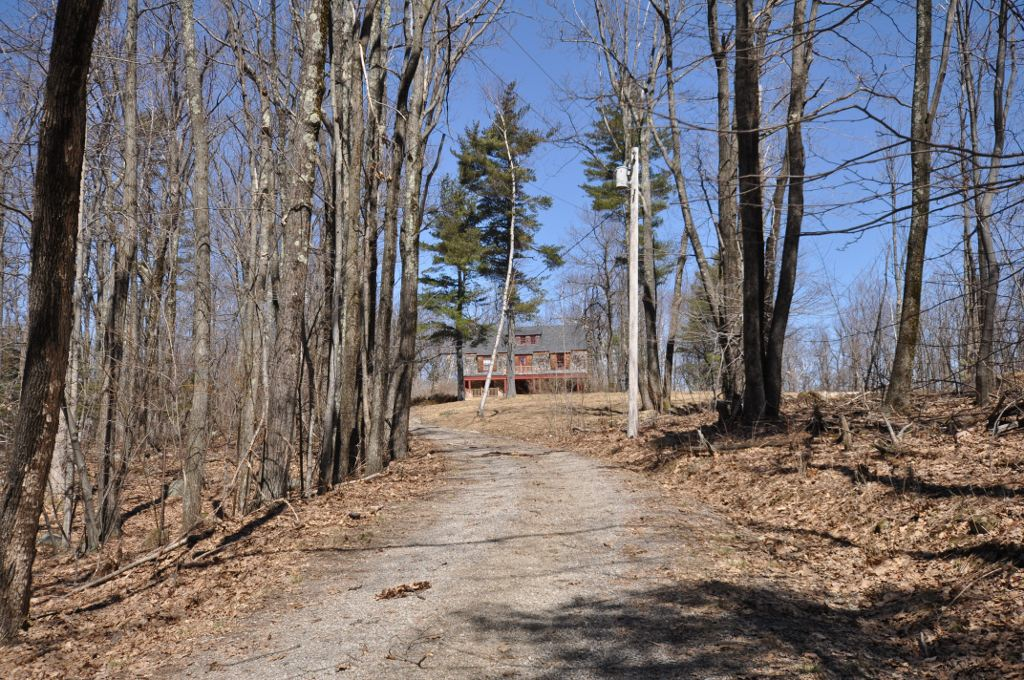

- Location within New Hampshire Location within the United States
- Location: Windmill Hill Rd., Dublin, New Hampshire
- Coordinates: 42°53′41″N 72°3′1″W
- Area: 0.6 acres (0.24 ha)
- Built: 1889
- Architectural style: Shingle Style
- MPS: Dublin MRA
- NRHP reference No.: 83004079
- Added to NRHP: December 18, 1983

Stonehenge, also known as Stone Cottage or High House, is a historic summer estate house on Windmill Hill Road in Dublin, New Hampshire. Built in 1889, it is one of the first summer houses to be built in eastern Dublin, and was a centerpiece of the extensive holdings of the Parsons family. The house was listed on the National Register of Historic Places in 1983.

== Description and history ==
Stonehenge is located in a rural setting in eastern Dublin, on the north side of Windmill Hill Road, at the end of a long drive east of Parsons Road. It is a 2 1/2-story shingle style house, with a gambrel roof and a lower level featuring random boulder construction. It has massive fieldstone chimneys, fully shingled upper stories, and eyebrow dormers in the rear roof.

The house was built in 1889 by F. W. Stevens for Martha Parsons, the daughter of a wealthy Boston merchant, and was the first in a series of summer properties built in the area by the Parsons family. In 1913 the property was rented by Cecil Spring Rice, then the British Ambassador to the United States, as part of the British "summer embassy". After the death of Martha Parsons in 1934, the property was sold to composer Timothy Spelman, who had a studio here. The property was acquired in 1950 by Frank McKenna, who separated a wing of the house, and moved it down the hill to the road, where it stands as the McKenna Cottage.

== See also ==
- National Register of Historic Places listings in Cheshire County, New Hampshire
