= Pervigilium Veneris =

Latin poem of uncertain date

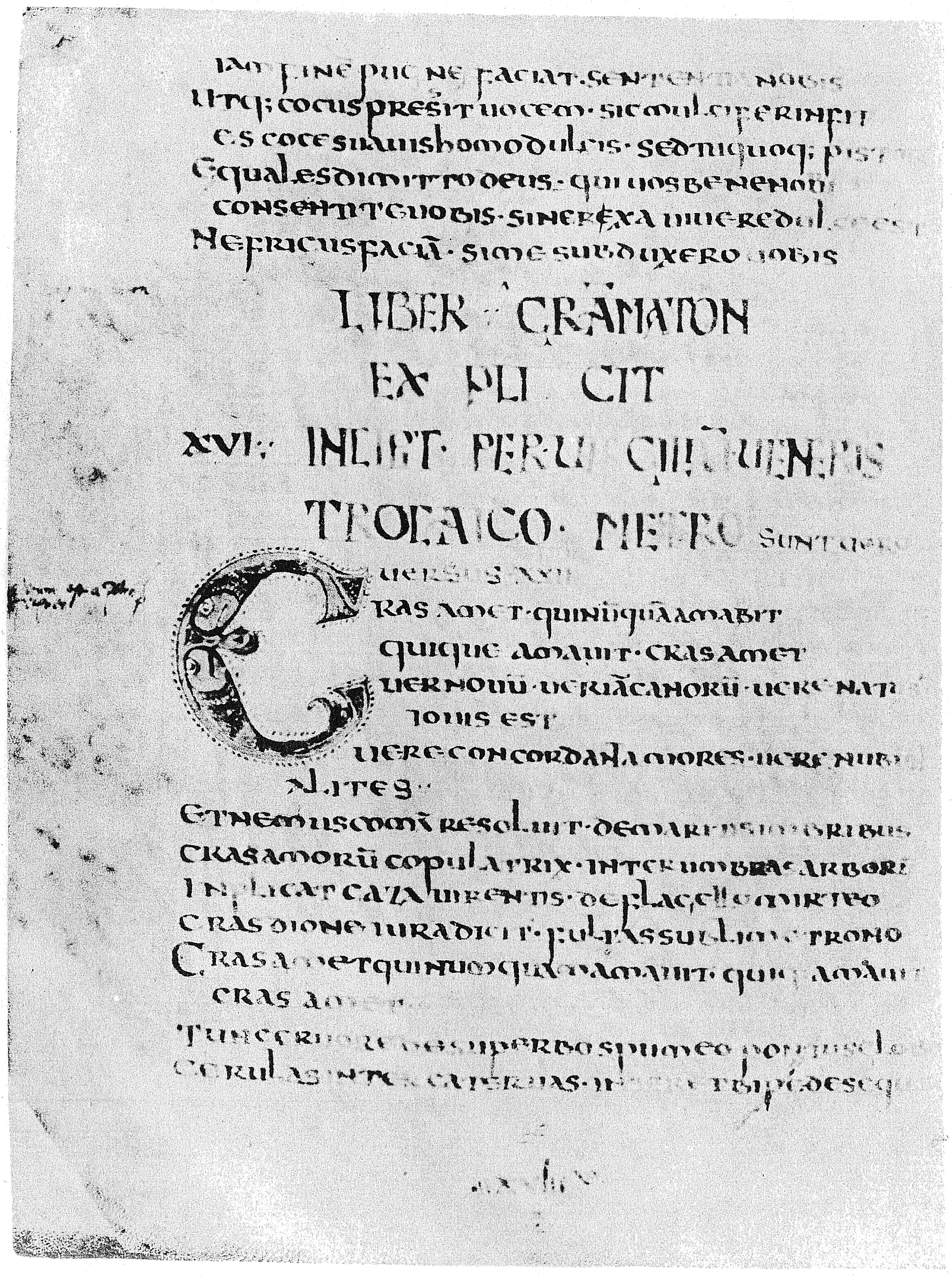
Beginning of the poem in the Codex Salmasianus

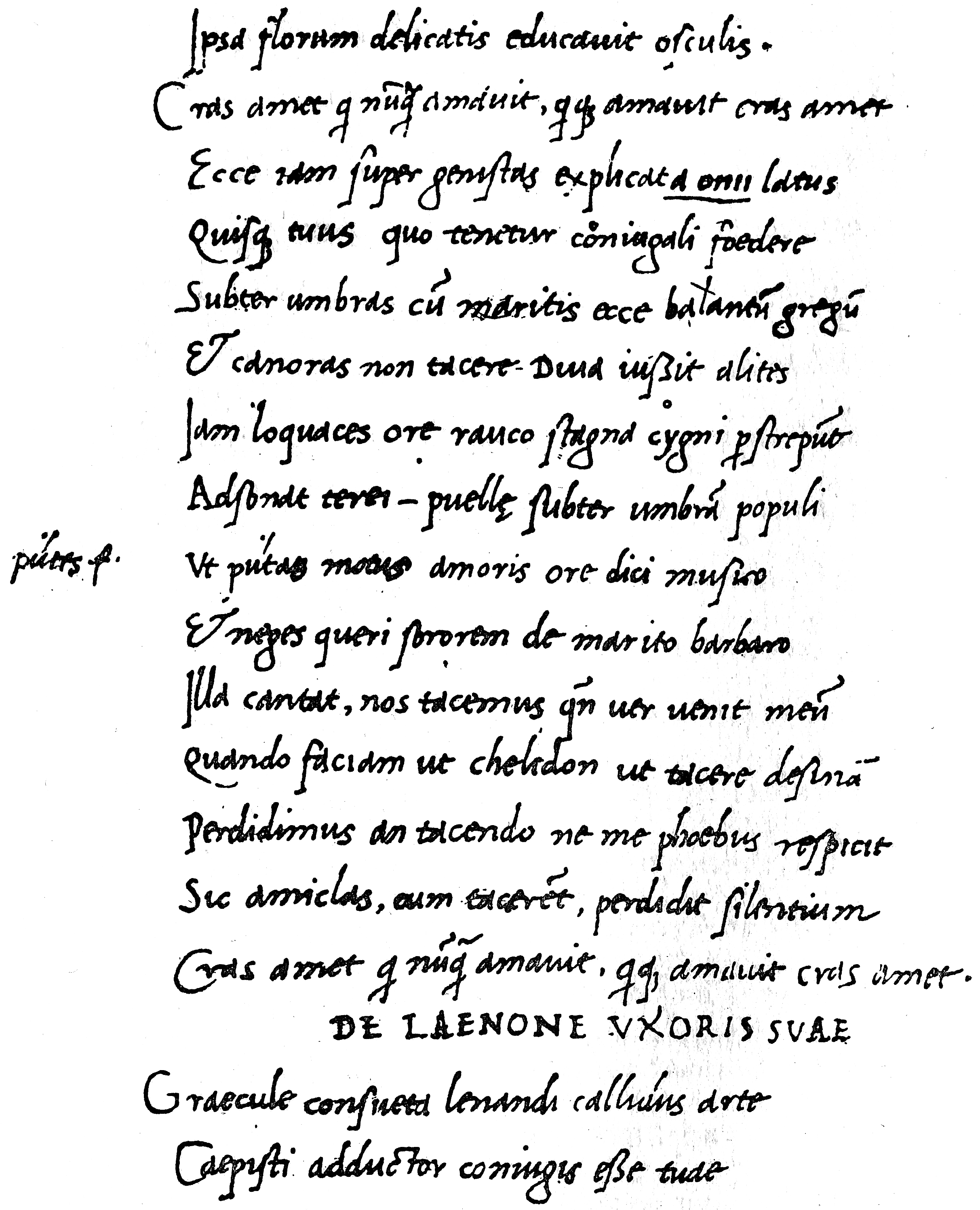
End of the poem in a humanistic manuscript (codex V)

Pervigilium Veneris (or The Vigil of Venus) is a Latin poem of uncertain date, variously assigned to the 2nd, 4th or 5th centuries.

It is sometimes thought to have been by the poet Tiberianus, because of strong similarities with his poem Amnis ibat, though other scholars attribute it to Publius Annius Florus, and yet others find no sufficient evidence for any attribution. It was written professedly in early spring on the eve of a three-night festival of Venus (probably April 1–3) in a setting that seems to be Sicily. The poem describes the annual awakening of the vegetable and animal world through the "benign post-Lucretian" goddess, which contrasts with the tragic isolation of the silent "I" of the poet/speaker, against the desolate background of a ruined city, a vision that prompts Andrea Cucchiarelli to note the resemblance of the poem's construction to the cruelty of a dream. It is notable for its Romanticism which marks a transition between Classical Roman poetry and medieval poetry. It consists of ninety-three verses in trochaic septenarius, and is divided into strophes of unequal length by the refrain:

Cras amet qui nunquam amavit; quique amavit cras amet.

"Let the one love tomorrow who has never loved, and let the one who has loved love tomorrow."

Or by Parnell:

"Let those love now who never loved before,
Let those who always lov'd, now love the more."

== The ending ==
The poem ends with the nightingale's song, and a poignant expression of personal sorrow:

illa cantat; nos tacemus; quando ver venit meum?
Quando fi(am) uti chelidon, ut tacere desinam?
Perdidi Musam tacendo, nec me Phoebus respicit.
Sic Amyclas, cum tacerent, perdidit silentium.
Cras amet qui nunqu(am) amavit; quiqu(e) amavit cras amet.

"She sings, but we are silent; when is my springtime coming?
When shall I become like the swallow, so that I may cease to be silent?
I have destroyed my Muse by being silent, nor does Apollo respect me;
It is in this way that Amyclae, when it would not speak, was destroyed by silence.
Tomorrow let him love, who has never loved; and who has loved, let him love tomorrow."

The nightingale and swallow motif refers to the myth of the two sisters Philomela and Procne, one of whom was turned into a nightingale and the other into a swallow. In the myth, Procne was unable to speak, having had her tongue cut out; but when she was transformed into a swallow, she found her voice again.

The words Quando fiam uti chelidon? were famously quoted by T. S. Eliot in the ending of his poem The Waste Land.

The reference at the end is to a legend that the people of Amyclae, a town near Sparta, made a law that no one was to speak of the Spartans' approach; so that when the Spartans came to attack the city in the 8th century BC, no one gave a warning; hence the proverb Amyclis ipsis taciturnior ("more unwilling to speak than Amyclae itself").

== English verse translations ==
There are translations into English verse by the 17th-century poet Thomas Stanley (1651); by the 18th-century "graveyard school" poet Thomas Parnell (1679–1718); by Sir Arthur Quiller-Couch in The Vigil of Venus and Other Poems by "Q"; by F. L. Lucas (1939; reprinted in his Aphrodite, Cambridge, 1948); and by Allen Tate (1947; see his Collected Poems).

== Musical settings ==
The poem has appealed to 20th-century composers and has been set to music by Frederic Austin for chorus and orchestra (first performance, Leeds Festival, 1931); by Timothy Mather Spelman, for soprano and baritone solo, chorus and orchestra (1931); by Virgil Thomson as "The Feast of Love", for baritone and chamber orchestra, text translated by himself (1964); and by George Lloyd for soprano, tenor, chorus, and orchestra (1980). The 8th movement "Let them love" of Alec Roth's cantata "A Time to Dance" is a setting of 6 lines from "Pervigilium Veneris", translated into English by the composer.

== Modern editions ==
- Editio princeps (1577)
- Franz Bücheler (1859)
- Alexander Riese, in Anthologia Latina (1869)
- E. Bahrens in Unedierte lateinische Gedichte (1877)
- S. G. Owen (with Catullus) (1893)
- D. R. Shackleton Bailey in volume six of the Loeb classical library: Gaius Valerius Catullus, Tibullus and [Tiberianus] Pervigilium veneris, G. P. Goold, editor, translated by Francis Warre Cornish, John Percival Postgate, John William Mackail, second edition, revised (Harvard University Press, 1988)
- Andrea Cucchiarelli. La veglia di Venere. Pervigilium Veneris in BUR Classici Greci e Latini. Biblioteca Universale (Milano: Rizzoli, 2003) ISBN 88-17-10635-6. Paperback. With notes and facing translation in Italian. This new edition, with Latin text based largely on Shackelton Bailey, includes a brief anthology of commentary – from Voltaire to contemporary criticism (pp. 51–60) and an up-to-date bibliography (pp. 61–72). There is also an appendix (pp. 155–65) of texts and Italian translations of some of the most famous poems of late antiquity devoted to the theme of the rose – many from the so-called Latin Anthology, a collection of poems from the imperial age thought to have been assembled at Carthage "during the cultural renaissance of Vandalic Africa in the 5th century CE. This appendix highlights the vitality of the rose topos and of the symbolism associated with it, which spread from the ancient world into European literature of all ages, and it offers the reader a welcome opportunity for reading and appreciating, this time in an Italian translation, a series of poems scarcely studied or known."
- William M. Barton (2018). The Pervigilium Veneris: A New Critical Text, Translation and Commentary. Bloomsbury.

== Influence ==
John Fowles' The Magus ends indeterminately with the vigil's refrain, a passage to which he often directed readers wishing greater clarity about the novel's conclusion.

T. S. Eliot quotes and cites in the final section of The Waste Land.
