= Publilius Syrus =

1st century BC Syrian-born Latin writer

Publilius Syrus (fl. 85–43 BC) was a Latin writer, best known for his sententiae. He was a Roman Syrian from Antioch who was brought as a slave to Roman Italy. Syrus was brought to Rome on the same ship that brought a certain Manilius Antiochus, astronomer, (Note: For essays examining just about every "Manilius" in classical antiquity, including Manilius Antiochus and the Manilius who makes statements about birds, pondering whether they might be Marcus Manilius, author of the Astronomica see and Astronomica § Authorship and date.) and Staberius Eros the grammarian. By his wit and talent, Syrus won the favour of his master, who granted him manumission and educated him. He became a member of the Publilia gens. Publilius' name, due to the palatalization of 'l' between two 'i's in the Early Middle Ages, is often presented by manuscripts (and some printed editions) in corrupt form as 'Publius', Publius being a very common Roman praenomen.

== Work ==
His mimes, in which he acted, had a great success in the provincial towns of Italy and at the games given by Julius Caesar in 46 BC. Publilius was perhaps even more famous as an improviser. He received from Julius Caesar the prize in a contest, in which Syrus vanquished all his competitors, including the celebrated Decimus Laberius.

His performances acquired the praise of many, but not of Cicero who, on the contrary, wrote to his friend Cornificius c. 45 BC "For my part, I have grown so hardened that, at the games of our friend Caesar, I was inured to seeing T. Plancus and to hearing the recitals of Laberius and Publilius."

All that remains of his corpus is a collection of sententiae, a series of moral maxims in iambic and trochaic verse. This collection must have been made at a very early date because it was known to Aulus Gellius in the 2nd century AD. Each maxim consists of a single verse, and the verses are arranged in alphabetical order according to their initial letters. Over time, the collection was interpolated with sentences drawn from other writers, especially from apocryphal writings of Seneca the Younger. The number of genuine verses is about 700. They include many pithy sayings, such as the famous "iudex damnatur ubi nocens absolvitur" ("The judge is condemned when the guilty is acquitted"), which was adopted as its motto by the Edinburgh Review. Due to the fragmentary nature of the collections, many of the sayings are contradictory or do not make much sense. The original plays and characters they were written for are lost to time. Only two titles of his plays survive: Putatores (the Pruners) and a play amended to Murmidon.

== Texts ==
As of 1911, the best texts of the Sentences were those of Eduard Wölfflin (1869), A. Spengel (1874), and Wilhelm Meyer (1880), with complete critical apparatus and index verborum; editions with notes by O. Friedrich (1880), R. A. H. Bickford-Smith (1895), with full bibliography; see also W. Meyer, Die Sammlungen der Spruchverse des Publilius Syrus (1877), an important work. His works were also translated into English by J. Wight Duff and Arnold M. Duff in 1934.

== Influence ==
Seneca the Younger strived to develop a "sententious style" like Publilius throughout his life. He quotes Syrus in his Moral Epistles to Lucilius in the eighth moral letter, "On the Philosopher's Seclusion" and the ninety-fourth, "On the Value of Advice".

William Shakespeare in the first scene of the fifth act of Much Ado About Nothing, has Don Pedro proverbially say: "if she did not hate him deadly, she would love him dearly." W.L. Rushton argues that this is derived from John Lyly's Euphues. If Shakespeare had not taken this from Lyly, then he and Lyly both derived this expression from Publilius.

The Muddy Waters song Rollin' Stone (1950) was named after a proverbial maxim of Publilius: "A rolling stone gathers no moss" (Latin: Saxum volutum non obducitur musco). The phrase also is given as "Musco lapis volutus haud obducitur" and in some cases as "Musco lapis volutus haud obvolvitur". The British rock band The Rolling Stones in turn was named after Muddy Waters' song.
