= Fabius Planciades Fulgentius =

Latin author from the late 5th and early 6th century

Fabius Planciades Fulgentius (fl. late 5th – early 6th century) was a Latin writer of late antiquity. Four extant works are commonly attributed to him, as well as a possible fifth which some scholars include in compilations with much reservation. His mythography was greatly admired and highly influential throughout much of the medieval period, though less influential today.

== Life ==
Very little is known about the life of Fulgentius other than the few references he makes to himself in his own works. His style of Latin, his knowledge of Greek, and his view on classical authors and cults suggests that he was probably educated in North Africa. Other references to African culture in his work support placing him in this region before the Muslim invasions of the 7th century. Moreover, his apparent knowledge of the Libyco-Berber language and script indicates that he was probably an ethnic African: he refers to the language in his On the Ages of the World and of Man as being part of his 'own' heritage. Traditionally, Fulgentius is thought to have had a professional career as a grammaticus or rhetor (teacher of rhetoric). However, this belief is based on small incidental clues Fulgentius leaves behind in work and has been contested by some scholars. It remains possible that he was an amateur writer: in his prologue to Book 1 of the Mythologies, Fulgentius mentions a wife, though it is unclear whether this is a genuine autobiographical detail or part of his fictional persona in the story.

=== Identification with Saint Fulgentius of Ruspe ===
There is a continuing debate as to whether or not Fabius Planciades Fulgentius, and a contemporary, Saint Fulgentius of Ruspe (a Christian bishop) were the same person. The identification of the two Fulgentii was first made by medieval scholars and scribes as far back as the Carolingian period.

There is some overlap in the influences of the two authors (as could be expected from writers working in the same time period and location), such as a common interest in thinkers like Augustine of Hippo. However, the primary focus and concern of each writer seems to set them apart. For example, most of the works attributed to Fulgentius the bishop deal with his opposition to heretical factions such as Arianism, a topic for which Fabius Fulgentius seems to have no concern. Topics on which the bishop seemed to have been strongly opinionated (Arianism, free-will, etc.) are never discussed in the mythographer's work, even when a discussion of such things would seem to fit his discussion. From a linguistic standpoint, the mythographer's unique style and inclusion of otherwise unused words and idioms is not replicated in the work of the bishop, which suggests further a negative identification.

It has been suggested that Fabius Fulgentius, who is traditionally thought to have been writing in the late 5th and early 6th centuries may have borrowed a line from Corippus's Iohannis in his Mythologies, which indicates that he was writing after 550. This discovery has called into serious doubt the possibility of identifying the bishop as the mythographer, as Saint Fulgentius of Ruspe is known to have died in 533.

Although the identification debate has not yet been settled, the answer to the question of whether to ascribe the authorship of the works to a single person appears to depend on subjective interpretation of the available evidence: Critical analysis which compares the writing styles used in the written works and marginal biographical details. Conflating the authors of the works is a tradition that began centuries ago, but that idea most likely originated as the result of a Carolingian-era scribal error.

== Writings ==
The four extant works attributed to Fulgentius include (listed in what is believed to be chronological order):

1. Mythologiae (Mythologies)
2. Expositio continentiae Virgilianae secundum philosophos moralis (The Exposition of the Content of Virgil According to Moral Philosophy)
3. Expositio sermonum antiquorum (The Explanation of Obsolete Words)
4. De aetatibus mundi et hominis (On the Ages of the World and of Man)

A fifth work, which in the past has been attributed to Fulgentius is the Super Thebaiden (On the Thebaid). The manuscript ascribes the work to "S. Fulgencius Episcopus", whom Rudolf Helm (the first modern publisher of Fulgentius' work) considered to be the mythographer. This work was not included in the Carolingian manuscripts (possibly because it did not exist at this time), but was included in Helm's 1897 edition of the works of Fulgentius with strong reservations. While there is no consensus on the authenticity of the treatise, there is strong evidence to support the fact that the work was written in the twelfth century by a writer imitating the allegorical style of Fulgentius. This is not to say that the work was a forgery, but more likely that it was mistakenly attributed to Fulgentius as a result of scribal error.

In addition to these, Fulgentius mentions other works that have not survived to the present. In the first prologue to the Mythologies he mentions earlier satirical poems, and in the Content of Virgil he makes reference to his work on physiology.

=== Mythologies ===
Generally known as his chief work, the Mythologies (Latin: Mitologiarum libri III) is a series of legends told in three books. Each book is introduced by its own prologue. There are a total of fifty chapters: each chapter explains a classical myth and interprets that myth using allegory. These interpretations include etymologies of the names of certain characters, as well as conclusions as to the purpose of the story in terms of morality. In the prologue, Fulgentius claims that his purpose was to strip the classic Greek myths of all their fictitious and meaningless details in order to reveal the obscure truths they contain. He also suggests a Christian motive, though it would be inaccurate to define the Mythologies or any of Fulgentius' allegorical works as 'Christian allegories'. Hays argues the traditional description of Fulgentius' work as 'Christian allegories' is quite inaccurate. The morals Fulgentius extracted from the classical myths were fairly generic, and would have been acceptable to any audience.

Fulgentius's etymologies (while typical of his age) have been recently criticized as being extravagant, arbitrary, and often incorrect. While few have had anything positive to say about such etymological methods within the last two hundred years, the tradition dates back to the work of Plato and was common practice for such philosophic traditions as the Stoics and Neoplatonists. His use of such arbitrary etymologies to substantiate his allegorical claims is typical of his relentless tendency to stretch interpretations and search for truths that are not readily evident.

Several manuscripts of the Mythologies are addressed to an unidentified Catus, Presbyter of Carthage.

=== The exposition of the content of Virgil according to moral philosophy ===
In this exposition (Latin: Expositio Virgilianae continentiae secundum philosophos moralis), Virgil and the Muses are summoned to explain the truth of his Aeneid. This text is similar to Fulgentius's interpretations of classical myths in the Mythologies . The shade of Virgil assumes a sage-like status, and he addresses the author in a pretentious and condescending way, often calling him a "homunculus", or 'boy'.

While Fulgentius claims to explain the Aeneid as an allegory for the full range of human life, the work seems to end rather abruptly, and the telling only goes as far as manhood. There is no evidence to suggest, however, that any part of the original text was lost. His hurried finish was probably caused by a loss of interest in its completion.

By the time of the Content of Virgil's writing, the tradition of allegorizing Virgil was not new. Aelius Donatus had already completed an allegorical exposition of passages of the Aeneid which closely resembles Fulgentius's ideas, indicating that they were probably not unique to Fulgentius. Furthermore, Fulgentius appears to have taken the idea of Virgil as a sage from the earlier writer Macrobius. However, it seems Fulgentius was original in his attempt to systematically interpret the entire Aeneid. He also seems to be the first to attempt to explain the text in a way at least partly acceptable to Christian readers.

=== The explanation of obsolete words ===
This text (Latin: Expositio sermonum antiquorum), addressed to a person named Calcidium in some manuscripts, is an explanation of 62 antique Latin words that may be found in Roman literature. In his Prologue to the work, Fulgentius states that he compiled the list of words in order to fulfill the commissions assigned by his master (who remains unidentified). His stated aim is to make clear the meaning of these words, not to revive them. However, beginning in the Carolingian period, writers did in fact make use of these rarities, using this text as their source.

With nearly every explanation, Fulgentius provides the reader with a small quotation as an example of the word's practical use, often citing the work it was taken from. However, many of these quotes are likely to be faked. Some works may be entirely made-up, while others have been liberally edited by Fulgentius. As was common with writers of this period, Fulgentius does not cite his immediate sources, perhaps in an attempt to obscure the fact that he had access to very few to draw from. The entire work was probably an attempt to improve his reputation as a scholar in hopes the reader would not take a critical look into his methods.

=== On the ages of the world and of man ===
This compendium of biblical and classical history (original title: De aetatibus mundi et hominis libri XXIII) is told in fourteen books, each lacking a particular letter of the alphabet ('A' in book i, 'B' in book ii., etc.). The deliberate omission of each letter means that Fulgentius cannot use any word containing that letter for the entirety of that section. However, he varies this avoidance of words with his second technique of swapping omitted letters for other arbitrarily selected letters. These techniques obscure his language, making it very difficult for the reader to understand his meaning. Just as in the Content of Virgil, Fulgentius claims the work was completed as a result of the request of his unnamed patron.

The increasingly rapid rate of historical retelling that occurs near the end of the work raises the question of whether the work was completed. Some manuscripts include in their prologues an introduction of the text as running 'from a to z', and others end book fourteen with the statement, "Here begins the fifteenth book, lacking P". However, book thirteen includes a line about ending the series with a history of the Roman emperors. It is possible that the last books have been lost over time, though it is also likely that Fulgentius simply lost interest in the work and gave it a hurried anticlimactic finish, as he did with other works such as the Content of Virgil.

Throughout his retelling of history, Fulgentius adds moral interpretations of events. He goes to great lengths to justify God's ways, and, consistent with his past works, stretches allegories to fit his ethical interpretations.

Unlike Fulgentius' other works, Ages of the World did not seem to attract much attention or admiration in the medieval period, probably due to its confusing literary techniques and style.

There has been some doubt as to whether or not this work was actually that of Fabius Fulgentius, though similarities in language and writing style convincingly demonstrate the attribution of this work to the same author as the first three. Among the arguments for a different author is an argument in favor of attributing this work to the bishop Fulgentius. This theory is based on the fact that the manuscripts of the Ages of the World attribute the work to "Fabius Claudius Gordianus Fulgentius" (Claudius and Gordianus both being names known to belong to members of the bishop's immediate family). However, the inclusion of these names in manuscripts was most likely the mistake of some eight or ninth century scribe who assumed 'Fulgentius' to be the well-known theologian. It is also possible that Fabius Fulgentius had multiple names (very popular for aristocrats of the time) which included Claudius and Gordianus.

== Historiographical contribution ==
Fulgentius's work demonstrates a clear continuation of the antique Roman compendium tradition. This concise encyclopaedic style of compiling information was common for Roman writers like Cato the Elder and Cicero. His work is also consistent with the Stoic and Neoplatonic traditions which interpreted myth as a representation of deeper spiritual processes. His allegorical approach to mythography may have originated in the no-longer-extant Virgil commentary of Aelius Donatus, and it was certainly evident in the later moralising Virgil commentaries of Servius. Fulgentius's treatment of Virgil as a sage seems to have been borrowed from the encyclopaedic work of Macrobius, the first to elevate the Roman poet to such an authoritative status. However, Fulgentius's tendency to strip classical myth of all its manifest detail and replace it with ethical interpretations appears to have more in common with the late 5th-century writer Martianus Capella. Capella's work brought the theme of life as a spiritual journey to the forefront of Classical literature, a trend which Fulgentius seemed to carry a step further.

The Tradition of invoking the aid of questionable etymologies in order to support mythological allegories dates back to Plato, and carried on through Aristotle, the Stoics, and into the Middle Ages. Though Fulgentius was later criticized for such methods, they were not uncommon for writers of the time period (including Martianus Capella).

Fulgentius's summaries of classical myths have traditionally been compared to his predecessor, Hyginus the mythographer, of the 2nd century AD. While both deal with many of the same legends, and some commonalities between their summaries suggests a common source, their work differs greatly in purpose and interest. Hyginus appears to have been dedicated to producing a comprehensive reference book for the myths, while Fulgentius was more concerned with allegorically dissecting the material, something Hyginus rarely attempts.

=== Influence on later mythography ===
Fulgentius's work is said to mark the transition from late-antique to Medieval literary study. After a period of decreased interest in the literature, the practice of mythography was picked up again in what is thought to be the 7th century by the so-called Vatican Mythographers. All three writers borrow Fulgentius's methods in order to search the classical myths for obscured meaning. However, it was during the Carolingian period, from the 8th through to the 10th centuries, that Fulgentius's work reached the height of its popularity. He came to be admired as one of the founding fathers of mythographic writing, and he was praised for uniting classical pagan literature and Christian teachings. This admiration led to the emergence of Fulgentian scholarship. The practice of differentiating between the author's intention and the deeper meaning of a piece of literature—carried to the extreme by Fulgentius—provided the framework for the commentaries of this period. The Mythologies in particular proved to be an essential storehouse of resources for the Medieval commentators who carried on his tradition of discussing classical poetry in moral terms. Further, his exotic language and use of rare words seemed to influence the writing style of a number of poets throughout the Middle Ages.

Fulgentius's manuscripts date as far back as the early 8th century. As a testament to his popularity, a copy of the Mythologies may have been available in England as early as the 9th century. Fulgentius remained a standard part of collections of antique mythology up until the 19th century, when his work began to come under popular criticism as being absurd and factually unreliable.

It has been suggested that Fulgentius' work, which is thought to have been commonly known throughout most of the Middle Ages, may have been a source for the structure of the famous Anglo-Saxon epic Beowulf.

== Criticism ==
While Fulgentius's works remained popular during and well after the Carolingian period, his factual inaccuracies and questionable interpretations came under harsh criticism in the 19th century. His work has been overwhelmingly dismissed as trivial and misleading ever since. Historically, Fulgentius's work has been criticized as being bombastic and foolish. His Latin prose is obscure and often corrupt, making it difficult to decipher his meaning. He is known for unnecessarily long and wordy prose and highly obscure allusions.

Fulgentius is also known to make significant mistakes in his retelling of history, like his conflation of Augustus with Julius Caesar in On the Ages of the World and of Man. In addition, many of his facts, as well as his etymologies, are suspected of being based on second-hand sources or completely fabricated.

== See also ==
- Aelius Donatus
- Martianus Capella
- Macrobius
- Tiberianus
