= Tiberianus (poet) =

Roman poet

Tiberianus was a late Latin writer and poet, surviving only in fragments, who experimented with various metrical schemes.

He is a possible candidate for the authorship of the Pervigilium Veneris.

== Identity ==
Tiberianus has traditionally been identified with Annius Tiberianus, the "eloquent" [disertus] governor of Gaul in 336 AD mentioned by Jerome.

An earlier candidate is however the prefect of Rome 303–4, Iunius Tiberianus.

== Known poems ==
Four poems (and a fragmentary fifth on a sunset) are known to have been written by Tiberianus: Spring Day [Amnis ibat]; an attack on the power of gold; a hymn; and a description of a dying bird.

== Other writings ==
- Fulgentius attributed to Tiberianus the writing of prosimetra, dialogues in verse and prose (from which the extant poems may have been taken).
- E. Baehrens in the 19th century suggested Tiberianus as the author of the Pervigilium Veneris, something metrical parallels with Amnis ibat would seem to support. Alan Cameron in the 20th century strengthened the case for his authorship through thematic and vocabulary parallels.

== Influences ==
Tiberianus was influenced by authors such as Ovid, Statius, Calpurnius Siculus, and the prose of Apuleius.

Read and quoted by Fulgentius and Augustine, his metrical experiments may also have influenced such Christian poets as Hilary of Poitiers and Prudentius.

== See also ==
- Ausonius
- Paulinus of Nola
