= Astronomica =

"Astronomica" is a Latin, Italian, and Occitan adjective meaning "astronomical". Astronomica may refer to:

- Astronomica (Manilius), a classical work by Marcus Manilius from around the early 1st century AD
- De astronomia or the Astronomica, a different classical work attributed to Gaius Julius Hyginus, also from around the early 1st century AD
- Astronomica (album), a 1999 album by the American progressive metal band Crimson Glory
- Astronomica: The Quest for the Edge of the Universe, a 1994 educational game by Hyper-Quest, Inc.

== See also ==
- Astronomia (disambiguation)
