= Latin Anthology =

Compilation of Latin verses from the era of Ennius

The Latin Anthology is a compilation of Latin verses with an emphasis on Carthaginian texts of the 6th century, originally published by Pieter Burmann the Younger (1713 – 1778). It was compiled from a number of Carolingian manuscripts, particularly the Codex Salmasianus, BNF MS Paris. Lat. 10318 circa 800 CE, and the Anthologia Vossianus, Leiden MS Lat. Q. 86, circa 850 CE.

While the Greek Anthology was first compiled by the ancient Greek poet, Meleager of Gadara in the first century BC, the ancient Romans did not compile their own Latin Anthology. However, there were volumes of epigrams, such as those compiled by Martial between 95 and 98. There were also compilations of brief sententiae from authors such as Publilius Syrus (fl. 85–43 BC), along with smaller groupings of verse on specialized subjects, such as the Priapeia (circa 100).

== Development of the Anthology ==
While many of these classical and late antique texts are connected by the Carolingian manuscripts that they were preserved in, the concept of an "Anthologia Latina" or Latin Anthology is a modern creation inspired by the older Greek Anthology, and triggered by the rediscovery of the Codex Salmasianus, which is named after it first documented owner, Claude Saumaise, who acquired it in 1615. The first modern collection of these fragmented pieces was the Anthologia veterum Latinorum Epigrammatum et Poematum by Pieter Burmann, which he assembled from 1759 to 1773. Earlier, a handful of the poems that ended up in Burmann's volume had appeared in Catalecta veterum Poetarum (1573), created by J. J. Scaliger, in C. Binet's volume of Petronius (1579), and in P. Pithou's Epigrammata et Poemata e Codicibus et Lapidibus collecta (1590).

Burmann's volume became the standard edition until 1869, when Alexander Riese started a new and more critical recension. In this revision, many pieces that were improperly included by Burmann were removed, and his classification system was replaced. It arranged the material according to the sources, starting with those derived from manuscripts, followed by those obtained from inscriptions.The second volume (in two parts) was released in 1895–1897, with the title Carmina Epigraphica, edited by Franz Bücheler. In 1982, an entirely new edition of the first part was published by D. R. Shackleton Bailey.

As the Latin Anthology was formed by scholars with a primary focus on preserving as much material as they could find, it is significantly more diverse than the Greek Anthology.
