= McKenna Cottage =

Historic house in New Hampshire, United States

- U.S. National Register of Historic Places
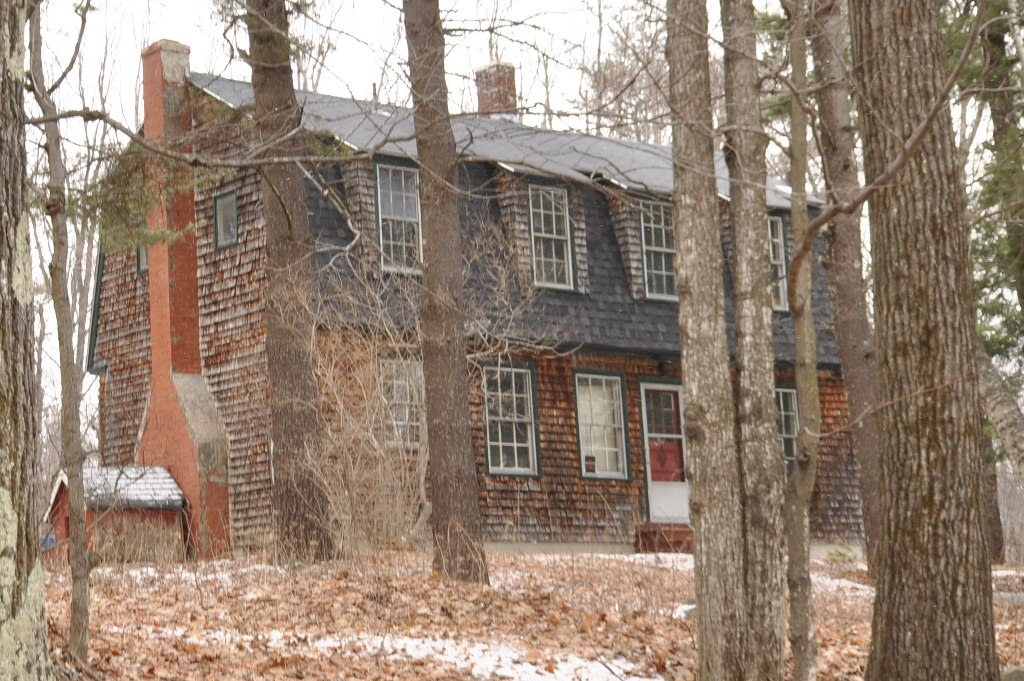

- Location within New Hampshire Location within the United States
- Location: Windmill Hill Rd., Dublin, New Hampshire
- Coordinates: 42°53′44″N 72°3′30″W
- Area: 0.2 acres (0.081 ha)
- Built: 1889
- Built by: Stevens, F.W.
- Architectural style: Shingle Style
- MPS: Dublin MRA
- NRHP reference No.: 83004051
- Added to NRHP: December 18, 1983

The McKenna Cottage is a historic house on Windmill Hill Road in Dublin, New Hampshire. It was originally built about 1889 as a single-story wing of the nearby Stonehenge estate house. It is a good example of Shingle style architecture, and one of the town's surviving reminders of the turn-of-the-century summer estate period. The house was listed on the National Register of Historic Places in 1983.

== Description and history ==
The McKenna Cottage is located in a rural setting southeast of Dublin's village center, on the north side of Windmill Hill Road east of its junction with Parsons Road. It is a two-story wood-frame structure, with a gambrel roof and shingled exterior. It has brick chimneys at the ends, and four shed-roof dormers projecting from the steep face of the roof. The ground floor of the front facade is five bays wide, with the entrance in the center-right bay. Windows are uniformly six-over-six sash windows.

The house was built as a single-story structure that was part of the main house of the nearby Stonehenge summer estate of the Parson family. It was raised to two stories in 1904, and separated from the main house and moved to its present location on the north side of the hill in 1954. It continues to exhibit the Shingle styling of its original construction, a signature style of Dublin's summer estates.

== See also ==
- National Register of Historic Places listings in Cheshire County, New Hampshire
