= Astronomia.pl =

Polish portal about astronomy and space research

- Website type: educational portal
- Available in: Polish/English
- Owner: Grupa Astronomia
- Creator: Astronomia.pl team
- Commercial: No
- Registration: No
- Launched: 17 October 2001
- Current status: It stopped activity

Astronomia.pl was a Polish portal about astronomy and space research that was created in 2001 and remained active until 2015. At the time, it was Poland's largest portal about astronomy and space, hosting more than three thousand articles and attracting a hundred thousand visitors a month. The full name of Astronomia.pl was Polski Portal Astronomiczny ("Polish Astronomy Portal"). Astronomia.pl was mainly a Polish language website, with just a small part of its content presented in English.

== History ==
In 2003, the website was awarded Honourable Patronage by the Polish Association of Amateur Astronomers. In 2004 and 2005, the portal produced a television show, Magazyn Astronomia ("Astronomy Magazine"), broadcast by TVN Meteo. In 2006, the website was awarded a prize in the Popularyzator Nauki ("Science Communicator") contest jointly organized by the Ministry of Science and Higher Education and the Polish Press Agency's "Science in Poland" project.

== Characteristics ==
Features provided by the portal included a daily news bulletin, a database of articles, a gallery of images, a discussion forum, a virtual library of master's theses, an English-Polish astronomical dictionary, a newsletter, RSS channels and others. Astronomia.pl also published a news bulletin in English, which included translations of articles concerning Polish amateur and professional astronomy.

Astronomia.pl also provided links to other sites devoted to astronomy, such as Kopernik.pl, containing biographies of astronomers, Planetarium.pl, a site about Polish planetaria, and AstroWWW.pl, which aggregated websites created and run by amateur astronomers.

The portal supported various astronomical initiatives undertaken by educational organizations, publishers and other institutions. It also entertained its users with quizzes and competitions.
