= Decimus Laberius =

1st century BC Roman eques and writer of mimes (farces)

Decimus Laberius (c. 105 BC – 43 BC) was a Roman eques and writer of mimes (farces).

== Biography ==
Laberius seems to have been a man of caustic wit, who wrote for his own pleasure. In 46 BC, Julius Caesar ordered him to appear in one of his own plays in a public contest with the actor Publilius Syrus. Laberius pronounced a dignified prologue on the degradation thus thrust on his sixty years, and directed several sharp allusions against the dictator, including apparently predicting Caesar's demise: Needs must he fear, who makes all else adread. Later that day, he added:

None the first place for ever can retain -
But, ever as the topmost round you gain,
Painful your station there and swift your fall.

Caesar awarded the victory to Publilius, but restored Laberius to his equestrian rank, which he had forfeited by appearing as a mimus. Laberius was the chief of those who introduced the mimus into Latin literature towards the close of the Republican period. He seems to have been a man of learning and culture, but his pieces did not escape the coarseness inherent to the class of literature to which they belonged; and Aulus Gellius accuses him of extravagance in the coining of new words. Horace speaks of him in terms of qualified praise.
