= Astronomica: The Quest for the Edge of the Universe =

1994 video game

- Developers: FX Media, Ringling Multimedia
- Publisher: Hyper-Quest
- Platforms: Macintosh, Windows 3.x
- Release: NA: 1994
- Genres: Action, Educational

Astronomica: The Quest for the Edge of the Universe is an educational game made by Hyper-Quest, Inc. in 1994 for Macintosh and Windows 3.x. The game developers purposely made the game's main character a girl, explaining "Younger girls are often left out of multimedia games, so we made the main character in Astronomica a girl".

== Synopsis ==
Game play centers around the player searching for a missing employee SkyQuest AstroLab, an astronomer that was working on a supercomputer named Astronomica prior to his disappearance. Players must solve several puzzles based on space trivia to progress.

== Reception ==
Critical reception for Astronomica has been mixed, with many outlets criticizing its difficulty of game play. Entertainment Weekly rated the game a C+, writing "Ultimately, Astronomica does little more than familiarize players with basic space terms. Despite some sloppy production values (such as the director’s audible ”Action!”), the game does offer a reference encyclopedia and detailed planetary photographs science buffs will appreciate." The Washington Post was also critical of the game, as they felt it was "low-budget programming and design, pure and simple".

Computer Shopper was more positive, commenting "with some of the slickest photo-realistic 3-D images around, it's as much a feast for the eyes as for the brain."
