= Timothy Mather Spelman =

American composer

Timothy Mather Spelman (January 21, 1891 – August 21, 1970) was an American composer.

Spelman was a native of Brooklyn, and studied in New York with Harry Rowe Shelley in 1908; further study came with Albert Spalding and Edward Burlingame Hill at Harvard University from 1909 until 1913, and from 1913 to 1915 with Walter Courvoisier at the University of Music and Performing Arts Munich. In the latter year, returning to the United States, Spelman took up a post as assistant director of training for band musicians under the United States Department of War. In 1918 he and his wife, the poet Leolyn Louise Everett, returned to Europe and settled in Florence; except for the years between 1935 and 1947, during which the couple returned to the United States, he spent the rest of his life resident in Italy.

Spelman's music is reminiscent more of Impressionism and European Romanticism, and typically received more performances in Europe than in his native country. Many of his works, including three operas and a large number of songs, were composed to texts by his wife; another notable work is his setting of the Pervigilium Veneris.

Spelman's manuscripts are held at the Peabody Institute Library of Johns Hopkins University, as is a collection of other family papers. The couple's villa in Florence was also bequeathed to the university, where it was dedicated as the Charles S. Singleton Center for Italian Studies, sometimes known as Villa Spelman.

== Compositions ==
- Christ and the Blind Man, symphonic poem for orchestra
- Barbaresques, suite for orchestra
- Saints' Days, for orchestra (1925)
- The Sea-Rovers, opera (1928)
- Miles Standish, opera
- Symphony for orchestra
- Concerto for oboe and orchestra
- Piano sonata
- String quartet
- Litany of the Middle Ages, cantata
- Pervigilium Veneris, for chorus

Taken from

== See also ==
- Biography at the Johns Hopkins Library website
