= Staberia gens =

Ancient Roman family

The gens Staberia was a minor plebeian family at ancient Rome. Members of this gens are first mentioned in the final decades of the Republic, but they never achieved much importance. The most illustrious of the Staberii may have been the Grammarian Staberius Eros, though he was a freedman. One of this family served as a military tribune in the time of Vespasian, but none of the Staberii obtained any of the higher offices of the Roman state; the consul Marcus Pompeius Silvanus Staberius Flavianus belonged to the Pompeia gens, although he was probably descended from the Staberii through a female line.

== Origin ==
The nomen Staberius is probably of Oscan origin. Chase classifies it among those names that did not originate at Rome, but were of Oscan, Umbrian, or Picentine derivation.

== Members ==
This list includes abbreviated praenomina. For an explanation of this practice, see filiation.

- Staberius, a wealthy man whose will stipulated that his heirs should have the amount of their inheritance engraved upon his tombstone; otherwise, they were to exhibit games featuring a hundred pairs of gladiators, and such other entertainment as dictated by a certain Arrius, and purchase as much grain as was grown in Africa. Horace gives Staberius as an example of the madness of the covetous.
- Lucius Staberius, prefect of Apollonia under Pompeius in 48 BC, during the Civil War. When Caesar's forces approached the city, the populace determined to welcome him, forcing Staberius to abandon his position.
- Quintus Staberius, mentioned by Cicero in 45 BC as the owner of land in which he was interested at Pompeii or Nola in Campania.
- Staberius Eros, a grammarian of considerable repute, highly praised by Fronto. Pliny the Elder notes in Natural History that he was "our first grammarian", a slave brought by ship from overseas, and "recommended to notice [by his] literary honours"
- Titus Staberius T. f. Secundus, a military tribune with the Legio VII Gemina in Germania Inferior during the reign of Vespasian. According to a military diploma from AD 78, he had been prefect of a cohort of soldiers from Chalcedon in Africa, and prefect of a Moesian cavalry wing.

== See also ==
- List of Roman gentes

== Bibliography ==
- Marcus Tullius Cicero, Epistulae ad Atticum.
- Gaius Julius Caesar, Commentarii de Bello Civili (Commentaries on the Civil War).
- Quintus Horatius Flaccus (Horace), Satirae (Satires).
- Pomponius Porphyrion, Commentarii in Q. Horatium Flaccum (Commentaries on Horace).
- Gaius Suetonius Tranquillus, De Illustribus Grammaticis (On the Illustrious Grammarians).
- Appianus Alexandrinus (Appian), Bellum Civile (The Civil War).
- Dictionary of Greek and Roman Biography and Mythology, William Smith, ed., Little, Brown and Company, Boston (1849).
- Theodor Mommsen et alii, Corpus Inscriptionum Latinarum (The Body of Latin Inscriptions, abbreviated CIL), Berlin-Brandenburgische Akademie der Wissenschaften (1853–present).
- August Pauly, Georg Wissowa, et alii, Realencyclopädie der Classischen Altertumswissenschaft (Scientific Encyclopedia of the Knowledge of Classical Antiquities, abbreviated RE or PW), J. B. Metzler, Stuttgart (1894–1980).
- George Davis Chase, "The Origin of Roman Praenomina", in Harvard Studies in Classical Philology, vol. VIII, pp. 103–184 (1897).
- Paul von Rohden, Elimar Klebs, & Hermann Dessau, Prosopographia Imperii Romani (The Prosopography of the Roman Empire, abbreviated PIR), Berlin (1898).
- T. Robert S. Broughton, The Magistrates of the Roman Republic, American Philological Association (1952–1986).
- Werner Eck, "M. Pompeius Silvanus, consul designatus tertium: Ein Vertrauter Vespasians und Domitians", in Zeitschrift für Papyrologie und Epigraphik, vol. 9 (1972).
