= 1154 Astronomia =

Carbonaceous main-belt asteroid

Discovery
- Discovered by: K. Reinmuth
- Discovery site: Heidelberg Obs.
- Discovery date: 8 February 1927

Designations
- Pronunciation: /æstroʊˈnoʊmiə/
- Named after: astronomy (a natural science)
- Alternative designations: 1927 CB · A911 RA
- Minor planet category: main-belt · (outer) background

Orbital characteristics
- Epoch 4 September 2017 (JD 2458000.5)
- Uncertainty parameter 0
- Observation arc: 105.83 yr (38,656 days)
- Aphelion: 3.6308 AU
- Perihelion: 3.1511 AU
- Semi-major axis: 3.3910 AU
- Eccentricity: 0.0707
- Orbital period (sidereal): 6.24 yr (2,281 days)
- Mean anomaly: 22.461°
- Mean motion: 0° 9^{m} 28.08^{s} / day
- Inclination: 4.5323°
- Longitude of ascending node: 82.512°
- Argument of perihelion: 203.85°

Physical characteristics
- Dimensions: 55.4±5.5 km 55.715±0.500 km 57.253±0.339 km 59±6 km 59.68±18.01 km 60.10±16.38 km 61.08 km (SIMPS); 64.20±1.11 km
- Synodic rotation period: 18.1154±0.0139 h (Note: Brincat (2017a) not yet indexed in ADS. Summary figures for (1154) Astronomia at Collaborative Asteroid Lightcurve Link (CALL))
- Geometric albedo: 0.028±0.001; 0.0296 (SIMPS); 0.03±0.01; 0.03±0.02; 0.03±0.03; 0.0337±0.0060; 0.036±0.008; 0.04±0.01
- Spectral type: Tholen = FXU: B–V = 0.658; U–B = 0.229
- Absolute magnitude (H): 10.46 · 10.51 · 10.80±0.10

1154 Astronomia, provisional designation 1927 CB, is a carbonaceous background asteroid from the outer regions of the asteroid belt, approximately 60 kilometers in diameter. It was discovered by German astronomer Karl Reinmuth at the Heidelberg-Königstuhl State Observatory on 8 February 1927. The asteroid was named for the natural science of astronomy.

== Orbit and classification ==
Astronomia is a background asteroid, that is, not a member of any known asteroid family. It orbits the Sun in the outer main-belt at a distance of 3.2–3.6 AU once every 6 years and 3 months (2,281 days). Its orbit has an eccentricity of 0.07 and an inclination of 5° with respect to the ecliptic.

The asteroid was first identified as A911 RA at Heidelberg in September 1911. The body's observation arc begins the night after its official discovery observation at Heidelberg.

== Physical characteristics ==
In the Tholen classification, Astronomia has an ambiguous spectral type, closest to a carbonaceous F-type and somewhat similar to that of an X-type asteroid. Its spectrum has also been flagged as unusual and of poor quality (FXU:).

=== Rotation period ===
In May 2016, the first rotational lightcurve of Astronomia was obtained from photometric observations. Lightcurve analysis gave a rotation period of 18.1154 hours with a brightness variation of 0.39 magnitude (U=3-).

=== Diameter and albedo ===
According to the surveys carried out by the Infrared Astronomical Satellite IRAS, the Japanese Akari satellite and the NEOWISE mission of NASA's Wide-field Infrared Survey Explorer, Astronomia measures between 55.4 and 64.20 kilometers in diameter and its surface has an albedo between 0.028 and 0.04.

The Collaborative Asteroid Lightcurve Link adopts the results obtained by IRAS, that is an albedo of 0.0296 and a diameter of 61.08 kilometers based on an absolute magnitude of 10.51.

== Naming ==
This minor planet was named after the natural science of astronomy, a study of celestial objects, observations and phenomena in the night sky. The official naming citation was mentioned in The Names of the Minor Planets by Paul Herget in 1955 (H 108).
