= Sententia =

Brief moral saying

Sententiae (sing. sententia) are brief moral sayings, such as proverbs, adages, aphorisms, maxims, or apophthegms taken from ancient or popular or other sources, often quoted without context. Sententia, the nominative singular, also called a "sentence", is a kind of rhetorical proof. Through the invocation of a proverb, quotation, or witty turn of phrase during a presentation or conversation one may be able to gain the assent of the listener, who will hear a kind of non-logical, but agreed-upon truth in what one is saying. An example of this is the phrase "age is better with wine" playing off of the adage "wine is better with age". The same saying is present in Luke 5,39.

== History ==
The use of sententiae has been explained by Aristotle, when he discusses the γνώμη (gnomê), or sententious maxim, as a form of enthymeme; Quintilian; and other classical authorities.

Early modern English writers, heavily influenced by various Renaissance humanist educational practices, such as harvesting commonplaces, were especially attracted to sententiae. The technique of sententious speech is exemplified by Polonius' famous speech to Laertes in Hamlet. Sometimes in Elizabethan and Jacobean drama the sententious lines appear at the end of scenes in rhymed couplets (for instance, John Webster's Duchess of Malfi). In some early modern dramatic texts and other writings, sententiae are often flagged by marginal notes or special marks.

The "first Roman book of literary character" was the Sententiae of Appius Claudius Caecus, which was composed upon a Greek model.

A similar literary genre recurred in 1150 within the Libri Quattuor Sententiarum (The Four Books of Sentences) of Peter Lombard, a book which was widely commented during the Middle Age, namely by Saint Thomas Aquinas and Saint Bonaventure.

Publilius Syrus is known for his sententiae.

== Examples ==
- Prosper of Aquitaine's Sententia
- Isidore of Seville's Sententiae

== See also ==
- Commonplace books
