= Volero Publilius =

5th-century BC Roman tribune of the plebs

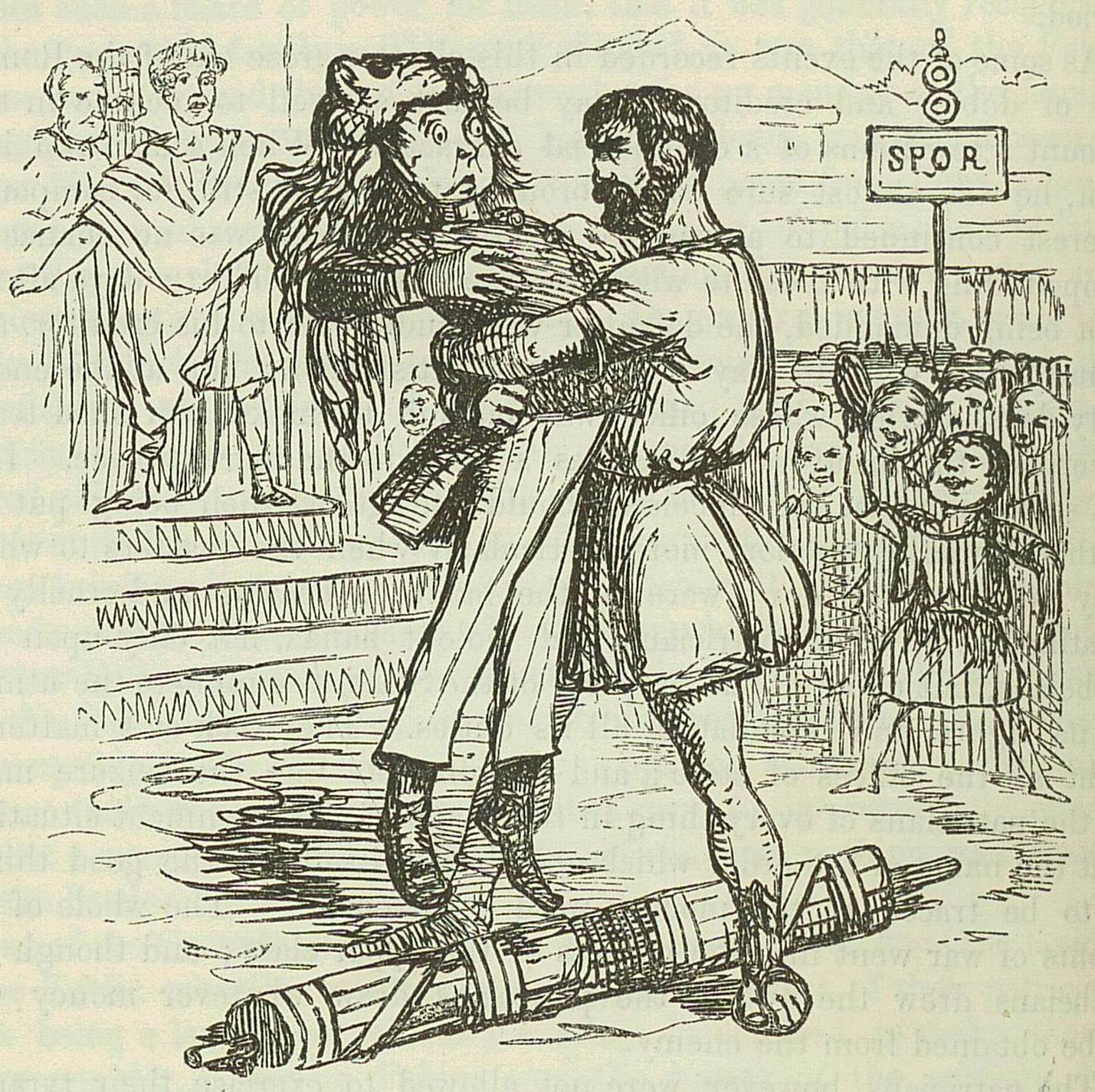
John Leech, A Lictor is sent to arrest Publilius Volero, from The Comic History of Rome. In this account, the powerful Publilius seized the lictor and set him down roughly on the ground.

Volero Publilius (Note: Sometimes referred to as Publilius Volero; Volero was Publilius' praenomen, but as an older name it was not always recognized by ancient or modern historians, who accordingly treated it as a cognomen.) was tribune of the plebs in Rome in 472 and 471 BC. During his time as tribune, he secured the passage of two important laws increasing the independence of his office.

== Background ==
The tribunes of the plebs had been created following the secession of the people in 494 BC. Burdened by crushing debt and angered by a series of clashes between the patricians and plebeians, in which the patricians held all of the political power, the plebeians deserted the city en masse and encamped upon the sacred mount. One of the concessions offered by the senate to end the stand-off was the creation of a new office, tribune of the people, for which only plebeians would be eligible. These tribunes had the power to convene the concilium plebis, one of the three major assemblies of the Roman people, and to propose legislation before it; the power to intercede on behalf of a citizen who wished to appeal from the decision of a magistrate; and the power to veto, or block the actions of the senate and magistrates. The tribunes of the plebs were sacrosanct within the boundaries of Rome, and the entire body of the Roman people obliged to protect them from harm. The tribunes thus became the primary check on the power of the senate, as well as the protectors of the rights of the plebeians.

In 473 BC, the tribune Gnaeus Genucius attempted to bring the consuls of the preceding year to trial for having blocked multiple attempts to bring about agrarian reform. But on the morning of the trial he was found to have been murdered in his house, notwithstanding his sacrosanctity. (Note: This is the account given by Livy, which is followed by most modern scholars, including Niebuhr and Mommsen. Conversely, Dionysius denies that Genucius was murdered, that no sign of violence was found on the body, and that the tribune's death was merely a fortuitous coincidence. Discussing the incident in his Critical History of Early Rome, Gary Forsythe states a clear preference for Dionysius' account, although he strongly suggests that the entire story was a fabrication of the later Roman historians, who borrowed the names and descriptions of events from occurrences in the late Republic.) Cowed by the murder of their colleague, the remaining tribunes failed to block a levy of soldiers. Tensions rose as the leaders of the patrician and plebeian factions each argued that the other side was depriving them of their liberty. Things came to a head when Volero Publilius, who had served as a centurion in the Roman army, was called to serve as a common soldier. He refused, and the consuls sent a lictor to arrest him. Publilius resisted, and a scuffle ensued in which the clothes were torn from Publilius' back; breaking free of the lictor, he appealed to the people to defend him. Niebuhr, vol. II, pp. 207–210 (Schmitz, trans.).

At this point, the fury of the mob drove the consuls and their lictors from the forum; the lictors were manhandled, and their fasces broken; the consuls took refuge in the senate house, as the senate deliberated its response. Over the objections of the hard-liners, the senior members prevailed, and took no further actions against the people. For his courage in resisting an unjust order, knowing that it might lead to his death, Publilius became a hero to the people, and was elected one of the tribunes of the plebs for the following year.

== Legislation ==
As tribune in 472 BC, Publilius surprised the aristocrats, who expected him to foment violence between the classes, by instead choosing a peaceful course of action. He proposed a law transferring the election of the tribunes of the plebs from the comitia centuriata, the oldest of the assemblies, which conferred imperium on magistrates, to the comitia tributa, considered a more democratic assembly. Voting strength in the comitia centuriata was determined by age and property, and the assembly tended to reflect the wishes of the aristocracy, a problem that only increased with the passage of time. Voting in the comitia tributa was done by tribes, with each tribe receiving an equal vote. Although neither the senate nor the consuls favoured the law, they could do nothing to block it. Nonetheless, debate over the law consumed the rest of the year, and the proposal carried over to the following year.

In 471, Publilius and his colleagues continued to press for the passage of his proposal, and raised a second issue. The number of the tribunes of the plebs was not fixed by law; originally two had been appointed following the creation of the office, but they had co-opted two colleagues to serve alongside them, and assist with their duties. The new proposal would officially raise the number of elected tribunes to five. Publilius' colleague, Gaius Laetorius, who had also been a soldier of high reputation, spoke passionately and vociferously in favour of the two laws. But as an unpractised orator, his rhetoric became inflammatory, and on the day appointed for voting, he and the consul Appius Claudius had a violent confrontation, in which each man attempted to arrest the other. Public sympathy was against Claudius, who was well known as the champion of the aristocracy, and he was hurried out of the forum by his colleague, the moderate Titus Quinctius, who succeeded in calming the crowd.

In the senate, Claudius harangued those who either supported Publilius' legislation, or failed to oppose it as cowards and traitors; but the senate wisely chose to accede to the will of the people, and dropped its opposition. Publilius' laws were passed, becoming the Lex Publilia of 471 BC. The election of the tribunes of the plebs passed to the comitia tributa, and three new tribunes were elected to serve alongside Publilius and Laetorius. (Note: Diodorus reports that the number of tribunes was increased to four, not five.)

== Bibliography ==
- Titus Livius (Livy), Ab Urbe Condita (History of Rome).
- Dionysius of Halicarnassus, Romaike Archaiologia.
- Diodorus Siculus, Bibliotheca Historica (Library of History).
- Barthold Georg Niebuhr, The History of Rome, Julius Charles Hare and Connop Thirlwall, trans., John Smith, Cambridge (1828).
- Gilbert Abbott à Beckett, The Comic History of Rome, Bradbury, Evans, and Company, London (1850).
- Christian Matthias Theodor Mommsen, Römische Geschichte (History of Rome), Reimer & Hirsel, Leipzig (1854–1856).
- Harper's Dictionary of Classical Literature and Antiquities, Harry Thurston Peck, ed. (Second Edition, 1897).
- Frank Frost Abbott, A History and Description of Roman Political Institutions, Ginn & Company, Boston (1901).
- T. Robert S. Broughton, The Magistrates of the Roman Republic, American Philological Association (1952).
- Lily Ross Taylor, Roman Voting Assemblies: From the Hannibalic War to the Dictatorship of Caesar, The University of Michigan Press (1966), ISBN 0-472-08125-X.
- Oxford Classical Dictionary, N. G. L. Hammond and H. H. Scullard, eds., Clarendon Press, Oxford (Second Edition, 1970).
- Gary Forsythe, A Critical History of Early Rome, University of California Press (2006).
- Howard Hayes Scullard, A History of the Roman World: 753 to 146 BC, Routledge (2012).
