= Codex Salmasianus =

8th century Latin book

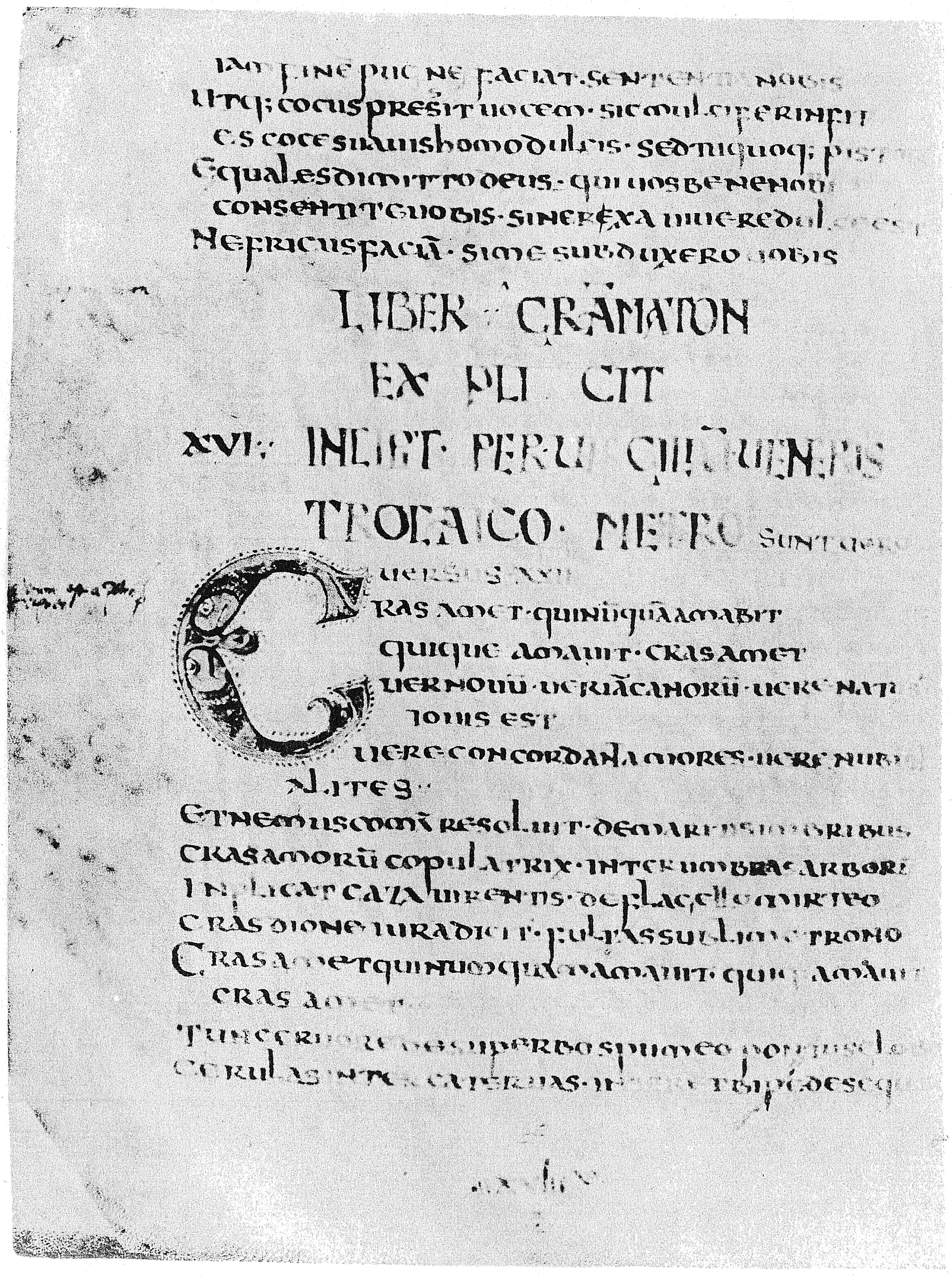
Beginning of the poem Pervigilium Veneris in the Codex Salmasianus

The Codex Salmasianus is a Latin uncial manuscript named after its former owner, the French philologist Claudius Salmasius (1588–1653). According to Alexander Riese, the codex dates to the 7th or probably to the 8th century.

Today it is a part of the French National Library at Paris (Codex Parisinus Latinus 10318). The Codex Salmasianus is the most important collection of minor Latin poems. It is denoted by the letter A in the editions of the Anthologia Latina (Riese 1894, Shackleton Bailey 1982) and by the letter S in most editions of the Pervigilium Veneris.

It is also named Carmina Codicis Parisini 10318 Olim Salmasiani ["Poems of the Paris Codex 10318, Formerly [belonging to] Salmasianus"].
