= Alexander Riese =

German classical scholar

Alexander Riese (2 June 1840, Frankfurt – 8 October 1924, Frankfurt) was a German classical scholar. An R, after his surname, indicates the canonical numeration for poems surviving in the Anthologia Latina, of which he edited into a more critically accurate collection than the original nucleus.

== Biography ==
He was born in Frankfurt am Main and received his education at the universities of Erlangen, Bonn and Berlin. Following graduation he served as an adjunct at the Joachimsthalsches Gymnasium in Berlin. In 1864 he obtained his habilitation and four years later became an associate professor at the University of Heidelberg. From 1868 he served as a senior teacher at the gymnasium in Frankfurt, where in 1871 he attained the title of professor.

Besides his editions of Varro's Satiræ Menippeae (1865), of the Anthologia Latina (1869; second edition, 1894), of Ovid (3 parts, 1871–74), of the Historia Apollonii Regis Tyri (1871, second edition, 1893), of Catullus (1884, "Die Gedichte des Catullus"), and of Phaedrus (1885), he published a suggestive essay, Idealisierung der Naturvölker des Nordens in den griechischen und römischen Litteraturen (1875), and two monographs on early German history, Das Rheinische Germanien in der antiken Litteratur (1892) and Das Rheinische Germanien in den antiken Inschriften (1914).
