= Lex Publilia (471 BC) =

Ancient Roman law

The lex Publilia, also known as the Publilian Rogation, was a law traditionally passed in 471 BC, transferring the election of the tribunes of the plebs to the comitia tributa, thereby freeing their election from the direct influence of the Senate and patrician magistrates.

== Background ==
In 473 BC, the tribune Gnaeus Genucius ordered the arrest and trial of Gnaeus Manlius Vulso and Lucius Furius Medullinus, the consuls of the previous year, for having used their power to obstruct agrarian reforms. Genucius was already hated by the patricians; Titus Genucius, probably his brother, having brought to trial Titus Menenius Lanatus, who as consul in 477 had failed to intervene to prevent the disaster at the Cremera, and Spurius Servilius Priscus Structus, who during his consulship in 476 had nearly lost his entire army due to his recklessness. Before their trial, Manlius and Furius appeared in public in mourning dress, bewailing their fates, which they claimed had already been ordained by the tyranny of the plebeian tribunes, which rendered anyone elected to high office little more than sacrificial animals. Their appeal to their supporters succeeded, for on the day of the trial Genucius was found murdered in his house. (Note: Such is the account given by Livy, who is followed by most modern historians. Dionysius, however, denies that Genucius was murdered, stating that no sign of violence was found on the tribune's body.)

The new consuls, Lucius Aemilius Mamercus and Vopiscus Julius Iulus, (Note: Some sources give Opiter Verginius Tricostus in place of Vopiscus Julius Iulus.) were ordered to levy troops as a distraction from the murder, and the other tribunes were too fearful to intervene. When a former centurion named Volero Publilius refused to be enlisted as a common soldier, the consuls had him arrested and ordered him to be scourged by the lictors. Breaking free, Publilius appealed to the crowd for protection, and suddenly the tables were turned against the consuls, who fled for their lives and took refuge in the Curia Hostilia. Faced with the prospect of imminent revolt, the Senate refrained from taking any further action against the plebeians, and Publilius was elected tribune for the following year.

== Publilius' Rogation ==
As tribune of the plebs in BC 472, Publilius proposed a law transferring the election of the plebeian tribunes from the comitia curiata (or possibly the comitia centuriata) to the comitia tributa. (Note: Cicero says that the tribunes were originally elected by the comitia curiata, which is implied, but not explicitly stated by passages in Livy and Dionysius. Niebuhr, however, argues that they were probably elected by the comitia centuriata, and that the comitia curiata merely confirmed the choice of the centuries.) The significance of this measure was that it would prevent the patricians from influencing the election through the votes of their clientes. The proposal was debated throughout the year, but never passed.

The following year, Publilius brought the law forward for the second time. The debate was marked by a confrontation between the consul Appius Claudius Sabinus and Gaius Laetorius, one of the other plebeian tribunes, in which Laetorius tried to have Claudius removed before a vote could be held, and the consul ordered the tribune's arrest. Bloodshed was averted when the other consul, Titus Quinctius Capitolinus Barbatus, convinced a group of senators to hurry Claudius from the Forum, while he himself calmed the crowd. In the Senate, Quinctius urged the senators to defer to the will of the people rather than risk tearing the state apart. Despite his colleague's angry words, the opinion of Quinctius prevailed, and no further action was taken to obstruct the passage of the tribune's law.

== Historicity ==
Some scholars doubt that the patricians would have permitted the election of the plebeian tribunes to pass into the hands of the comitia tributa as early as traditionally reported. Instead, they argue that this was probably accomplished by the lex Publilia of 339 BC, which included three major provisions: opening the censorship to the plebeians; making plebiscita binding on the entire community, rather than just the plebeians; and reducing the power of the comitia curiata to obstruct laws before they were sent to the comitia centuriata. In this case, the lex Publilia of 471 BC would be merely an anticipation of the later law.

== See also ==
- Concilium Plebis
- Tribune of the Plebs
- Conflict of the Orders

== Bibliography ==
- Titus Livius (Livy), Ab Urbe Condita (History of Rome).
- Dionysius of Halicarnassus, Romaike Archaiologia.
- Diodorus Siculus, Bibliotheca Historica (Library of History).
- Barthold Georg Niebuhr, The History of Rome, Julius Charles Hare and Connop Thirlwall, trans., John Smith, Cambridge (1828).
- Dictionary of Greek and Roman Antiquities, William Smith, ed., Little, Brown, and Company, Boston (1859).
- Adolf Berger, Encyclopedic Dictionary of Roman Law, American Philosophical Society (1968), ISBN 978-0-87169-432-4.
- Oxford Classical Dictionary, N. G. L. Hammond and H. H. Scullard, eds., Clarendon Press, Oxford (Second Edition, 1970).
- Kurt A. Raaflaub, Social Struggles in Archaic Rome: New Perspectives on the Conflict of the Orders, John Wiley & Sons (2008), ISBN 978-1-4051-4889-4.
