= 407 =

407 in various calendars
- Gregorian calendar: 407; CDVII
- Ab urbe condita: 1160
- Assyrian calendar: 5157
- Balinese saka calendar: 328–329
- Bengali calendar: −187 – −186
- Berber calendar: 1357
- Buddhist calendar: 951
- Burmese calendar: −231
- Byzantine calendar: 5915–5916
- Chinese calendar: 丙午年 (Fire Horse); 3104 or 2897 — to — 丁未年 (Fire Goat); 3105 or 2898
- Coptic calendar: 123–124
- Discordian calendar: 1573
- Ethiopian calendar: 399–400
- Hebrew calendar: 4167–4168
- Hindu calendars
- Vikram Samvat: 463–464
- Shaka Samvat: 328–329
- Kali Yuga: 3507–3508
- Holocene calendar: 10407
- Iranian calendar: 215 BP – 214 BP
- Islamic calendar: 222 BH – 221 BH
- Javanese calendar: 290–291
- Julian calendar: 407; CDVII
- Korean calendar: 2740
- Minguo calendar: 1505 before ROC 民前1505年
- Nanakshahi calendar: −1061
- Seleucid era: 718/719 AG
- Thai solar calendar: 949–950
- Tibetan calendar: མེ་ཕོ་རྟ་ལོ་ (male Fire-Horse); 533 or 152 or −620 — to — མེ་མོ་ལུག་ལོ་ (female Fire-Sheep); 534 or 153 or −619

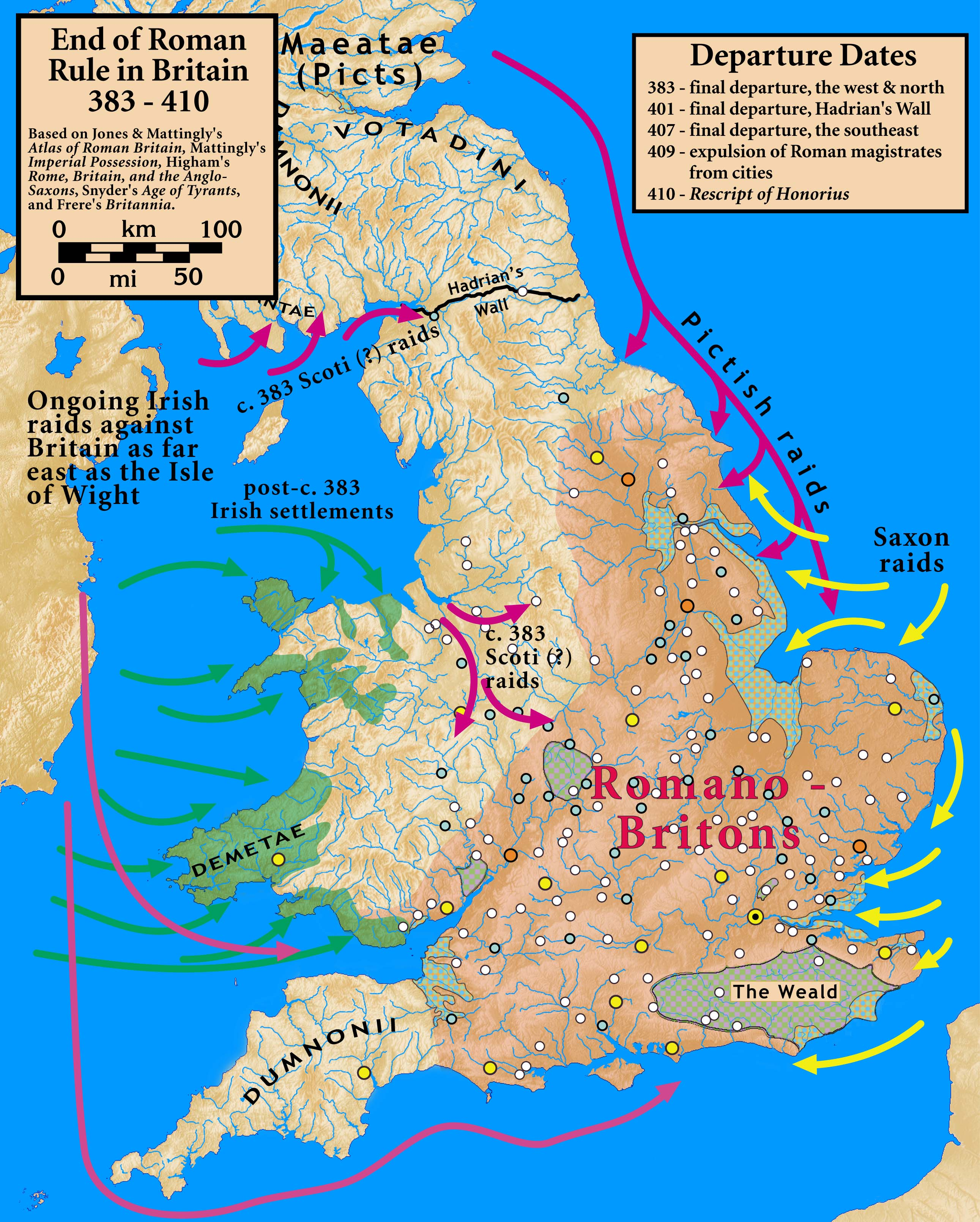
End of Roman rule in Britain

Year 407 (CDVII) was a common year starting on Tuesday of the Julian calendar. At the time, it was known as the Year of the Consulship of Honorius and Theodosius (or, less frequently, year 1160 Ab urbe condita). The denomination 407 for this year has been used since the early medieval period, when the Anno Domini calendar era became the prevalent method in Europe for naming years.

== Events ==
=== By place ===
==== Roman Empire ====
- Gratian, Roman usurper, is installed as emperor after the death of Marcus. According to Orosius, he is a native Briton of the urban aristocracy.
- Gratian is assassinated.
- Roman Civil war of 407–415:Constantine III, a general (magister militum), declares himself Roman emperor. To extend his dominion over Gaul and Spain, he takes practically all the Roman garrisons from Britain and crosses the English Channel. Constantine occupies Arles and establishes tenuous authority over Gaul, sharing control with marauding "barbarians". This is generally seen as the beginning of Rome's withdrawal from Britain.
- Autumn - Resistance of Honorius cousins: In Spain comes Constans II into conflict with Didymus and Verinianus, nephews and followers of Honorius.
- End of Roman rule in Britain: After 360 years of occupation, the local regional British-Roman leaders raise their own levies for defence against Saxon sea rovers. They cultivate oysters, having learned the technique from the Romans.

==== China ====
- Liu Bobo (Xia Wuliedi) founds the state of Xia, and claims the title "Heavenly Prince" (Tian Wang).

== Births ==
- Wen Di, Chinese emperor of the Liu Song dynasty (d. 453)

== Deaths ==
- Fu Xunying, empress of the Xianbei state Later Yan
- Gratian, Roman usurper
- John Chrysostom, archbishop of Constantinople
- Marcus, Roman usurper
- Maria, empress consort and wife of Honorius
- Murong Xi, emperor of the Xianbei state Later Yan (b. 385)
- Victricius, missionary and bishop of Rouen (approximate date)
