= Battle of Vienne =

411, in France, Roman Civil War of 407–415

- Part of Roman civil war of 407–415
Date	spring 411
Location	Vienne, current France
Result	victory of Gerontius

Belligerents
Constans II	Maximus

Commanders and leaders
Justus	Gerontius

Strength
± 5,000-10,000	10,000-15,000

The battle of Vienne took place in early 411 between the armed forces of Gerontius, who had unleashed an uprising, and co-emperor Constans II, whose attempt to invoke the rebellion failed and fled. The battle of Vienne is in fact the final piece in this event, in which Constans was killed.

== Background ==
The fightings between the Roman armys are an episode of the Roman civil war of 407–415 in which several military confrontations took place between different opponents and with changing targets. Our sources tells us only that this battle took place and that Constans II was defeated and died shortly after. This lack of details is due to the fact that the most important writers of this period - Olympias of Thebes, Orosius and Prosper Tiro - this event only briefly mention, and that also applies to the later summaries of Sozomen and Zosimus. For them, it was part of a broader political and military context.

During the Roman civil war of 407–415 had Constantine III appointed his son co-emperor. He sent Constans to Spain to establish his authority there, a task he successfully accomplished. In 409, Constans returned to the court in Arles. The exact reason for this is missing, but is undoubtedly related to the instability of their empire. Roman troops had moved away from the borders, the government substandard and local elite took the initiative - factors that involved new uprisings. From a dynastic point of view, the presence of his son was therefore important to Constantine. Nevertheless, a rebellion came from an unexpected angle. In Spain, Gerontius, general of Constant's army, turned against the regime.

== The campaign of Constans ==
=== Confrontation in Spain ===
In the summer of 409, Constans returned to Spain with an army. Whether this took place before the revolt of Gerontius or in response to it is unclear. According to Zosimus, who states that Gerontius feared for the military strength of Constans, he prompted the barbarian groups (who had been in northwestern Gaul since the Rhine crossing) to move to the south, where they destroyed the rich areas of Aquitaine and Narbonensis.

Regarding the further course of the campaign, the sources give little to no details. Historians assume that Gerontius mainly focused on the arrival of Constans and therefore left the Pyrenees passes unguarded. Nor is it clear where and how both armies met. According to Michael Kulikowski, Constans' campaign took up most of 410. The outcome of the confrontation between Constans and Gerontius was clear, much of Constans' army transferred to Gerontius.

=== Retreat to Arles ===
Without most of his troops, Constans had no choice but to retreat. Kulikowski points out that the sources testify to a withdrawal after an armed struggle had failed. Halfway through 410, Constans returned to Arles, after which he consulted with his father about the next steps. In addition to the threat of Gerontius, danger was also expected from Italy, but Gerontius was the greatest threat at that time. In the meantime, he had proclaimed Maximus counter-emperor in Spain and marched with his army towards Arles to end the reign of Constantine.

=== The Battle of Vienne ===
Constantine sent his son to war again, but was also defeated by Gerontius this time.It is believed that this battle took place somewhere along the route from Arles to Spain. As for the size of the armies, we are groping in the dark and only speculation remains, with Gerontius army being larger than Constans. Drinkwater who wrote extensively about Constantine III explicitly avoids figures for the field armies. Other historians do the same. However, there is consensus that there were no huge armies, not 30,000-50,000 men, but also not several thousand, rather armies of approximately 10,000-15,000 men

After his defeat, Constans sought refuge in Vienne, but Gerontius chased him and in the battle that may be taking place near or in the city, he defeated Constans and killed him.

== Consequences ==
The defeat of Constantus led to a serious weakening of the regime of Constantine III. In addition to losing his son and fellow emperor, much of his army transferred to Gerontius and his authority in Spain collapsed. This gave Gerontius the strategic upper hand and the emperor became more and more cornered. As a result, the road to Arles was opened. He could advance and besiege the center of power of Constantine. In the end, all this directly contributed to the downfall of Constantine III himself.

== See also ==
- Battle of Arles (411)

== Sources ==
- Orosius, Historiae adversus paganos
- Zosimus, Historia Nova
- Olympiodorus, Fragments
- Sozomenus, Historia Ecclesiastica

== Bibliography ==
- Drinkwater, J. F. (1998). "The Usurpers Constantine III (407-411) and Jovinus (411-413)'". Britannia. Vol. 29. pp. 269–298.
- Kulikowski, Michael (1998). The end of Roman Spain (PhD thesis). University of Toronto.
- Jones, A.H.M.; Martindale, J. R.; Morris, J. (1971). The Prosopography of the Later Roman Empire. Cambridge University Press.
