= Didymus (family of Honorius) =

Didymus (died Arelate, 409) was a Roman nobleman who belonged to the house of Theodosius and close related to the Western Roman emperor Honorius. He was from Hispania and the brother of Verinianus, Theodosiolus and Lagodius.

According to Sozomenus, Didymus and his brother Verenian confronted each other for some time, but in 408 they reconciled and organized the armed resistance against the usurpers Constantine III and Constans II. They fought in Lusitania, where they were able to kill many soldiers of Constant II with an army consisting of locally stationed troops, farmers and slaves.

== See also ==
- Didymus and Verinianus
- Resistance of Honorius cousins

== Bibliography ==
- Jones, A.H.M.; Martindale, J. R.; Morris, J. A (1971). The Prosopography of the Later Roman Empire. Cambridge University Press.
