= 408 =

408 in various calendars
- Gregorian calendar: 408; CDVIII
- Ab urbe condita: 1161
- Assyrian calendar: 5158
- Balinese saka calendar: 329–330
- Bengali calendar: −186 – −185
- Berber calendar: 1358
- Buddhist calendar: 952
- Burmese calendar: −230
- Byzantine calendar: 5916–5917
- Chinese calendar: 丁未年 (Fire Goat); 3105 or 2898 — to — 戊申年 (Earth Monkey); 3106 or 2899
- Coptic calendar: 124–125
- Discordian calendar: 1574
- Ethiopian calendar: 400–401
- Hebrew calendar: 4168–4169
- Hindu calendars
- Vikram Samvat: 464–465
- Shaka Samvat: 329–330
- Kali Yuga: 3508–3509
- Holocene calendar: 10408
- Iranian calendar: 214 BP – 213 BP
- Islamic calendar: 221 BH – 220 BH
- Javanese calendar: 291–292
- Julian calendar: 408; CDVIII
- Korean calendar: 2741
- Minguo calendar: 1504 before ROC 民前1504年
- Nanakshahi calendar: −1060
- Seleucid era: 719/720 AG
- Thai solar calendar: 950–951
- Tibetan calendar: མེ་མོ་ལུག་ལོ་ (female Fire-Sheep); 534 or 153 or −619 — to — ས་ཕོ་སྤྲེ་ལོ་ (male Earth-Monkey); 535 or 154 or −618

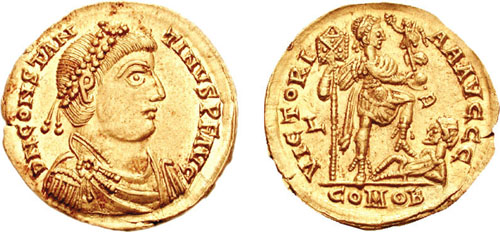
Emperor Constantine III (407–411)

Year 408 (CDVIII) was a leap year starting on Wednesday of the Julian calendar. At the time, it was known as the Year of the Consulship of Bassus and Philippus (or, less frequently, year 1161 Ab urbe condita). The denomination 408 for this year has been used since the early medieval period, when the Anno Domini calendar era became the prevalent method in Europe for naming years.

== Events ==
=== By place ===
==== Roman Empire ====
- May 1 – Emperor Arcadius dies in his palace at Constantinople, after a weak 13-year reign. He is succeeded by his 7-year-old son, Theodosius II, who rules under the domination of his devout Christian sister Pulcheria and Anthemius, who acts as regent.
- Summer – Emperor Honorius marries Thermantia, second daughter of Stilicho, his famous general (magister militum).
- Roman Civil war of 407–415:
  - The Roman usurper Constantine III establishes his headquarters at Arles (Southern Gaul) and elevates his eldest son, Constans, to the rank of Caesar. He sends him with an expeditionary force under Gerontius to Hispania, in order to suppress the revolt of some members of the Theodosian dynasty, who are loyal to Honorius.
  - August 13 – During a review of troops at Pavia, the soldiers stationed at this city murder the dignitaries present, then rage through the city, slaying anyone they suspected of being a supporter of Stilicho.
  - August 22 – Stilicho is accused of treason against Honorius and is decapitated at Ravenna. His Hun bodyguard is killed; mass murders of Vandal soldiers follow.
  - September – Rex Alaric I of the Visigoths crosses the Julian Alps with an army of 30,000 men, and marches into the Roman heartland. He lays siege to Rome, and Gothic auxiliaries desert to join Alaric's forces. After much bargaining, the Senate agrees to pay him a ransom of 5,000 pounds of gold, 30,000 pounds of silver, 4,000 silken tunics, and 3,000 hides dyed scarlet.
  - Alaric also demands, and obtains, the freedom of 30,000 people who had been enslaved in Rome.
- The Hexamilion wall is constructed. Fortifications are built across the Isthmus of Corinth, guarding the only land route into the Peloponnese peninsula from Greece.
- The Huns under Uldin cross the lower Danube and attack the Eastern Roman Empire, setting fire to frontier forts and taking control of the Castra Martis (modern Bulgaria). The Romans negotiate for peace, but Uldin demands an exorbitant gold tribute in return for his withdrawal. This demand is rejected and Anthemius forces the Huns back across the Danube.
- Attila, age 2, is sent as a child hostage to the court at Rome and in return, the Romans send Flavius Aetius to the Huns.

==== Persia ====
- King Yazdegerd I of Persia maintains cordial relations with the Roman Empire. He becomes an executor of Arcadius' will and is entrusted with the care of the young Theodosius II until he comes of age.

=== By topic ===
==== Medicine ====
- Alaric I exacts a tribute from Rome that includes 3,000 pounds of pepper. The spice is valued for alleged medicinal virtues and for disguising spoilage in meat that is past its prime.

== Births ==
- Tai Wu Di, emperor of the Northern Wei Dynasty (d. 452)

== Deaths ==
- May 1 – Arcadius, Roman emperor
- May 4 – Venerius, bishop of Milan and Saint
- August 22 – Stilicho, Roman general
