= AD 411 =

411 in various calendars
- Gregorian calendar: 411; CDXI
- Ab urbe condita: 1164
- Assyrian calendar: 5161
- Balinese saka calendar: 332–333
- Bengali calendar: −183 – −182
- Berber calendar: 1361
- Buddhist calendar: 955
- Burmese calendar: −227
- Byzantine calendar: 5919–5920
- Chinese calendar: 庚戌年 (Metal Dog); 3108 or 2901 — to — 辛亥年 (Metal Pig); 3109 or 2902
- Coptic calendar: 127–128
- Discordian calendar: 1577
- Ethiopian calendar: 403–404
- Hebrew calendar: 4171–4172
- Hindu calendars
- Vikram Samvat: 467–468
- Shaka Samvat: 332–333
- Kali Yuga: 3511–3512
- Holocene calendar: 10411
- Iranian calendar: 211 BP – 210 BP
- Islamic calendar: 218 BH – 216 BH
- Javanese calendar: 294–295
- Julian calendar: 411; CDXI
- Korean calendar: 2744
- Minguo calendar: 1501 before ROC 民前1501年
- Nanakshahi calendar: −1057
- Seleucid era: 722/723 AG
- Thai solar calendar: 953–954
- Tibetan calendar: ལྕགས་ཕོ་ཁྱི་ལོ་ (male Iron-Dog); 537 or 156 or −616 — to — ལྕགས་མོ་ཕག་ལོ་ (female Iron-Boar); 538 or 157 or −615

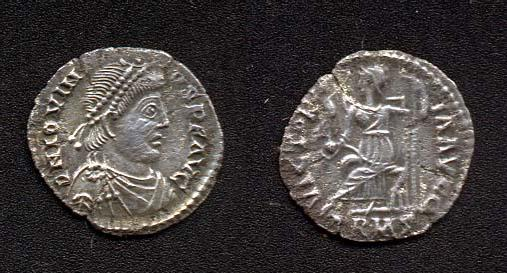
Emperor Jovinus (411–413)

Year 411 (CDXI) was a common year starting on Sunday of the Julian calendar. At the time, it was known in Rome as the Year of the Consulship of Theodosius without colleague (or, less frequently, year 1164 Ab urbe condita). The denomination 411 for this year has been used since the early medieval period, when the Anno Domini calendar era became the prevalent method in Europe for naming years.

== Events ==
=== By place ===
==== Roman Empire ====
- Roman Civil war of 407–415:
  - Battle of Vienne: Emperor Constantine III sends his son Constans II to stop the advance of Gerontius. Constans is defeated and killed.
  - Battle or siege of Arles: Emperor Honorius sends two Roman generals to deal with the usurper Constantine III in Gaul. They take over the army of Gerontius, Constantine's rebellious general (magister militum) who flees to Spain, then defeat Edobichus near Arles and defeat Constantine III. He is taken prisoner and put to death at Ravenna.
  - Following the defeat of Constantine III, the Burgundians and the Gallic nobility proclaim Jovinus, Gallo-Roman senator, emperor of the Western Roman Empire at Mogontiacum (modern Mainz).
  - King Ataulf leads the Goths into Gaul at the instigation of Honorius, who promises to recognise a Visigothic Kingdom if he defeats the several usurpers who threaten the Roman Empire.
- The Alans establish their rule in the Roman province of Lusitania (Portugal south of the Duero River and Spain).
- The Teutonic tribes in Spain join the Roman Empire as foederati (allies with military commitments).

==== Asia ====
- Ingyo succeeds his brother Hanzei, and becomes the 19th emperor of Japan.

=== By topic ===
==== Religion ====
- Rabbula becomes bishop of Edessa.
- The Councils of Carthage are held, on the issue of Donatism.

== Births ==
- Merovech, Founder of the Merovingian dynasty and grandfather of Clovis I (approximate date)

== Deaths ==
- September 18 – Constantine III, Roman usurper
- Constans II, usurper and son of Constantine III
- Gerontius, Roman general
- Gundomar I, king of Burgundy
- Yax Nuun Ahiin I, king of Tikal (Guatemala) (approximate date)
