= Geopolitics of the Roman Empire =

The Geopolitics of the Roman Empire deals with the "inalienable relationship between geography and politics of the Roman Empire". Once the Roman Empire had reached its natural borders, the location of potential threats to the empire and Roman troop locations played a major role in the elevation of Roman Emperors. Access to the troops, their location were crucial to the empire's internal politics, civil wars, and the eventual Fall of the Western Roman Empire.

== Political factors ==
=== Roman politics ===
When Octavian declared himself Augustus and became the first Roman emperor in 27 BC, it ended a six-decade period of great internal instability within Roman politics. Already the ascent of Julius Caesar and the first triumvirate had proven the loyalty of the Roman military to their individual commanders rather than to the polity.

The military commanders had also used conquest as a way to gain prestige, this can be seen in the first triumvirate; Pompey and his conquests in the East, Caesar in Gaul and Cassius's disastrous attempt to invade the Parthian Empire. The senate lost its own power and influence In the face of the personal military power of individuals and their popularity with the plebeian masses.

These trends continued into the second triumvirate, the political structure from which Octavian rose and then defeated to became Caesar. Both Octavian and his main rival in the second triumvirate, Mark Anthony had a loyal personal military. Mark Antony had also attempted a failed campaign into Parthia through Armenia.

=== Neighbouring polities ===
On the creation of the republic in 27 BC the empire was yet to reach its height. The Romans had pacified Gaul 20 years before during Caesars conquest and genocide of its people. His expedition into Germania at around the same time also stopped German incursions across the Rhine.

The only significant external power to the Romans was the Parthian Empire to the East. The two polities had strained ties, with Cassius and Mark Antony both leading failed invasions.

== Geographic factors ==
=== Natural borders of the Roman Empire ===
Roman Empire during Hadrian's reign

The Empire established by Augustus stayed consistent in territory for most of its history, though grew to permanently add Britannia through the campaign of Claudius and Dacia through Trajan's campaigns. Augustus had previously wanted the empire to incorporate territory until the Elbe river but changed his plans after the Battle of the Teutoburg Forest. Trajan also conquered Mesopotamia in addition to Dacia, but the territory was abandoned by the next emperor, Hadrian, who felt the territory would be too difficult and expensive to maintain against the Parthian Empire. The Empire's boundaries, therefore, were Hadrian's Wall (sometimes the Antonine Wall), the Rhine and Main rivers in the Western Empire. The Danube River in the middle empire. The mountains of Armenia and deserts of Syria to the East and the Sahara Desert and Atlas Mountains in Africa.

However, after the Battle of Adrianople and Theodosius's subsequent peace deal with the Goths the Rhine and Danube frontiers became incredibly porous. As per the peace deal, the victorious Goths retained their rights to pledge allegiance to their own King and retain their weapons, becoming in effect a separate state within the borders of the Roman Empire. Finding it harder to penetrate into the Eastern Roman Empire past the Bosporus, the Goths turned west. The Vandals, Franks and Alans would soon join the Goths in settling in Western Roman lands, while retaining their tribal allegiances and heritage.

== Fracturing of the empire ==
The divided Empire in 271

The Empire fractured on many occasions, the first and most noteworthy being after the death of emperor Valerian, when the empire split into three parts; the Gallic Empire in the west, the Palmyrene Empire in the east and a rump middle empire led by Valerian's son, Gallienus. Conflict between the empires was initially averted as they were too busy dealing with external threats and a plague to fight amongst each other. However, the fracturing of the empire forced a reorganisation which allowed each part to hold back whatever threat they faced. The Gallic Empire stopped Frankish invasions, the rump Roman empire defeated an Alemanni force invading Italia, and Palmyra in the east under the stewardship of Odaenathus successfully fought off the Sassanid Empire. Modern historians credit this fracturing of the Empire as the reason that the Roman Empire endured under a period of intense duress, postulating that the three empires did a much better job than one Empire headed by a single emperor would have been able to do.

Indeed, the size of the empire and the inability for a single emperor to be able to effectively address barbarian invasions as well as internal threats of usurpation is one of the reasons Diocletian created the Tetrachy and the empire eventually split into its Eastern and Western halves.

The empire would continue to fracture during 407 AD, dissatisfied troops in Britannia hailed Constantine III as Emperor of the west. He then reached Gaul where he campaigned against a group of Vandals, Alans and Suebi who had crossed the Rhine.

== Location of Roman capitals ==
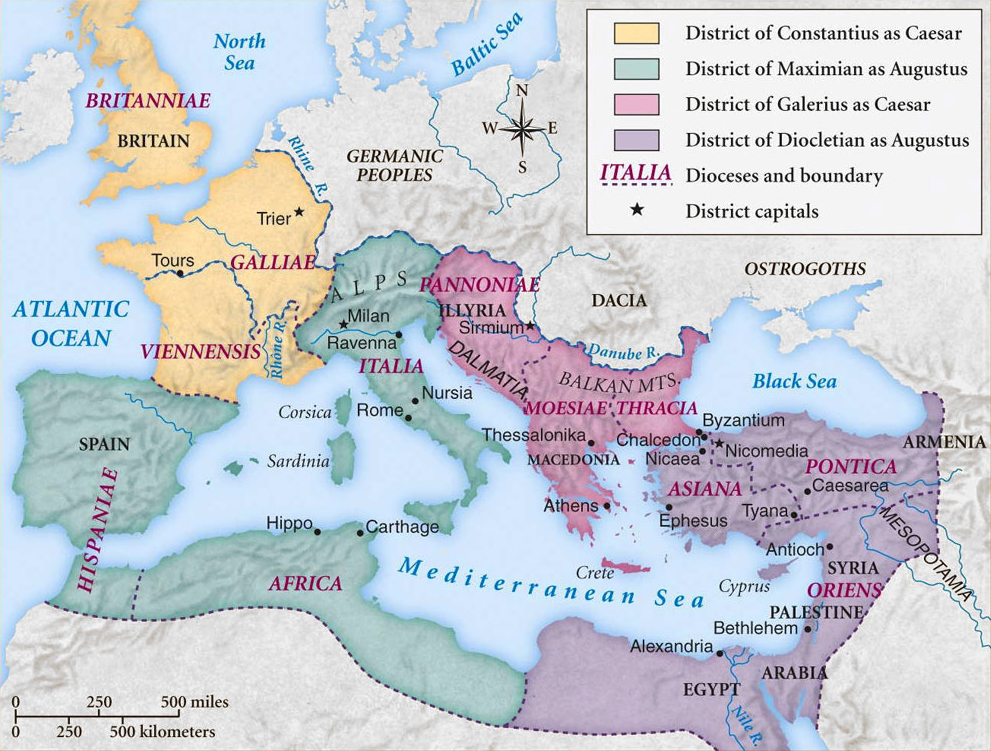
Map of the Roman Empire during the Tetrarchy system showing the districts and capital of each Tetrach

During the Crisis of the Third Century, the presence of the emperor was required near the front to both subdue any barbarian invasion and to deter any possible usurpation or dissatisfaction from the troops. While the court moved with the emperor, during the height of the crisis the de facto capital moved to Mediolanum, present day Milan. The city rose as due to its proximity to the frontiers of both the Rhine and Danube rivers, where the Alemanni and Goths tribes would stage invasions of Roman lands. Mediolanum was the a large hub city within a significant road network including the Via Helvetica into Switzerland and France, Via Claudia Augusta into Austria and Southern Germany, as well as close proximity to the Via Germanica towards the Rhine. As such Mediolanum could facilitate rapid military and administrative movements across the empire. An elite cavalry force (Comitatenses) founded by emperor Gallienus was based in Mediolanum and could quickly be mobilised to counter barbarian incursions.

When Diocletian became emperor and formed the Tetrachy, the four cities of Nicomedia, Mediolanum, Sirmium and Augustus Treverorum became capitals of the Roman Empire. The reasons for choosing each capital are given below:

Augustus Treverorum, present day Trier in Germany, was chosen due to its proximity to the militarily active Rhine frontier and being a large city in the region with the infrastructure required to support the legionaries of the area. It was located on Via Agrippa, which lead to the wealthy provinces in the South of France and close to the Via Germanica and Via Aquitania which lead towards the Atlantic coast of France.

Sirmium, in present-day Serbia, was chosen for its proximity to the Danube frontier, where there were incursions from Gothic tribes. It lay on a road network that included the Via Aurelia which to the Adriatic sea, Via Gemina and Via Militaris which ran through the spine of the Balkans to the Aegean Sea and Anatolia.

Nicomedia was chosen by Diocletian as his capital due to its more central location between Europe and Asia. Once again, it was close to several strategic roads that ran between the Balkans and Anatolia and into Syria. Though in Asia, Nicomedia was close to Europe. During Diocleatian's reign it became the Empire's most populated city.

When Constantine I became sole Emperor he built a new capital at Constantinople because of its site with easy access to the Danube and Euphrates frontiers able to meet the European barbarian and Sassanid threat respectively as well as its more defensible location than Nicomedia, surrounded as it was with water on three sides.

After the battle of Adrianople, the Rhine and Danube frontiers became incredibly porous and an independent horde of Goths were loose within the borders of the empire. Alaric I's siege of Milan in 403 was enough to persuade emperor Honorius to move the capital to a less exposed location. Ravenna became capital of the Western Empire as it was surrounded by marshes on all sides and harder to lay siege to. The city also had access to the Adriatic Sea at a time when Western Roman Empire's greatest threat, the Visigoths had not managed to attain maritime supremacy.

== External threats ==
Barbarian tribes living across the Rhine and Danube Rivers would often enter Roman territory for raids, attracted by the idea of plunder. This naturally led to the stationing of large numbers of troops on these frontiers to act both as defense and a deterrent. Similarly, the Parthian Empire to the east, later replaced by the Sassanids posed a large threat to Roman Syria and Egypt. Egypt was of particular importance to the empire due to its grain supply, so the Romans also left a large garrison in the east to counter this threat. The island of Britannia also had a large troop garrison to ensure the pacification of the many tribes inside and outside Roman territory.

=== Rivalries with Persia ===
==== Armenia ====
Geopolitically, Armenia was significant for the Roman Empire and the Persian Parthian and Sassanid Empires as it functioned as a crucial buffer zone. Control of Armenia would allow both parties to secure their borders while being able to project power into crucial provinces of their rivals. For the Romans, Armenia protected Persian incursions into the interior of Anatolia and Syria, both rich and important provinces for the empire. Armenia also sat on trade routes between Central Asia and Europe.

Both Romans and Persians tried to influence Armenia through the co-option of their royal family through marriage, as well through the support of client kings during periods of civil war, such as the Roman support of Tiridates I, which eventually lead to the Roman-Parthian War of 58-63 AD. Under Diocletion the Romans supported and installed Tiridates III as the King of Armenia, this again lead to war Roman–Sasanian War of 296–299 AD. At the end of this war, under the Peace of Nisibis the Romans also gained the right to appoint the Kings of Iberia, north of Armenia.

During the reign of Tiridates III, Christianity was proclaimed as the state religion, aligning the country more closely to Rome, especially after Constantine proclaimed the same for the Roman Empire.

==== Arab Kingdoms ====
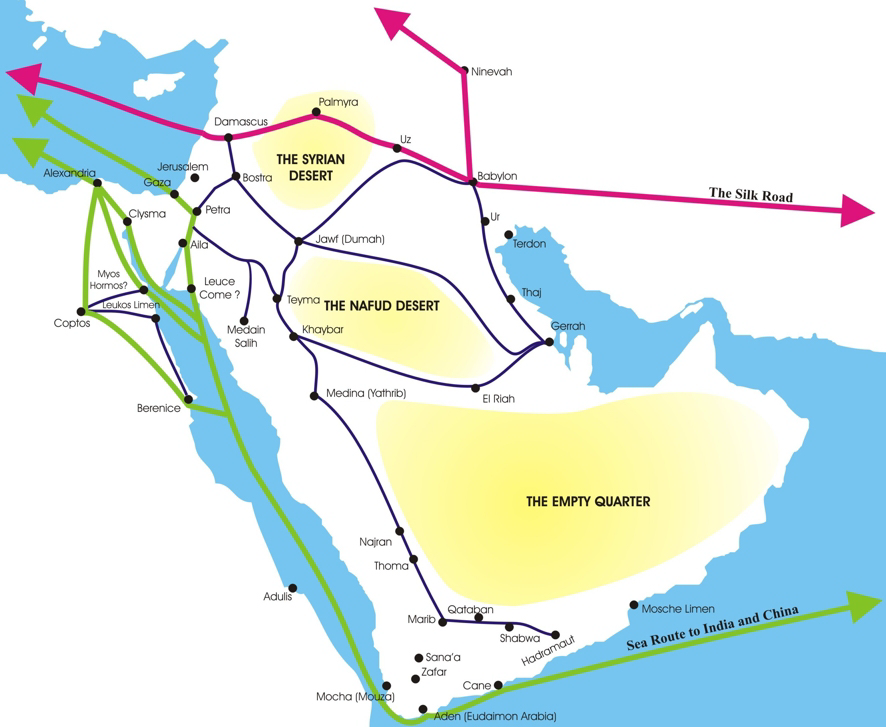
Trading routes of the ancient Middle East, when Petra was the last stop for caravans carrying spices before being shipped to European markets through the Port of Gaza

Another buffer zone existed further south, around the area of present-day Jordan. Here Arab peoples lived on trade routes that stretched between Yemen and Syria. These routes were part of the ancient Indian Ocean trade network and transported valuable goods like pepper (which the Romans highly prized), incense, and silk from Asia to the Mediterranean.

For the Romans, control of these trade routes were important as these goods were prized in the empire. Both empires forged alliances with local Arab tribes and kingdoms by promising economic incentives and often stationed troops in these regions. This was to ensure that the client states remained aligned with their suzerain's respective interests.

Until its annexation by Rome in 106 AD, the Nabatean Kingdom, with its capital at Petra, was a key Roman client state. The Nabateans controlled crucial trade routes and provided a buffer against desert tribes and rival powers.

From around 200 AD the Ghassanids were a powerful Arab Christian tribe which allied with the Roman Empire and later Eastern Roman Empire. They served as a buffer against the Persian-aligned Lakhmids and helped defend the frontiers of the Roman Palestine and especially the incredibly wealthy and agriculturally productive province of Egypt from Persia.

== Internal threats ==
Client armies emerged from the prolonged civil wars in the late republic—themselves fought between armies which believed they were defending the republic—and generals' attempts to secure military loyalty with pay increases. This trend continued through successive emperors and reached its zenith during the crisis of the third century, when the support of legionaries was the crucial factor of a potential emperor's successful bid for power and longevity of reign.

With this in mind, the most powerful individuals in the Empire after the Emperor himself were usually those in command of areas with large troop garrisons, or access to these areas. Historically these areas were the Danube frontier, the Rhine, the far east of the empire and Britannia.

IMPERIAL ROMAN ARMY: Summary of known deployments c. AD 130
Province	Approx. modern equivalent	Alae (no. mill.)	Cohortes (no. mill.)	Total aux. units	Auxiliary infantry	Auxiliary cavalry*	No. legions	Legionary infantry	Legionary cavalry	TOTAL GARRISON
Britannia	England/Wales	11 (1)	45 (6)	56	25,520	10,688	3	16,500	360	53,068
Rhine Frontier
Germania Inferior	S Neth/NW Rhineland	6	17	23	8,160	4,512	2	11,000	240	23,912
Germania Superior	Pfalz/Alsace	3	22 (1)	25	10,880	3,336	2	11,000	240	25,456
Total Rhine Forces		9	39 (1)	48	19,040	7,848	4	22,000	480	49,368
Danube Frontier
Raetia/Noricum	S Ger/Switz/Austria	7 (1)	20 (5)	27	11,220	5,280	1	5,500	120	22,120
Pannonia (Inf + Sup)	W Hungary/Slovenia	11 (2)	21 (4)	32	11,360	8,304	3	16,500	360	36,524
Moesia Superior	Serbia	2	10	12	4,800	1,864	2	11,000	240	17,904
Moesia Inferior	N Bulgaria/coastal Rom	5	12	17	5,760	3,520	3	16,500	120	25,780
Dacia (Inf/Sup/Poroliss)	Romania	11 (1)	32 (8)	43	17,920	7,328	2	11,000	240	36,488
Total Danube Forces		36 (4)	95 (17)	131	51,060	26,296	11	60,500	1,080	138,816
Eastern Frontier
Cappadocia	Central/East Turkey	4	15 (2)	19	7,840	3,368	3	16,500	360	28,068
Syria (inc Judaea/Arabia)	Syria/Leb/Palest/Jordan/Israel	12 (1)	43 (3)	55	21,600	10,240	5	27,500	600	59,940
Total Eastern Forces		16 (1)	58 (5)	74	29,440	13,608	8	44,000	960	88,008
North Africa
Aegyptus	Egypt	4	11	15	5,280	3,008	2	11,000	240	19,528
Mauretania (inc Africa)	Tunisia/Algeria/Morocco	10 (1)	30 (1)	40	14,720	7,796	1	5,500	120	28,136
Total African Forces		14 (1)	41 (1)	55	20,000	10,804	3	16,500	360	47,664
Internal provinces		2	15	17	7,200	2,224	1	5,500	120	15,044
TOTAL EMPIRE		88 (7)	293 (30)	381	152,260	71,468	30	165,000	3,600	392,328

Notes: (1) Table excludes c. 4,000 officers (centurions and above). (2) Auxiliary cavalry nos. assumes 70% of cohortes were equitatae

Analysis

1. The table shows the importance of auxiliary troops in the 2nd century, when they outnumbered legionaries by 1.5 to 1.
2. The table shows that legions did not have a standard complement of auxiliary regiments and that there was no fixed ratio of auxiliary regiments to legions in each province. The ratio varied from six regiments per legion in Cappadocia to 40 per legion in Mauretania.
3. Overall, cavalry represented about 20% (including the small contingents of legionary cavalry) of the total army effectives. But there were variations: in Mauretania the cavalry proportion was 28%.
4. The figures show the massive deployments in Britannia and Dacia. Together, these two provinces account for 27% of the total auxilia corps.

=== List of commanders declared Emperor by their legions ===
Below is a list of Roman commanders who rose through the ranks of their respective legions to either rule the Empire, or form smaller breakaway empires.

==== List of commanders declared Emperor by the British legions ====
Britannia accounted for an eighth of the Roman Army at its height but the island was isolated from the continent, although there were significant troops on the island, the chances of a claimant emperor were small unless they could get the support of the Rhine legions too. Finally, neglected by the empire and unable to campaign and win plunder, dissatisfaction lead to troops in Britannia joining the barbarian plundering of the island they were meant to protect during the Great Conspiracy as well as a series of usurpers culminating in the declaration of Constantine III as Augustus in 407 AD.

- Clodius Albinus 193 AD, 196 AD
- Carausius 286 AD, ruler of Britain for seven years during the Carausian Revolt
- Constantine I 306 AD, founder of the Constantinian dynasty
- Marcus 407 AD
- Gratian 407 AD
- Constantine III 407 AD, removed the legionaries from Britannia to fight in Gaul.

==== List of commanders declared Emperor by the Rhine legions ====
The Rhine Legions were a formidable force, usually battle hardened and still close enough to Rome to exert influence.

- Vitellius 69 AD
- Valerian 253 AD
- Postumus 260 AD, founder of the Gallic empire
- Julian 355 AD

==== List of Commanders declared Emperor by the Eastern Legions ====
The Eastern Legions, although numerous found themselves far from Rome and therefore harder to exert influence on the politics of Rome

- Vespasian 69 AD, founder of the Flavian dynasty
- Pescennius Niger 193 AD
- Macrianus Major 259 AD
- Macrianus Minor 260 AD
- Vaballathus 267 AD, Ruler of the Palmyrene Empire
- Jovian 363 AD

==== List of Commanders declared Emperor by the Danube legions ====
The Danube Legions were the most powerful legionary force, they were the most numerous out of all the frontier forces, were usually battle hardened and could rely on their proximity to Rome to enable their candidate's succession.

- Septimius Severus 193 AD, founder of the Severan dynasty
- Maximinus Thrax 235 AD
- Decius 249 AD
- Trebonianus Gallus 251 AD
- Aemilianus 253 AD
- Ingenuus 260 AD
- Regalianus 260 AD
- Probus 276 AD

==== List of Commanders Who declared Emperor by the Comitatenses ====
The emperor Gallienus founded an elite cavalry force designed to quickly react to both internal (usurpations) and external (barbarian invasions) he based them in Milan and it was through them that the city gained stature and became de facto capital. Thus their status and location made them an incredibly powerful branch of the Roman military.

- Aureolus 268 AD
- Claudius Gothicus 268 AD
- Aurelian 270 AD, restorer of a unified Roman Empire after conquering the Gallic Empire and Palmyrene Empire
- Diocletian 284 AD, founder of the tetrachy

== Additional factors ==
=== Grain supplies ===
Throughout the Roman Empire the provinces of North Africa and Egypt were crucial to the Empire for their grain supply. Emperors would use a grain dole to win the support of the people of Rome and so control over these provinces were crucial. Augustus regarded Egypt with such importance that he made it a personal province to the Roman emperor, stationed legionaries under his direct command and made it law that any senator or general wishing to enter the province would first need the permission of the Emperor himself. Tacitus informs us that in 68 AD the governor of Africa, Clodius Macer was executed by Galba for threatening to cut the grain supply to Italy. [Ref: THE ROMAN EMPIRE AND THE GRAIN FLEETS: CONTRACTING OUT PUBLIC SERVICES IN ANTIQUITY BY MICHAEL CHARLES AND NEAL RYAN Queensland University of Technology]

Queen Zenobia's conquest of Egypt in 270 AD was a key reason that Aurelian marched on the Palmyrene Empire in 272 AD.

When the Empire split, North Africa was crucial to the Western Empire and Egypt to the Eastern for the same reasons. A defection of the governor of Africa, Gildo to the Eastern Roman Empire lead to war and Gothic King Alaric I who sacked Rome in 410 died while leading a campaign into Africa to cut the then Western Empire's grain supply. Similarly, in 408 AD a delay in the grain supply from Egypt to Constantinople lead to riots. And the Bishops of Alexandria, who held sway over the seaman's union of the port would use the leverage of grain supply to threaten Eastern Roman Emperors from time to time.[Ref: Paul Johnson A History of Christianity].

=== Mineral deposits ===
Hadrian had considered abandoning Trajan's conquest of Dacia, as he felt the salient was too difficult to defend but the presence of gold and silver mines in the region made its conquest lucrative. The depletion of the mines and its difficulty to defend was a major reason that emperor Aurelian abandoned the province in 275 AD, bringing the frontier back to the Danube river.

Britannia was also conquered in part due to its gold, silver and tin deposits but its island remoteness was a major reason for isolation during the Great Conspiracy and Carausian Revolt, its neglect and eventual withdrawal by Roman emperors.
