= Conscience of the King =

Book by Alfred Duggan

- First edition (publ. Faber & Faber)
- Author: Alfred Duggan
- Genre: Historical fiction
- Publication date: 1951

Conscience of the King (1951) is a historical novel by British author Alfred Duggan based on the life of Cerdic Elesing, founder of the Kingdom of Wessex. It begins 40 years after the events covered in The Little Emperors (also 1951), set during the last years of Roman Britain from 406 to 410 CE. His later novel The King of Athelney (1962) concerns one of Cerdic's most famous descendants, Alfred the Great.

== Plot ==
The story begins with Cerdic's birth in 451 CE, ending shortly before his death in 534 CE. Britain now consists of small states battling each other while also fighting off Danes, Irish, Picts, Jutes, Angles and Saxons. Cerdic (whose Roman name is Coroticus) is the youngest son of Eleutherus, King of the Regni, a territory in southern England roughly equivalent to modern East and West Sussex. Although raised as a Roman, his paternal grandfather was closely related to a Germanic ruler given land in Southern Britain around 370 CE in return for military service. This was common practice in the late Roman Empire and means he is at home in both cultures.

The novel purports to be Cerdic's personal memoir and essentially fictional, although certain characters and events are found in the historical record. He plans to deposit the manuscript in a ruined church, which means it will not be read for centuries and he can be completely honest. Cerdic feels true affection only for his son Cynric and does not hesitate to remove anyone else who stands in his way, including family members. This ruthlessness is a quality shared by others, including his brother and wife. He recognizes and values honour and loyalty in people such as the Romano-British leader Ambrosius Aurelianus and this makes him an interesting, multi-dimensional character.

The first part of the book covers Cerdic's life as a Romano-British noble; he is a generally loyal supporter of his father but frustrated by his lack of independence. This ends in his mid-20s when he murders his eldest brother Constans in a dispute over loot and has to flee. He passes himself off as a Saxon, concealing his real name and background and makes his way to Frisia in the modern Netherlands. He becomes chief advisor to the Saxon leader Aella, marries and has a son, Cynric. He persuades Aella to invade his father's kingdom and after several years, they storm the capital of Anderida and slaughter the inhabitants, including his father and second brother Paul; the Anglo-Saxon Chronicle dates this to 491 CE.

Unfortunately, Cerdic is recognised by one of the defenders and banished by Aella for his role in the deaths of his brothers and father, for which he would be punished by the gods and better not to be around when it happens. He views this as an excuse used by Aella to get rid of a dangerous rival but accepts the decision and returns to Frisia. There he recruits another army to invade the lands west of his former homeland, roughly modern Hampshire and Dorset (495 CE per the Anglo-Saxon Chronicle). During the voyage, he overhears his wife plotting his assassination and throws her overboard; the rest of the book covers his long and ultimately successful battle to establish the Kingdom of Wessex and his own dynasty. It ends with him musing that if the Christian faith in which he was brought up is true, he will spend certainly eternity in Hell but 'it was fun while it lasted.'

== Relation to other works ==
Cerdic's desire for independence is a recurring theme in Duggan's work, as is what happens when one form of society is replaced by another. Here it is Roman Britain, elsewhere the Roman Republic becoming an Empire (Three's Company, Winters Quarters) or the Byzantine Empire giving way to the Crusaders (The Lady for Ransom, Count Bohemund). Duggan has a great ability to convey different perspectives and the novel contains clues suggesting it can be seen as reversion, not just decay. For example, 'Regni' was the name of the pre-Roman British tribe who lived in the same area, while 'Coroticus' is often interpreted as a variation of Caratacus the British chief who led opposition to the Roman invasion of 43 CE.

The Little Emperors ends with the Roman protagonist concluding most Britons had a better life without 'Roman civilisation,' which was confirmed by a 2014 study showing average life-span actually increased in Post-Roman Britain due to better diet. Similarly, in Conscience of the King Cerdic regrets the dirt and squalor of Saxon life but feels the freedom he gained more than compensates.

== Historical background ==
The main sources for Cerdic himself are from the Anglo-Saxon Chronicle, the Historia Brittonum and Geoffrey of Monmouth, all written centuries later and subject to selective editing. It is generally agreed that the number of references mean Cerdic was a real and important historical figure but we know very little else. This is also true of other historical characters referenced in the book like Aella, Vortigern, Vortimer, Hengist and Ambrosius.

The traditional Dark Ages view of Post-Roman Britain was driven by a reliance on the limited written sources cited above. The novel's portrayal of this period as far more complex has been confirmed by archaeological discoveries in the last 30 years and reassessment of the historical evidence. As he was writing in the late 1940s, this is a considerable achievement and the book builds logical and realistic scenarios based on the few facts available.

A good example is the treatment of Arthur or Artorios, a character whose historical existence is still debated. Unlike Ambrosius Aurelianus, Artorios is a minor character who never appears directly but Duggan provides a rare perspective of this figure from the Saxon side. Here he is a former soldier from the Byzantine army leading a band of mercenary cataphractarii or heavy cavalry who fight for the surviving Roman-British kingdoms. Their impact is huge compared to numbers but they require horses large enough to carry an armoured man; when the horses die out, this strategic advantage disappears. Duggan's approach was the basis for the plot of the 2004 film King Arthur, cited in its publicity as being based on 'the latest historical research.'
