= Resistance of Honorius cousins =

- Part of Roman civil war of 407–415
- Situation in Spain during the resistance
Date	407-408
Location	Diocese of Hispania
Result	victory Constantine III

Belligerents
Cousins of Honorius	Constantine III; Constans II

Commanders and leaders
Didymus and Verinianus	Terentius or Gerontius

The resistance of Honorius cousins is an episode in the Roman civil war of 407-415, in which resistance was made against the usurper Constantine III. This opposition was led by Didymus and Verinianus, close relatives of Emperor Honorius and owners of large estates in the Roman diocese of Hispania, present-day Spain.

== Background ==
At the beginning of the 5th century, the Western Roman Empire faced a combination of internal civil wars and external invasions. From Britain and Gaul, the usurper Constantine III had seized power and tried to extend his influence to Hispania. The Spanish provinces recognised him as their emperor. Orosius, a contemporary, stated that the usurper sent envants to Spain who were initially accepted as rulers, but that they were later opposed.

The father of Honourius, emperor Theodosius (379–395) was originating from the province Gallaecia (northwestern Hispania). In the vicinity of Cauca (present-day Coca, near Segovia his family had large estates. Didymus and Verinianus are known to be close relatives of Honorius, and to play a leading role in the resistance against Constantine III. Their performance is mainly known from the work of Orosius. In addition to the aforementioned cousins, he also mentions Lagodius and Theodosiolus as relatives, but their meaning is further unknown.

== Resistance against Constantine ==
According to Drinkwater was the attack of Sarus on Constantine at Valence and the knowledge that Stilicho, commander-in-chief of the Roman army, was preparing a second campaign, the direct reason for Didymus and Verianus to revolt . Their motivation is harder to explain. Clear evidence that Didymus and Verinian were in direct contact with the imperial court is missing. Still, their action was logical when this is placed in a broader context. Stilicho who dominated the imperial court was closely linked to the imperial family through his marriage with Serena a niece of Theodosius I.

=== Strength and army building of the cousins ===
Although Hispania had formally sided with Constantine, his actual military presence was lacking there. The Hispanic comitatenses in the region had largely been reduced, redistributed or simply disappeared into the chaos of the civil war. What remained military consisted mainly of city garrions and troops in charge of law enforcement. This resulted in a power vacuum in which local elites took the reins themselves. Orosius mentions that Didymus and Verinianus took the initiative to push aside the rebellion and the administration of Constantine. They gathered loyal forces and armed freed slaves and farmers from their domains. Their goal was to slow down the advancing army of Constantine III and to fight back where possible. For supplies they could fall back on the cities in the Ebro Valley. Kulikowski dates the revolts to late 407.

=== Confrontation in the Pyrenees ===
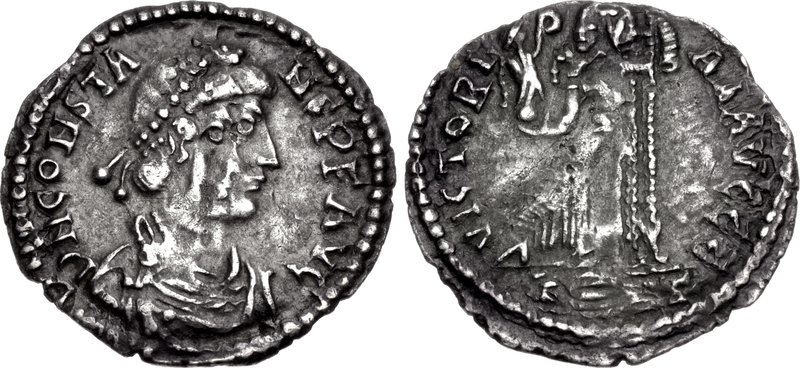
Coin of Constans II mintend in Arles

Constantine appointed his son Constans II as co-emperor and sent him with the experienced general Terentius at the head of an army to Hispania. In the Pyrenees region, the main access route from Gaul to Hispania, this army fought with the forces of Didymus and Verinianus. By effectively using the mountainous terrain, they managed to slow down the advance of Constans and initially achieved success .

=== End of the resistance ===
Start 408, Constantine sent additional troops to Hispania under the leadership of General Gerontius to break the resistance of the cousins. The battles presumably moved early 408 to the centre of Hispania, although this is not explicitly confirmed by sources. According to Kulikowski, a final battle took halfway 408 place in Lusitania. In the open field, the improvised army of Didymus and Verinanus lost its advantage. The lack of cavalry, organisation and a central military structure eventually led to the collapse of their forces, in the battle they were fight down. The defeat resulted in the capture of Didymus and Verinianus, while they tried to retreat to their core

== Aftermath and historical interpretation ==
The two aristocrats were transferred to Gaul, where they were executed by order of the regime of Constantine III. Their death marked the end of organised loyalist resistance in Hispania. From Honorius family is also known that Lagodius managed to escape to the east and that Theodosolus was captured.

Historians consider this episode to be illustrative of the broader developments in the Western Roman Empire in the early 5th century, including the weakening of central military structures, the increasing role of local elites in defence and governance, and the fragmentation of imperial control in border provinces. It shows that Roman authority under Honorius was very weak, that even relatives of the emperor had to equip their own armies locally.

== Sources ==
- Orosius, Historiae adversus paganos
- Zosimus, Historia Nova
- Olympiodorus, Fragments
- Sozomenus, Historia Ecclesiastica

== Bibliography ==
- Drinkwater, J.F.The Usurpers Constantine III (407-411) and Jovinus (411-413), in Britannia, Vol. 29 (1998), sides 269–298
- Kulikowski, Michael (1998), The end of Roman Spain, University of Toronto
