= Helena (Waugh novel) =

1950 novel by Evelyn Waugh

- First edition
- Author: Evelyn Waugh
- Language: English
- Genre: Historical novel
- Publisher: Chapman and Hall
- Publication date: 1950
- Publication place: United Kingdom
- Preceded by: The Loved One
- Followed by: Love Among the Ruins. A Romance of the Near Future

Helena, published in 1950, is the sole historical novel of Evelyn Waugh.

== Overview ==
In the preface, Waugh writes in part:

"The reader may reasonably inquire: how much is true? The Age of Constantine is strangely obscure. Most of the dates and hard facts, confidently given in the encyclopedia, soften and dissolve on examination. The life of St. Helena begins and ends in surmise and legend. The story is just something to be read; in fact, a legend."

It follows the quest of Empress Helena to find the relics of the cross on which Christ was crucified. Helena, a Christian, was the mother of the Roman emperor Constantine the Great.

The book has been described as lacking the characteristic biting satire for which Waugh is best known. However, the figure of Constantius Chlorus, Constantine's father, was interpreted by friends of the novelist as a caricature of Field-Marshal Bernard Montgomery, a man Waugh mocked as a vainglorious social climber. More generally, the corruption and instability of the Roman society Waugh describes is reminiscent of the malaise and pragmatism that prevails over tradition and chivalric ethics at the end of the Sword of Honour trilogy. Helena's saintliness does not allow her to save her son from an imperial destiny she fears and disapproves of (at one point she fantasises about him becoming a provincial colonel); nor is she able to save her innocent grandson Crispus from being murdered on Constantine's orders in a palace struggle.

The novel includes the tradition from Geoffrey of Monmouth that Helena was a British princess, daughter of King Coel.

Waugh always described Helena as his best work, but since his death, it has received little critical attention.

== See also ==
- Wandering Jew
- The Little Emperors

== Sources ==
- Drijvers, Jan Willem. "Evelyn Waugh, Helena and the True Cross." Classics Ireland 7 (2000).
