= Gerontius (magister militum) =

Western Roman general (d. 411)

Gerontius (fl. 407–411) was a general of the Western Roman Empire (with the rank of magister militum), who initially supported the usurper Constantine III, later betraying him in favour of another usurper, Maximus of Hispania.

== Life ==
=== Under Constantine III ===
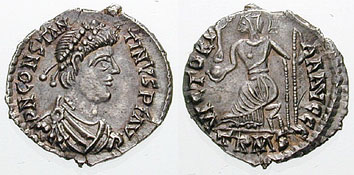
Siliqua of Constantine III. Struck 408–411 AD.

Gerontius, probably a Briton by birth, was one of the supporters of Constantine III, a Roman general who revolted against the emperor Honorius in 407, conquering Britain, Gaul, Germania, and Hispania.

Constantine's control of Hispania was challenged by the revolt of Didymus and Verinianus, cousins of Honorius. In early 408, Constantine sent an army against the rebels, headed by his son Constans and commanded by Terentius. After losing their first battles against the rebels, the Emperor sent Gerontius with additional forces from Gaul. He won an important victory in Lusitania, where Didymus and Verinianus were captured. Constans escorted the prisoners back to Gaul, while Gerontius remained in Hispania, in command of the local troops.

=== Usurpation of Maximus ===
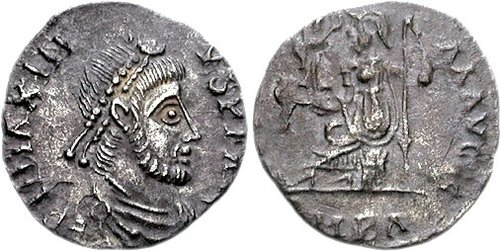
Coin of Maximus of Hispania, minted around 409-411 in Barcino (Barcelona)

In late spring 409, Gerontius rebelled against Constantine, who was now officially recognized as co-emperor by Honorius, and appointed Maximus as emperor. He moved to Tarraco, but left the city to oppose an invasion of Hispania by Constans, whom Constantine had newly appointed Augustus. Gerontius's motivations are unclear; the close timing of the revolt and of Constans's elevation to the throne suggests that one motivated the other, but it is not known which event came first.

To counteract Constantine, Gerontius allied with Vandals, Alans, and Suebi. A Frankish revolt occupied Constantine, who was forced to reduce his pressure on Gerontius, and the Franks and their allies entered Hispania, where they became a problem for Gerontius.

Gerontius successfully defended himself against Constans during 410. In 411, he successfully besieged and captured Constans in Vienne, executing him. He then moved on Arelate, where he besieged Constantine. However, while Constantine was still resisting, Honorius's general Constantius arrived from Italy with an army. Most of Gerontius's soldiers deserted and he was obliged to flee back to Hispania with a few loyal supporters.

According to Sozomen, the remaining troops turned on Gerontius once they knew of Gerontius's defeat, and blocked Gerontius and his wife into a house. Gerontius attempted to keep the aggressors away by shooting arrows at them from the roof. When his arrows ran out, the soldiers set fire to the house. Hopelessly defeated, he killed his wife before committing suicide.

=== Legacy ===
Gerontius' reliance on Vandals, Alans, and Suebi allies is considered the beginning of barbarian invasions in Hispania. Furthermore, the campaign led by Constantine III initially with troops from Roman Britain, including Gerontius, and the chaos brought to Gaul, according to Zosimus, "forced the inhabitants of Britain and some of the tribes in Gaul to secede from Roman rule and to be independent, obeying Roman laws no longer".

== See also ==
- Roman civil war of 407–415

== Sources ==
- Orosius, Historiae Adversum Paganos
- Zosimus, Historia Nova
- Olympiodorus, Fragments
- Sozomenus, Historia Ecclesiastica

== Bibliography ==
- Kulikowski, Michael (2004). Late Roman Spain and Its Cities. Johns Hopkins University Press. pp. 157–160. ISBN 0-8018-7978-7.
- Portaencasa, María FERNÁNDEZ (2020). "A Fifth-Century «Gallic Empire»: Hispania as Part of Constantine III's Usurpation". Studia Historica: Historia Antigua. 38: 217–243. doi:10.14201/shha202038217243. hdl:10366/144339. ISSN 2530-4100. S2CID 225126642.
- Drinkwater, J.F. The Usurpers Constantine III (407-411) and Jovinus (411-413), in Britannia, Vol. 29 (1998), sides 269–298
- Kulikowski, Michael (1998). The end of Roman Spain (PDF) (PhD thesis). University of Toronto.
- Martindale, John R., ed. (1980). The Prosopography of the Later Roman Empire: Volume II, AD 395–527. Cambridge: Cambridge University Press. ISBN 0-521-20159-4.
