= Geraint (given name) =

Geraint (/ˈɡɛraɪnt/ GHERR-eyent) is a Welsh name derived from the Latin name Gerontius. The original Geraint is a figure of Welsh history and legend. Geraint may also refer to:

== People ==
- Geraint of Dumnonia (died 710), Celtic king
- Geraint Anderson (born 1972), British newspaper columnist and son of Donald Anderson, Baron Anderson of Swansea
- Geraint Davies (Plaid Cymru politician) (born 1948), Welsh politician
- Geraint Davies (Labour politician) (born 1960), British politician
- Geraint Davies (rugby league) (born 1986), Welsh rugby player
- Geraint Talfan Davies (born 1943), Welsh journalist
- Geraint Wyn Davies (born 1957), Welsh actor and director
- Geraint Evans (1922–1992), Welsh singer
- Geraint Gruffydd (1928-2015), Welsh scholar
- Geraint Howells (1925–2004), British politician
- Geraint Jarman (1950–2025), Welsh musician
- Geraint H. Jenkins (1946–2025), historian of Wales
- Geraint Jones (born 1976), English cricketer
- Geraint F. Lewis (born 1969), British astrophysicist
- Geraint Lewis (born 1974), former Welsh international rugby union player
- Geraint Morgan (1920–1995), British politician
- Geraint Morris (1941–1997), Welsh film director
- Geraint Thomas (born 1986), Welsh cyclist
- Geraint Watkins (born 1951), Welsh musician
- Geraint Williams (born 1962), Welsh football player
- D. Geraint James (1922–2010), Welsh physician
- J. Geraint Jenkins (1929–2009), Welsh maritime historian and historian of rural crafts

== Fictional or invented characters ==
- Geraint the Blue Bard, a supposed medieval Welsh poet invented by Iolo Morganwg
- Geraint Cooper, father of Gwen Cooper in the television series Torchwood

== See also ==
- RFA Sir Geraint (L3027), British ship
