= End of Roman rule in Britain =

Transitionary period from 383-410

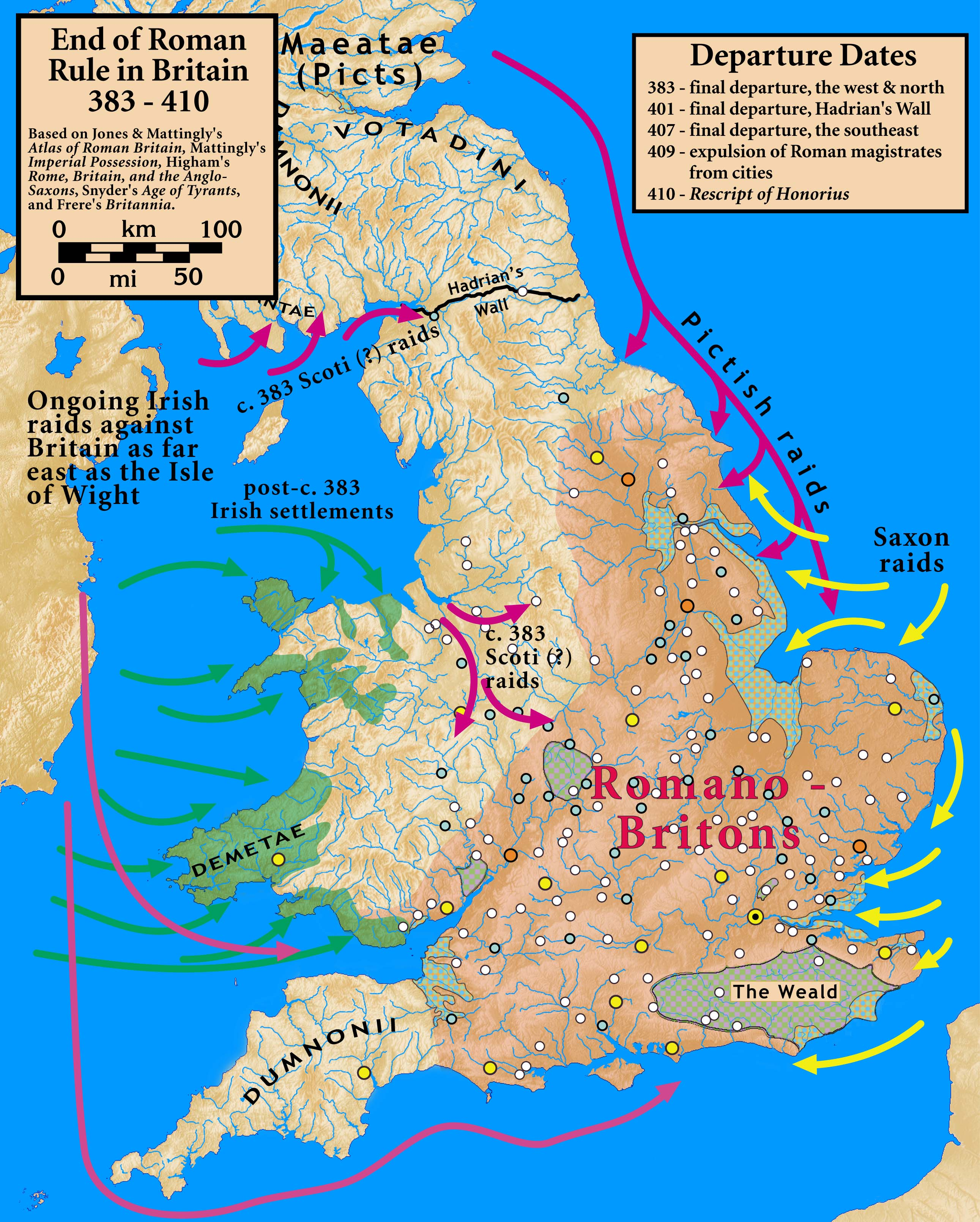
End of Roman rule, 383-410

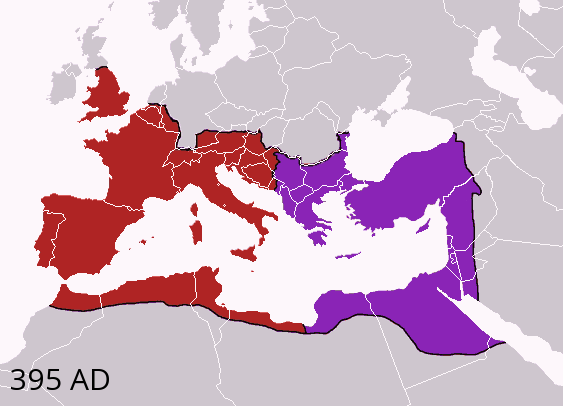
The Eastern and Western Roman Empire of Theodosius I in 395

Roman rule in Britain ended as Roman military forces withdrew to defend or seize the Western Roman Empire's continental core, leaving behind an autonomous post-Roman Britain. In 383, the usurper Magnus Maximus withdrew troops from northern and western Britain, probably leaving local warlords in charge. In 407, the usurper Constantine III took the remaining mobile Roman soldiers to Gaul in response to the crossing of the Rhine, and external attacks surged. The Romano-British deposed Roman officials around 410, and government largely reverted to city level. That year Emperor Honorius refused an appeal from Britain for military assistance. The following decades saw the collapse of urban life and the Anglo-Saxon settlement of Britain.

== Chronology ==
=== 383–388 ===
In 383, the Roman general then assigned to Britain, Magnus Maximus, launched his successful bid for imperial power, (Note: Snyder cites Zosimus 4.35.2-6 and 37.1-3, and Orosius (7.34.9-10), with the latter saying that Maximus was an unwilling usurper.) crossing to Gaul with his troops. He killed the Western Roman Emperor Gratian and ruled Gaul and Britain as Caesar (i.e., as a "sub-emperor" under Theodosius I). 383 is the last year for any evidence of a Roman presence in the north and west of Britain, (Note: Specifically, Frere refers to Wales, the western Pennines, and the fortress at Deva; he then goes on to suggest that the same was true north of Hadrian's Wall, referring to the lands of the Damnonii, Votadini, and the Novantae.) perhaps excepting troop assignments at the tower on Holyhead Mountain in Anglesey and at western coastal posts such as Lancaster. These outposts may have lasted into the 390s, but they were a very minor presence.

Coins dated later than 383 have been excavated along Hadrian's Wall, suggesting that troops were not stripped from it, as once thought or, if they were, they were quickly returned as soon as Maximus had won his victory in Gaul. In the De Excidio et Conquestu Britanniae, written c. 540, Gildas attributed an exodus of troops and senior administrators from Britain to Maximus, saying that he left not only with all of its troops, but also with all of its armed bands, governors, and the flower of its youth, never to return.

Raids by Saxons, Picts, and the Scoti of Ireland had been ongoing in the late 4th century, but these increased in the years after 383. There were also large-scale permanent Irish settlements made along the coasts of Wales under circumstances that remain unclear. Maximus campaigned in Britain against both the Picts and Scoti, with historians differing on whether this was in the year 382 or 384 (i.e., whether the campaign was before or after he became Caesar). Welsh legend relates that before launching his usurpation, Maximus made preparations for an altered governmental and defence framework for the beleaguered provinces. Figures such as Coel Hen were said to be placed into key positions to protect the island in Maximus's absence. As such claims were designed to buttress Welsh genealogy and land claims, they should be viewed with some scepticism.

In 388, Maximus led his army across the Alps into Italy in an attempt to usurp Theodosius as emperor. The effort failed when he was defeated in Pannonia at the Battle of the Save (in modern Croatia) and at the Battle of Poetovio (at Ptuj in modern Slovenia). He was then executed by Theodosius.

=== 389–406 ===
With Maximus's death, Britain came back under the rule of Emperor Theodosius I until 392, when the usurper Eugenius made a bid for imperial power in the Western Roman Empire until 394 when he was defeated and killed by Theodosius. When Theodosius died in 395, his 10-year-old son Honorius succeeded him as Western Roman Emperor. The real power behind the throne, however, was Stilicho, the son-in-law of Theodosius' brother and the father-in-law of Honorius.

Britain was suffering raids by the Scoti, Saxons, and Picts and, sometime between 396 and 398, Stilicho allegedly ordered a campaign against the Picts, likely a naval campaign intended to end their seaborne raids on the eastern coast of Britain. He may also have ordered campaigns against the Scoti and Saxons at the same time, but either way this would be the last Roman campaign in Britain of which there is any record.

In 401 or 402 Stilicho faced wars with the Visigothic king Alaric and the Ostrogothic king Radagaisus. Needing military manpower, he stripped Hadrian's Wall of troops for the final time. The year 402 is the last date of any Roman coinage found in large numbers in Britain, suggesting either that Stilicho also stripped the remaining troops from Britain, or that the Empire could no longer afford to pay the troops who were still there. Meanwhile, the Picts, Saxons and Scoti continued their raids, which may have increased in scope. In 405, for example, Niall of the Nine Hostages is described as having raided along the southern coast of Britain.

=== 407–410 ===
On the last day of December 406 (or, perhaps, 405), the Alans, Vandals, and Suebi living east of Gaul crossed the Rhine, possibly when it was frozen over, and caused widespread devastation.

As there was no effective Roman response, the remaining Roman military in Britain feared that a Germanic crossing of the Channel into Britain was next, and rebelled against Honorius's authority – an action perhaps made easier by the high probability that the troops had not been paid for some time. Their intent was to choose a commander who would lead them in securing their future but their first two choices, Marcus and Gratian, did not meet their expectations and were killed. Their third choice was the soldier Constantine III.

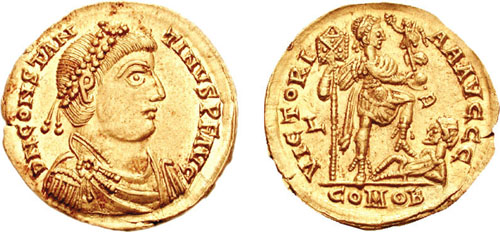
Gold coin of Constantine III

In 407, Constantine took charge of the remaining troops in Britain, led them across the Channel into Gaul, rallied support there, and attempted to set himself up as Western Roman Emperor. Honorius' loyalist forces south of the Alps were preoccupied with fending off the Visigoths and were unable to put down the rebellion swiftly, giving Constantine the opportunity to extend his new empire to include Hispania.

In 409, Constantine's control of his empire fell apart. Part of his military forces were in Hispania, making them unavailable for action in Gaul, and some of those in Gaul were swayed against him by loyalist Roman generals. The Germans living west of the Rhine River rose against him, perhaps encouraged by Roman loyalists, and those living east of the river crossed into Gaul. Britain, now without any troops for protection and having suffered particularly severe Saxon raids in 408 and 409, viewed the situation in Gaul with renewed alarm. Perhaps feeling they had no hope of relief under Constantine, both the Romano-Britons and some of the Gauls expelled Constantine's magistrates in 409 or 410. The Byzantine historian Zosimus (fl. 490s – 510s) directly blamed Constantine for the expulsion, saying that he had allowed the Saxons to raid, and that the Britons and Gauls were reduced to such straits that they revolted from the Roman Empire, 'rejected Roman law, reverted to their native customs, and armed themselves to ensure their own safety'.

The Visigoths, led by Alaric, launched an invasion of Italy in 407, culminating in a sack of Rome and the installation of a rival emperor, Attalus. Emperor Honorius, amid his battle to regain Italy, sent a rescript to British communities in 410 telling them to look to their own defence. However, there is a small chance that this message was for the Bruttians of southern Italy during Honorius' campaign against Alaric. Zosimus makes passing mention of this rescript while describing the reconquest of cities loyal to Attalus, and says nothing further about Britain. Historian Christopher Snyder wrote that protocol dictated that Honorius address his correspondence to imperial officials, and the fact that he did not implies that the cities of Britain were then the highest Roman authority remaining on the island.

At the time that the rescript was sent, Honorius had effectively lost Gaul and Spain, and risked losing Italy as well. He was in no position to offer relief to Britain. As for Constantine III, he was not equal to the intrigues of imperial Rome and by 411 his cause was spent. His son was killed along with those major supporters who had not turned against him, and he himself was assassinated.

=== 410 and after ===
410 is frequently named as the year in which "the Romans" or their "legions" left Britain, never to return, or for "the end of Roman Britain". However, twenty-first-century scholarship generally rejects the idea that Roman culture, civic administration, or military organisation ended abruptly in 410, rather seeing different kinds of decline in different regions and domains from the fourth century into the sixth.

== Interpretative variations ==
There are various interpretations that characterise the events in a way that supports a particular thesis without taking issue with the basic chronology.

The historian Theodor Mommsen (Britain, 1885) said that "It was not Britain that gave up Rome, but Rome that gave up Britain ...", arguing that Roman needs and priorities lay elsewhere. His position has retained scholarly support over the passage of time.

Michael Jones (The End of Roman Britain, 1998) took the opposite view, claiming that it was Britain that left Rome, arguing that numerous usurpers based in Britain combined with poor administration caused the Romano-Britons to revolt. Certain scholars such as J. B. Bury ("The Notitia Dignitatum" 1920) and German historian Ralf Scharf, disagreed entirely with the standard chronology. They argued that the evidence in fact supports later Roman involvement in Britain, post 410.

== Factual disputes ==
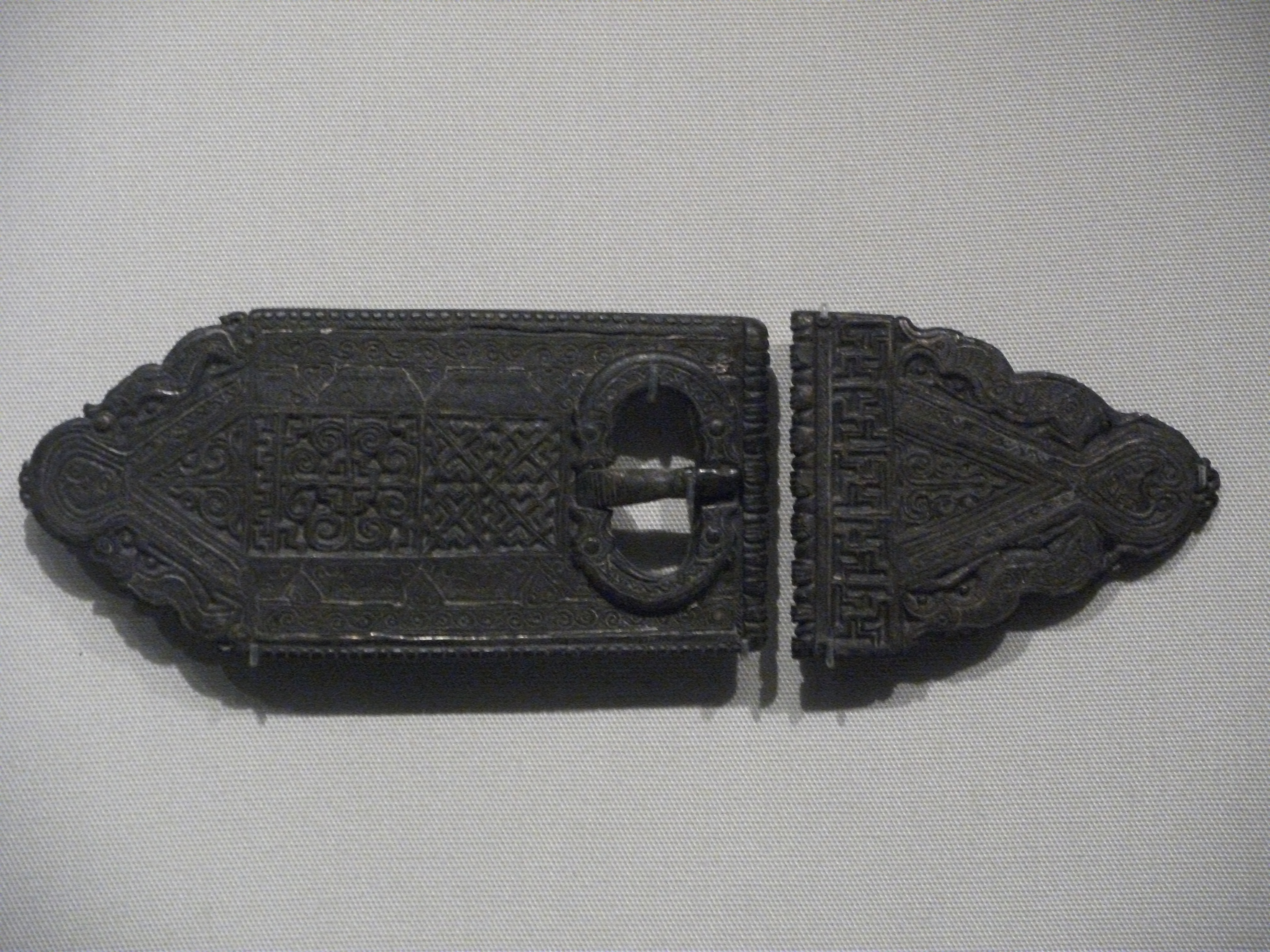
Romano-British or Anglo-Saxon belt fittings in the Quoit Brooch Style from the Mucking Anglo-Saxon cemetery in Essex, early 5th century, using a mainly Roman style for very early Anglo-Saxon clients

Regarding the events of 409 and 410 when the Romano-Britons expelled Roman officials and sent a request for aid to Honorius, Michael Jones (The End of Roman Britain, 1998) offered a different chronology to the same end result: he suggested that the Britons first appealed to Rome and when no help was forthcoming, they expelled the Roman officials and took charge of their own affairs.

Some historians suggest that the rescript of Honorius refers to the cities of the Bruttii (present-day Calabria), rather than to the cities of the Britons. The reference in Zosimus's history to the Britons is in a passage describing events in northern Italy, and Britannia may have been a copying error for Brettia. This reading of Zosimus has been criticized as arbitrary and speculative, and has its own inconsistencies. Bruttium was not in northern Italy either, and it would normally have a governor for Honorius to correspond with instead of city leaders. The theory also contradicts the account of Gildas, who provides independent support that the reference is to Britain by repeating the essence of Zosimus's account and clearly applying it to Britain.

E. A. Thompson ("Britain, A.D. 406–410") offered a more provocative theory to explain the expulsion of officials and appeal for Roman aid. He suggested that a revolt consisting of dissident peasants, not unlike the Bagaudae of Gaul, also existing in Britain, and when they revolted and expelled the Roman officials, the landowning class then made an appeal for Roman aid. There is no direct textual statement of this, though it might be plausible if the definition of 'bagaudae' is changed to fit the circumstances. There is no need to do so, as any number of rational scenarios already fit the circumstances. There is the possibility that some form of bagaudae existed in Britain, but were not necessarily relevant to the events of 409 and 410. The alleged ubiquity of Pelagianism amongst the British population may have contributed to such a movement if it had existed, not to mention large-scale purges amongst the British elite over previous decades. Among the works that mention but skirt the issue is Koch's Celtic Culture (2005), which cites Thompson's translation of Zosimus and goes on to say "The revolt in Britain may have involved bacaudae or peasant rebels as was the case in Armorica, but this is not certain."

== Bibliography ==
- Frere, Sheppard (1987), Britannia: A History of Roman Britain (3rd extensively revised ed.), London and New York: Routledge & Kegan Paul, ISBN 0-7102-1215-1 – via the Internet Archive
- Giles, John Allen, ed. (1841), "The Works of Gildas", The Works of Gildas and Nennius, London: James Bohn
- Higham, Nicholas (1992). Rome, Britain and the Anglo-Saxons. London: B. A. Seaby. ISBN 1-85264-022-7.
- Higham, Nicholas (2013). "Britain in and out of the Roman Empire". In Higham, Nicholas J.; Ryan, Martin J. (eds.). The Anglo-Saxon World. New Haven, Connecticut: Yale University Press. pp. 20–56. ISBN 978-0-300-12534-4.
- Jones, Barri; Mattingly, David (1990). An Atlas of Roman Britain. Cambridge: Blackwell Publishers (published 2007). ISBN 978-1-84217-067-0.
- Laing, Lloyd (1975). The Archaeology of Late Celtic Britain and Ireland, c. 400–1200 AD. Frome: Book Club Associates (published 1977).
- Mattingly, David (2006). An Imperial Possession: Britain in the Roman Empire. London: Penguin Books (published 2007). ISBN 978-0-14-014822-0.
- Snyder, Christopher A. (1998). An Age of Tyrants: Britain and the Britons A.D. 400–600. University Park: Pennsylvania State University Press. ISBN 0-271-01780-5.
- Snyder, Christopher A. (2003). The Britons. Malden: Blackwell Publishing. ISBN 978-0-631-22260-6.
