= The Little Emperors =

Novel by Alfred Duggan

- First edition (UK)
- Author: Alfred Duggan
- Language: English
- Publisher: Faber & Faber (UK); Coward-McCann (US)
- Publication date: 1951
- Publication place: United Kingdom
- Media type: Print (book)
- Pages: 264
- ISBN: 0-7538-1826-4

The Little Emperors is a 1951 historical novel by the English author Alfred Duggan. The novel follows the speculative exploits of Caius Felix in the Roman-British province of Britannia Prima.

== Plot synopsis ==
The story is set in Britain in 405–411 CE, telling of the decline of the Roman government in the diocese of Britannia.

Caius Sempronius Felix is a career Imperial civil servant. Born in the port city of Tingis in the Roman province of Mauritania Tingitana, he has served in many major Roman centres and has, by dint of loyalty and hard work (and not a little absconding with treasury funds), been appointed praeses (provincial governor) of Britannia Prima. Based in Londinium, and nominally responsible to the vicarius of the diocese, he is effectively the ruler – treasurer, administrator and magistrate with wide powers. He is married for political reasons to Maria, a younger woman and nominal Christian. His father-in-law Gratianus is a rich and scheming financier.

Felix tries hard to maintain what he sees as the high standards of Roman administration and etiquette that he has learned in centres in continental Europe closer to Rome. He is ruthless in punishing suspected criminals and seeing that taxes are paid on time; he does not hesitate to engage in various casual cruelties with his slaves, and his judicial decisions are often arbitrary. But all about him, the civilisation he single-mindedly supports is slowly breaking down. He tries hard to balance his limited budget, despite a moribund economy and constant demands for extra military spending. Rome still wins some military victories, but then the Germans invade Gaul and Britain is cut off.

With ever more depressing news of other provinces breaking away from the Empire, military defeats and the threat of Saxon pirate activity on the coast, Felix finds himself drawn into a military coup. Gratianus conspires to declare Britannia independent of the remaining Roman Empire and elevates one Marcus, an army officer from Eburacum, to become Emperor of Britannia.

Despite his military skills, the Sacred Marcus, as he has now become, proves to be only semi-literate and a crude character. He quickly invites Maria to become his mistress, planning to remove Felix. Gratianus and Maria have Marcus assassinated. Felix thinks Britannia will now revert to supporting the legitimate emperor Honorius; but instead Gratianus has himself proclaimed Emperor. Felix is left completely dependent on them and aware that if Gratianus is overthrown he (as the emperor's son-in-law) will be put to death by any successor regime.

Gratianus and Maria become suspicious that the military commander, Constantine (the historical usurper Constantine III), may wish to make himself emperor and found a dynasty with his son Constans. They decide to pre-empt this by assassinating Constans; Maria will invite him to dinner, kill him, and accuse him of trying to rape her. Felix is aware of the plot and travels to Verulamium to give himself an alibi. Here, he is confronted by Paulinus, his confidential clerk, a freedman and one of the few educated men in Londinium he can talk to as an intellectual equal. The clerk reveals himself as the chief of the agentes in rebus (Imperial secret service) sworn to be loyal to the reigning emperor. He reveals that Constantine and Constans suspected Gratianus and Maria and pre-empted the plot by having them killed; Constantine will now declare himself emperor. He is required to arrest and interrogate Felix, but during the interregnum, he is technically masterless and he sympathetically gives Felix the opportunity to flee.

Felix travels westwards through a country he has never seen and knows little about; only now does he realise how far the province has deteriorated. He has no survival skills and cannot communicate with the scattered peasants who speak only Celtic. But after many months, he meets a Celtic soldier who takes him to the court of his brother, the client-king of the province of Britannia Secunda. The king gives Felix sanctuary in return for writing a history of his family and himself for posterity. Felix eventually dies of grief and despair after hearing of the sack of Rome by Alaric. Meanwhile, Constantine and Constans have taken the remaining Roman troops from Britain to mount an unsuccessful attempt to seize control of the whole Western Empire. They are killed and their troops annihilated, and the Romano-British population are left to fend for themselves under client-kings such as the one served by Felix.

== See also ==
- Helena (Waugh novel)
