= Terentius (comes) =

5th-century Roman military commander

Terentius was maybe the 5th-century Roman general or military commander (Greek: Strategos) under Emperor Constantine III who accompanied Constans II, the son of the emperor, during the campaign against the cousins of Honorius in the Diocese of Hispania, which is present-day Spain. Historians consider him an obscure person, whose existence is uncertain.

== Sources ==
Terentius is known only from a single source, which is from the Greek historian Zosimus who mentions him in his historical account, Historia Nova, as an experienced commander along with Apollinarius, prefect of Constant's court, as companions.

== Bibliography ==
- Drinkwater, J.F.The Usurpers Constantine III (407-411) and Jovinus (411-413), in Britannia, Vol. 29 (1998), pp. 269-298
- Kulikowski, Michael (1998). The End of Roman Spain (PhD thesis). University of Toronto. ISBN 9780612339071.
