= Alfred Duggan =

Argentine-born English historian, novelist and archaeologist (1903–1964)

Alfred Duggan (born Alfredo León Duggan; 1903–1964) was an Argentine-born English historian and archaeologist, and a well-known historical novelist in the 1950s. His novels are known for meticulous historical research.

== Background ==
Though brought up in Britain, he was born Alfredo León Duggan in Lomas de Zamora, Buenos Aires, Argentina, to a family of wealthy landowners of Irish descent. His family moved to Britain when he was two years old. His father, Alfredo Huberto Duggan, a first generation Irish Argentine, was appointed in 1905 to the Argentine Legation in London, and died in 1915. In 1917, his mother, the Alabama-born Grace Elvira Hinds, daughter of the U.S. Consul General in Rio de Janeiro, became the second wife of Lord Curzon, the former Viceroy of India.

Duggan and his brother, Hubert (1904–1943), were brought up in Britain at Curzon's seats, and were educated first at Wixenford and Eton. Thereafter Alfred went to Balliol College at Oxford, where he became acquainted with Anthony Powell and Evelyn Waugh. He often features in Waugh's letters and diaries of the period, and his South American background may have influenced the character of Anthony Blanche in Brideshead Revisited, though Waugh described the character as "2/3 Brian [Howard] and 1/3 Harold Acton. People think it was all Harold, who is a much sweeter and saner man [than Howard]."

Alfred Duggan kept a car while at Oxford, one of the few students with sufficient funds and influence to do so; the University Statutes prohibited undergraduates from keeping a car within a certain distance of the town centre at Carfax, and so Duggan kept his, an early Rolls-Royce, just outside the limit of the jurisdiction of the University Proctors, and would regularly drive himself and his friends to and from London during the social season. At Oxford he was part of the Hypocrites' Club.

During 1938–1941, Duggan served with the London Irish Rifles, with active service in the Norwegian Campaign. For the rest of the Second World War he worked in an aeroplane factory.

In 1953, Duggan married Laura Hill. They went to live in Ross-on-Wye, where he died in April 1964. According to a review by John Derbyshire, Duggan "in later years, his inheritance gone... adjusted philosophically to his changed circumstances, living a bookish and domestic life utterly at odds with the extravagant dissipation of his youth. He seems to have been a devoted husband and parent, and a loyal friend."

== Literature ==
Duggan's novels are known for their basis of meticulous historical research. He also wrote popular histories of Ancient Rome and the Middle Ages. Knight with Armour, his first novel, appeared in 1946. He visited practically every place and battlefield described, since he was also an archaeologist, having worked on excavations in Istanbul during the 1930s.

Unlike many historical novelists, he does not idealise his subjects. A few characters are noble, some rather nasty, many mixed in their motives. Some of the novels can be seen as funny, in a dry noir style. A recurring theme is the slow moral corruption of a character who begins with an exalted opinion of himself as noble, wise and brave, but gradually compromises himself morally.

Most of the stories are told from the viewpoint of the ruling class – sometimes the ruler, sometimes a knight or noble. In English history, his novels show a general approval of the Norman conquest.

== Reception ==
Duggan's novel Three's Company (1958) was praised by Rex Warner, who stated, "Mr. Duggan has succeeded in making him (Lepidus) a modern character, but he has also firmly placed him in his own age. Three's Company is a most competent piece of work, scholarly, alive, and suggestive." In an introduction to Duggan's novel Count Bohemond (1964), Evelyn Waugh said Duggan's "literary style remained constant. It is as crisp and clear in this posthumous novel as in his first.... There is no groping in Alfred's work. At the age of forty-seven he published his first book. It was lucid and masterly, absolutely free of affectation or ostentation."

== Books ==
=== Novels ===
- Knight with Armour (1950). The First Crusade, as seen by a rather ordinary knight
- Conscience of the King (1951). A speculative life of Cerdic, founder of the kingdom of Wessex
- The Little Emperors (1951). A succession of coups in late Roman Britain
- The Lady for Ransom (1953). Norman mercenaries from the West serving the Byzantine Empire in the 11th century, featuring Roussel de Bailleul.
- Leopards and Lilies (1954). A noblewoman seeks her own advantage in the dangerous politics of England under King John and Henry III.
- God and My Right (1955). The life of St Thomas Becket
- Winter Quarters (1956). Two Gauls in the time of Julius Caesar join the Roman army and are captured at the Battle of Carrhae, to spend the rest of their lives as mercenaries for the Parthians in a faraway eastern province.
- Three's Company (1958). The career of Marcus Aemilius Lepidus, triumvir with Octavian and Marcus Antonius after the death of Julius Caesar
- Founding Fathers, U.S. title, Children of the Wolf (1959). Romulus and the founding of Rome
- The Cunning of the Dove (1960). The career of Edward the Confessor, told by one of his servants — it is implied that the servant was the main informant for the author of the Vita Edwardi.
- Family Favourites (1960). An ordinary Roman soldier witnesses the reign of Emperor Elagabalus
- The King of Athelney, U.S. title, The Right Line of Cerdic (1961). The life of Alfred the Great
- Lord Geoffrey's Fancy (1962). Life in one of the short-lived Crusader kingdoms in Greece, told by an ordinary knight, cousin to the eponymous Geoffrey of Briel
- Elephants and Castles, U.S. title, Besieger of Cities (1963). The life of Demetrius I of Macedon, one of the successors after the death of Alexander the Great; after being declared a god as a young man, everything else is an anticlimax.
- Count Bohemond (1964). With introduction by Evelyn Waugh, it is another account of the First Crusade, this time from the side of Bohemond of Antioch, one of its leaders.

=== Non fiction ===
- Thomas Becket of Canterbury (1952)
- Julius Caesar: A Great Life in Brief (1955)
- My Life for My Sheep: Thomas a Becket (1955)
- He Died Old: Mithradates Eupator, King of Pontus (1958)
- Devil's Brood: The Angevin Family (1957)
- Look at Castles (1960). For young readers
- The Castle Book (1961)
- Look At Churches (1961). Published in the United States as Arches and Spires (1962)
- Growing Up in Thirteenth Century England (1962)
- The Story of the Crusades 1097–1291 (1963)
- The Romans (1965). For young readers
- Growing up with the Norman Conquest (1965)
- The Falcon And the Dove: A Life of Thomas Becket of Canterbury (1971)
