= Maximus of Hispania =

Maximus
- Usurper of the Western Roman Empire
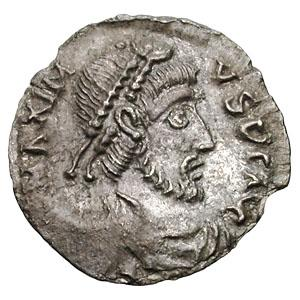
- Siliqua of Maximus
- Reign: 409 - 417 (in Hispania only, in competition with Constantine III and Honorius); ? 419-21 (may or may not be same figure)
- Predecessor: Constantine III
- Successor: Honorius
- Died: 422? Rome?
Regnal name
- Imperator Caesar Maximus Augustus
- Father: Gerontius?

Maximus (died c. 422) was a Roman usurper in Hispania (the Iberian Peninsula, modern Spain and Portugal). He was declared emperor in the Roman Civil war of 407–415 by the general Gerontius, who might have been his father.

== Sources ==
Hydatius mentions about Maximus that he was declared as a usurper by barbarians in Hispania. This is confirmed by Prosper. Orosius indirectly refers to him in his report over the chaotic situation in Hispania. A text passage in the Gallic chronicle mentions his death by his own followers.

== History ==
Gerontius had previously served the usurper Constantine III, who had sent him to Hispania. Relations between the two men deteriorated throughout the year 409, and when Constantine sent an army under his son and heir Constans in the late summer of 410, Gerontius mutinied and installed Maximus. Kullikowski suggests that Gerontius may have feared being replaced as Constantine's chief military figure in the provinces of Hispania. Drinkwater on the other hand suggests that Gerontius, seeing Constantine negotiating with Emperor Honorius over 409, had decided to side with the local Theodosian supporters. However, by the summer of 410 Gerontius had received no support from Italy, was threatened by Constans and desperate for imperial authority to confirm his arrangements with his barbarian allies. Faced by these threats, "Gerontius was at length driven into open revolt."

Maximus managed some degree of rule over the provinces of Hispania. Kullikowski reports that "the mint at Barcino struck coins in his name and there is evidence for major construction work on that city's walls during reign."

In the first 18 months of his reign Gerontius's forces defeated Constantine's forces, killed his son Constans at Vienna (modern Vienne, Isère) and trapped Constantine himself inside Arelas. Seeing the losses of the armies of the two usurpers, Honorius sent his general Constantius into Gaul; Gerontius' soldiers deserted him for the imperial general. Gerontius retired to Hispania, where he killed himself after his remaining troops turned on him.

Deprived of his major supporter, Maximus reportedly fled to sanctuary "amongst the barbarians in Hispania." Prosper of Tiro recorded that he was pardoned when he was removed from power.

The remainder of the recorded history of this shadowy figure becomes even more murky. He is commonly identified with a second Maximus who started his rebellion in Hispania between July 419 and February 421. According to Marcellinus Comes, this Maximus was brought to Rome where he was displayed and executed, along with one Jovinianus, around 23 January 422, during Honorius' tricennalia. Kullikowski supports this identification, explaining that he was defeated and captured by the comes Hispaniarum Asterius, for which achievement Asterius was rewarded with the Patriciate.
