= Roman civil war of 407–415 =

Failed revolts against Western Emperor Honorius

Roman Civil War 407–415
- Part of Fall of the Western Roman Empire
- initial phase
Date	407–415
Location	Spain, France, Britain, Africa
Result	Victory for Honorius' faction

Belligerents
Constantine III and Constans II; Gerontius and Maximus; Alaric I and Attalus; Jovinus; Heraclianus; Ataulf and Attalus	Honorius; Constantius III

The Roman Civil War (407–415) was a period of military conflict within the Western Roman Empire in the period 407 to 415, during which a series of usurpers rebelled against Emperor Honorius in Ravenna. The conflict began with the uprising of the Roman army in Britain (Roman province) under Constanine III (407–411), spread to the continent where the provinces of Gaul and Spain chose the side of the uprising. The conflict increased in magnitude when the Gothic rebel Alarik I interfered and pushed Attalus forward as counter-emperor (408–410 and 414), followed by the uprisings of Maximus (409–412), Jovinus (411–413), Heraclianus (412–413) and again Attalus this time with Athaulf (414–415). The civil war was eventually ended by the later emperor Constantius III by concluding a treaty with the new leader of the Gothic army Wallia.

== Background ==
The origin of this civil war may be based on two events. On the one hand, these are the treaties concluded under Emperor Theodosius I with barbarian groups allowing them to establish themselves within the empire as autonomous allies. This approach was a break with the past in which barbarian peoples were always completely defeated or expelled. Through these treaties, a policy was created in which Rome became dependent on non-Roman military elites. On the other hand, the division of the empire into an eastern and western part upon the death of the aforementioned emperor was very disadvantageous to the West when it was threatened in several areas and had to do without the assistance of Eastern troops. Stilicho, the western commander-in-chief, structurally had too few troops, especially when the eastern troops returned to the East after the battle of the Frigidus..

In 395, Emperor Theodosius left a weakened empire to his two sons, and because both were still minors, the two parts of the empire were increasingly governed by military rulers. In the West, the magister militum Stilicho, who ruled on behalf of the young emperor Honorius played a prominent role. The repeated uprisings of the Gothic leader Alaric I and his invasion of Italy (401–403) forced him to withdraw troops from the Rhine and Gallic border armies. The subsequent Radagaisus war in 405–406 led to a further concentration of military resources in Italy and depleted the empire's military reserves. In this context, the defense of the Rhine collapsed, after the massive invasion of Vandals, Sueben and Alanes across the Rhine border in 406. The chaos that arose in Gaul and the lack of an effective response from the central government led the Roman troops in Britain to revolt.

== Start ==
=== Revolt of Constantine III ===
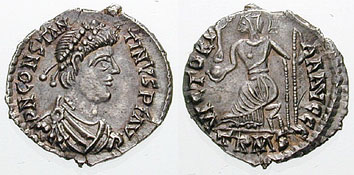
Siliqua by Constantine III, minted in Arles

The British army proclaimed emperor Constantine III crossed the Channel with his army in 407, which started the civil war in the Western Roman Empire. The goal of this counter-emperor was not only to seize power, but also to end the chaos that had arisen after the Rhine crossing of barbarian tribes. He managed to get a large part of Gaul under his control in a short time. He first stayed in Lyon, restored the Limes and sent an army south to conquer the seat of the Praetorian prefecture of Gaul. An unexpected attack by imperial troops led by Sarus on Constantine's armed forces at the end of 407 was repelled at Valentia, but had the result that Constantine had to leave the protection of the Rhine border to barbaric allies. Many local troops and administrators recognized him, probably because he was the only one who actually seemed to provide military protection. To consolidate his position, in 408 he proclaimed his son Constans II to Caesar and sent him, together with General Gerontius, to Spain to put down the uprising of Didymus and Verinianus, the cousins of Honorius. Constantine also achieved success there, so that his regime extended over Britannia, Gaul and parts of Spain.

=== Decline of Stilicho and counter-emperor Attalus ===
period 407–411

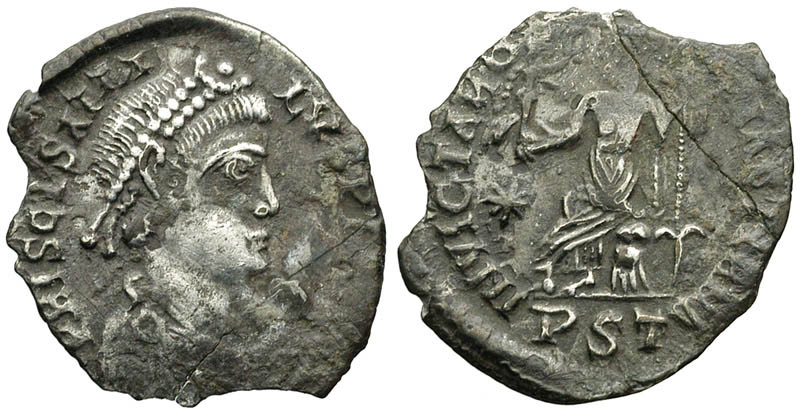
Siliqua by Priscus Attalus minted in Rome

The imperial court in Ravenna was hardly able to respond effectively in the early years. Honorius's government faced multiple crises at the same time. In addition to Constantine's uprising, the rebellious army under Alaric, which stayed in Noricum, formed a serious threat, while political intrigue also undermined the government.

Stilicho's plans, to use Alaric's army as an ally against Constantine met with resistance at court. On the advice of his advisors, the emperor refused to make financial resources available. As a result, tensions between Honorius and Stilicho continued to rise. Eventually, Stilicho was accused of self-emptive action, captured and executed in August 408.

After Stilicho's execution, the relationship between Alaric and the emperor deteriorated considerably. The situation became more acute when parts of the Roman army passed to Alaric, further weakening the emperor's position. Alaric increased the pressure by besieging Rome and forced the court to negotiate. When his demands were rejected, he crowned the city prefect of Rome, Priscus Attalus, emperor in December 409. Attalus appointed Alaric as his commander-in-chief, after which they tried to get the cities of northern Italy under control in the first half of 410. In the middle of that year, a conflict arose between the two over the strategy to be followed, especially when the comes Africae Heraclianus cut off the grain supply to Rome and threatened a famine. Alaric pushed Attalus aside and resumed negotiations with Honorius. When his troops were unexpectedly attacked by a Roman army, he decided to plunder Rome out of revenge.

Due to these developments in Italy, the emperor in Ravenna was temporarily unable to fight the usurper in Gaul militarily. In fact, it seems that Constantine was actually tolerated for some time, as long as he kept the provinces under control and did not advance directly against Italy. However, Constantine's position began to weaken when his own general Gerontius rebelled against him in 409. In Spain, Gerontius proclaimed a new emperor, Maximus. Constantine sent his son Constans to Spain with an army. Although this is not confirmed by contemporary sources, Constantine considered invading Italy himself in 410. Honorius was in an extremely questionable position by Alaric's army, especially after Attalus was proclaimed counter-emperor in Rome. According to Kulikowski, it is plausible that he entered Italy in the spring, but he did not get any further than the Po Valley and returned when he heard troubled reports.

=== Exaltation of Maximus in Hispania and the uprising of the Bagaudae ===
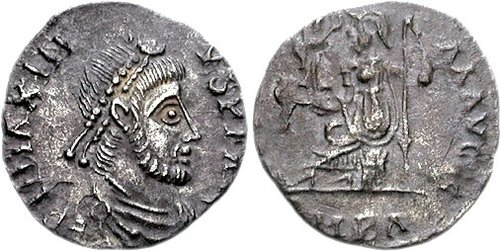
Siligua of Maximus of Hispania, minted in Barcino (Barcelona)

The army of Constans was defeated by Gerontius, after which the emperor's son had to flee to Arles. Due to this defeat, Constantine lost a significant part of his military support. Not long after, he himself was besieged in Arles by Gerontius. At the same time, his rule crumbled in the northwestern part of Gaul, where the local people (Bagaudae) came into uprising.

This internal crisis and the fact that Alaric and his army stayed in southern Italy finally offered the Ravenna court the opportunity to intervene. Constantine was again considered an opponent. The command of the imperial army now lay with General Constantius III. He entered Gaul, first defeating the troops of Gerontius and then taking over the siege of Arles. Constantine tried to get support from his Germanic allies on the Rhine, but this help came too late.

After a long siege, Constantine finally surrendered. Despite promises of security, he was captured and executed a short time later. With his death in 411, the most important usurper of the West disappeared, and the regime of Honorius was able to restore control for the time being. When General Constantius III won the siege of Arles in 411 and Constantine was captured, it seemed as if the regime of Honorius finally regained control of Gaul. In reality, the situation turned out to be much less stable. The long civil war had disrupted Gaul militarily and administratively. Cities had weakened, provincial administrators had been forced to adapt to changing rulers, and the Roman army in the region had been greatly thinned out. Constantius did not have enough troops to immediately regain control of the entire area.

=== Revolt of Jovinus and the intervention of Athaulf ===
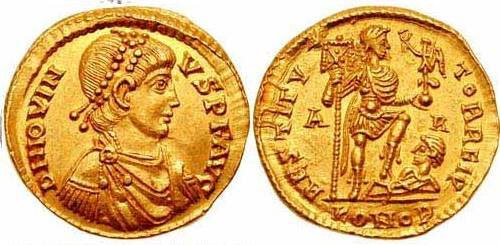
Siliqua of Jovinus minted in Trier

In northeastern Gaul, along the Rhine, a new power center could soon be created. Several military groups were still in this area: remnants of Roman border armies, but also Germanic allies and independently operating war gends. Under these circumstances, a new emperor was proclaimed in Mainz in 411: Jovinus. Jovinus was probably from the Gallic aristocracy. Unlike Constantine, he was not an officer proclaimed by soldiers in Britain, but rather a regional power figure who pushed himself forward in the political chaos. His position was also strongly based on the support of Germanic leaders along the Rhine. Among them were the Burgundian red Gundahar and the Alaan leader Goar, whose troops gave him the military strength needed to make his claim to the emperor's credibility.

The uprising of Jovinus shows how fundamentally the balance of power in Gaul had changed by now. Where Constantine had still largely built up his position with Roman armies from Britain and Gaul, Jovinus was heavily dependent on Germanic warriors. The initiative was therefore less and less with the traditional Roman army and more and more with regional military groups. For the court of Honorius, this meant that Constantius' victory over Constantine had not yet brought a definitive solution. While Italy was still recovering from the shock of Alaric's looting of Rome in 410, a new usurpation arose in Gaul. The civil war was not over yet.

Alaric died suddenly in 410 and the leadership passed to his brother-in-law Athaulf. He left Italy with his army and entered Gaul, looking for food, a stable residence and political recognition. His entourage also included the former emperor Attalus. In Gaul, Athaulf found the new regime of Jovinus, who had been proclaimed emperor along the Rhine shortly before with the support of Germanic allies. Initially, collaboration seemed possible. Jovinus could use the military power of the Goths well, while Athaulf could perhaps obtain a recognized position within the empire through the usurper. But the relationship deteriorated when Jovinus made his brother Sebastianus co-emperor without involving the Gothic leader.

Athaulf felt passed and changed course. He sought rapprochement with the court of Honorius and his general Constantius III. Then the Goths turned against Jovinus. Sebastian was defeated and killed, and Jovinus himself was also captured and extradited to Constantius, who had him executed.

=== Revolt of Heraclianus ===
Final phase (413–415)

Although this had ended the usurpation in Gaul, a new conflict was born with the arrival of a new counter-emperor in Africa, Heraclanus, the comes Africae. His rebellion can be partly explained by the rivalry with Constantius III, which went back to the period that led to the fall of Stilicho. After his execution, Constantius III grew into commander-in-chief of the army, while Heraclianus as comes Africae had control over Africa and thus over the crucial grain supply. Initially, both were on the side of van Honorius. Constantius restored the military order, while Heraclianus took care of supply and financial stability. However, when Constantius's position became stronger and he effectively became the dominant ruler, this balance of power was disrupted. Heraclianus, who did have economic power but did not have a strong field army, tried to convert his position into political power in 413 by rebelling. However, this attempt quickly failed. Without military superiority, he could not compete with the regime carried by Constantius.

=== Gothic stalemate and the shadow emperor ===
With the fall of Heraclianus, the civil war seemed to have come to an end, but shortly after, the cooperation between Athaulf and Constantius derailed and the final phase of the civil war began. The tensions stemmed from conflicting interests. Athaulf strove for formal recognition of his army and guarantees of land and food within the empire for the traveling Gothic people, while Constantius wanted to prevent the creation of a strong Gothic power base in Gaul. To exert pressure, Constatius blocked the grain supply. Athaulf, in turn, resorted to a proven remedy and in 414 he proclaimed Attalus again emperor. However, this move did not change the food problem of Athaulfs' army, while a decisive fight did not happen. The blockade of Constantius proved effective and supply problems forced the Goths to leave Gaul and move to Spain. During this period, Emperor Attalus, who had meanwhile lost his political significance, fell into Roman hands. He was taken to Rome and eventually banished.

== Sources and reflections ==
Ancient historians explained the crisis mainly that it was caused by moral, religious or personal failures. The most important contemporary or quasi contemporaine authors are: Orosius, Zosimus, Olympiodorus, Sozomenus and Socrates Scholasticus, whose interpretations differ greatly. Orosius wrote to prove that Christianity was not the cause of the disaster of Rome. He presents the events as part of God's plan, while the chaos remains temporary and manageable. Structural problems such as military deficits or fiscal weakness remain out of consideration in his work. Zosimus account a hundred years later is much more pessimistic. He attributes the decline to the abandonment of the traditional gods and to bad leadership. In doing so, he emphasizes hof intrigues and sees, among other things, the execution of Stilicho as an important cause. Olympiodorus, whose report is fragmentarily handed down, uses a more analytical and in a way “modern” approach. He gives details about diplomacy, describes mutual power relations and notes financial aspects. But his analysis does not go any deeper than that either.

According to modern historians, the civil war was the result of military weakness to maintain order, causing power to move from the center to the army leaders and regional power blocs. J.B. Bury pointed early on to the link between military weakening and the occurrence of usurpations. Heather builds on this by emphasizing the exhaustion of the Roman army and the impact of the arrival of the barbarian groups (War of Radagaisus and the Rhine Crossing). Guy Halsall nuances this vision. He puts more emphasis on regional elites and the fact that 'barbarians' were often part of the system.

The civil war of 407–415 makes it clear that the Western Roman Empire was structurally weakened. The armies were overloaded, scattered and increasingly dependent on barbaric allies. Usurpators such as Constantine III, Jovinus and Heraclianus were able to build regional control thanks to local troops and elites, while the central court in Ravenna could only exert limited influence. The success of Constantius III was based on a combination of military action and clever diplomacy. He played rivals against each other, won the support of Athaulf and eventually restored imperial authority in Gaul and Hispania. Yet the Western Roman Empire did not return to the situation before the civil war: in various parts of the empire, effective control was never fully restored. At the same time, the crisis illustrates how the growing dependence on regional and foederati armies undermined the traditional Roman army. This pattern would later make the emergence of generals, such as Aëtius to keep the empire together. The civil war thus emphasizes that the army was the core of Roman power, but also that this core had been severely weakened by external threats, internal uprisings and dependence on foederati.

== Sources ==
- Orosius, Historiae Adversum Paganos
- Zosimus, Historia Nova
- Olympiodorus, Fragments
- Sozomenus, Historia Ecclesiastica
- Socrates Scholasticus, Ekklesiastike Historia

== Bibliography ==
- Bury, J. B. (1889). A History of the Later Roman Empire of Arcadius to Irene. Vol. I. Macmillan.
- Drinkwater, J.F. (1998). "The Usurpers Constantine III (407–411) and Jovinus (411–413)". Britannia. 29: 269–298. JSTOR 526818.
- Heather, Peter (2006). The Fall of the Roman Empire: A New History of Rome and the Barbarians (2nd ed.). New York: Oxford University Press. ISBN 0-19-515954-3.
- Jones, Arnold Hugh Martin; Martindale, John Robert; Morris, John (1964). The Prosopography of the Later Roman Empire, Part 2. Cambridge University Press. ISBN 0-521-20159-4
- Kulikowski, Michael (1998). The End of Roman Spain (PhD thesis). University of Toronto. ISBN 9780612339071.
- Kulikowski, Michael (2000). "Barbarians in Gaul, Usurpers in Britain". Britannia. 31. Society for the Promotion of Roman Studies: 325–345 JSTOR 526925. doi:10.2307/526925. JSTOR 526925. S2CID 162663612.
- Kulikowski, Michael (2006). Rome's Gothic Wars: From the Third Century to Alaric (Thesis). Cambridge and New York: Cambridge University Press. ISBN 978-0-521-84633-2.
- Wijnendaele, Jeroen W.P. (2019). Sarus the Goth: from imperialcommander to warlord in: Early Medieval Europe. John Wiley & Sons Ltd. pag. 469-493
