= Olympiodorus =

Olympiodoros or Olympiodorus (Greek: Ὀλυμπιόδωρος) can refer to:

- Olympiodoros (military leader), son of Lampon, Athenian military commander at the Battle of Plataea in 479 BC
- Olympiodorus of Athens, eponymous archon of Athens in 294/3 and 293/2 BC
- Olympiodorus the Seleucid (c. 178 BC), 2nd-century BC high-priest in Coele-Syria and Phoinike, commissioned by Seleucus IV Philopator
- Olympiodorus of Thebes (fl. 412), 5th-century historical writer
- Olympiodorus the Elder, 5th-century Neoplatonist philosopher and teacher of Proclus
- Olympiodorus the Younger (c. 495 – 570), 6th-century Neoplatonist philosopher, last pagan head of Alexandrian School, and astrologer
- Olympiodorus the Deacon, 6th-century Alexandrian writer of Bible commentaries
