= Christopher Snyder (historian) =

American historian

Christopher Allen Snyder is the Dean of Shackouls Honors College at Mississippi State University, in Starkville, Mississippi. He was previously a professor of European history and director of the Honors Program at Marymount University, in Arlington, Virginia.

Snyder received his Ph.D. in medieval history in 1994 from Emory University in Atlanta, Georgia. He entered the world of Tolkien research with his 2013 book The Making of Middle-earth.

== Publications ==
- An Age of Tyrants: Britain and the Britons, A.D. 400–600, Pennsylvania State University Press 1998, ISBN 0-271-01780-5.
- The World of King Arthur, Thames & Hudson 2000, ISBN 0-500-05104-6.
- The Britons (The Peoples of Europe), Wiley-Blackwell 2003, ISBN 0-631-22260-X.
- Early Peoples of Britain and Ireland: An Encyclopedia [2 volumes], Greenwood 2008, ISBN 1-84645-009-8.
- The Making of Middle Earth: A New Look Inside the World of J.R.R. Tolkien, Sterling New York 2013, ISBN 978-1-4027-8476-7
- Hobbit Virtues, 2020

== Reception ==
David Bratman, reviewing The Making of Middle-earth for Tolkien Studies journal, calls Snyder "that rare thing, a medievalist writing on Tolkien who did not become a medievalist through being a Tolkien fan first." Bratman describes the book as for a general audience, to some extent conflating Peter Jackson's Lord of the Rings films (about which Bratman says Snyder is enthusiastic) with Tolkien's book. He finds Snyder "most in his element" in the chapter on "Tolkien's Middle Ages" where he introduces everything from classical civilisation to the pre-Raphaelites and the early fantasy author George MacDonald.

David W. Marshall, reviewing the book for Arthuriana, writes that it stands out on the well-trodden road as it explores all aspects from languages and Tolkien's sources to his artwork and life. Marshall calls it "a lovely book, with early maps, manuscript illuminations, illustrations, and photos adorning pages that are printed to resemble vellum", and call-out boxes highlighting aspects such as the Sindarin language or the development of Gollum's character.

Kate DiGirolamo, reviewing the book for Library Journal, notes that even fantasy fiction "has its roots in reality", and finds Snyder an "expert guide" through the historical context and literary influences on Tolkien's Middle-earth, though she finds the account of Tolkien's own life "sparse". In her view, Snyder "brilliantly interweaves Tolkien's academic papers, letters, and reviews of his books, along with gorgeous illustrations and supplementary images" to give readers a view of how Middle-earth derives from real history.
