= Marcus (usurper) =

Roman usurper who was proclaimed emperor in 406 in Roman Britain

- Usurper of the Western Roman Empire
- Reign: c. July 406 AD – c. October 406 AD
- Predecessor: Honorius
- Successor: Gratian
- Born: c. 4th century AD
- Died: c. October 406 AD; Britannia
Names
- Marcus
Regnal name
- Imperator Caesar Marcus Augustus

Marcus (d. 406 AD) was a Roman usurper who was proclaimed Emperor of Roman Britain. He was killed later that same year in a subsequent mutiny.

== Career ==
Marcus was a high-ranking soldier in Roman Britain who was proclaimed emperor by the local army sometime in 406, possibly during the summer. Possibly one of the army commanders in Britain (Comes Britanniarum, Comes Litoris Saxonici or Dux Britanniarum), he may have risen to power in response to increasing raids from abroad at a time when the Empire was withdrawing troops from its far-flung provinces, such as Britain, to protect its heartland.

While the historian J. B. Bury has suggested that the revolt of the British legions in 406 was primarily directed against Stilicho, the magister militum of the Emperor Honorius, the ancient sources (Olympiodorus of Thebes, Zosimus and Orosius) generally link the revolt to the barbarian incursions into Gaul and Italy, especially the Vandal and Alanic tribes crossing the Rhine, which Prosper of Aquitaine dated to 31 December 406. Modern historians have therefore debated whether this event was the trigger for the rebellion. Historians such as N. H. Baynes and M. Kulikowski argue that the rebellion was triggered by the crossing of the Rhine, which should therefore be dated to 31 December 405. Others, however, such as F. Paschoud and Anthony Birley, argue that Prosper's date is correct and that the events in Gaul which triggered the rebellion were related to the barbarians who entered Gaul from Italy, probably part of the army of Radagaisus which invaded Italy in 405/6.

Whatever the cause of the rebellion, all that is known of Marcus' brief reign is that he did not please the army and was soon killed by them and replaced by another short-lived usurper, Gratian. Marcus died around October 406. Gratian, in turn, was killed by the troops in early 407 and replaced by Constantine III.

In his pseudo-historical work, the Historia Regum Britanniae, Geoffrey of Monmouth tells of a Gracianus Municeps who took the throne of Britain from King Dionotus; it is possible that he based these characters on the historical Gratian and Marcus.

He is one of three would-be emperors described in Alfred Duggan's historical novel The Little Emperors.

== Sources ==
=== Primary sources ===
- Zosimus, "Historia Nova", Book 6 Historia Nova

=== Secondary sources ===
- Birley, Anthony R., The Roman Government of Britain, Oxford University Press, 2005, ISBN 0-19-925237-8
- Martindale, John R., ed. (1980). The Prosopography of the Later Roman Empire: Volume II, AD 395–527. Cambridge: Cambridge University Press. ISBN 0-521-20159-4.
- Bury, J. B., A History of the Later Roman Empire from Arcadius to Irene, Vol. I (1889)
