= Gerontius =

Gerontius (/dʒɪˈrɒntiəs, ɡɪˈrɒntiəs/; Latinized Greek for 'old man') can refer to:

== Music and literature ==
- The Dream of Gerontius, a 1900 choral work by Edward Elgar, a setting of a poem of the same name by John Henry Newman
- The Dream of Gerontius, the poem by John Henry Newman

== People ==
- Gerontius (bishop of Milan), bishop of Milan (462-465)
- Gerontius of Cervia, 6th-century Italian bishop
- Gerontius, Metropolitan of Moscow, 1473-1489
- Gerontius (magister militum), early 5th-century Roman general
- Gerontius (commander), early 4th-century Roman commander of Tomis

== Fiction ==
- Gerontius, a 1989 novel by James Hamilton-Paterson
- Gerontius, the given name of the Old Took, a hobbit mentioned in J. R. R. Tolkien's fantasy series The Lord of the Rings

== See also ==
- Geraint (given name) (the Welsh form of Gerontius)
