= Gratian (usurper) =

Roman usurper who was proclaimed emperor in 406 in Roman Britain

- Usurper of the Western Roman Empire
- Reign: c. October 406 – c. February 407
- Predecessor: Marcus
- Successor: Constantine III
- Died: February 407; Britannia
Names
- Gratianus
Regnal name
- Imperator Caesar Gratianus Augustus

Gratian or Gratianus (died c. February 407) was a Roman usurper in Roman Britain from 406 to 407.

== Career ==
After the murder of the usurper Marcus, Gratian was proclaimed emperor by the army in Britain in late 406, probably around October. His background, as recorded by Orosius, was that of a Romano-Briton and member of the urban aristocracy, possibly a curialis. The promotion of a non-military official by the army suggests that there were issues that the army felt would be better handled by a civilian official, such as pay, or perhaps disagreements between the Comes Britanniarum, the Comes Litoris Saxonici and the Dux Britanniarum. (Note: Anthony Birley disagreed with the assumption that Gratian held a civilian position, arguing that Orosius only meant that he was a native of Britain, and that Gratian was therefore still one of the higher officers of the British army, either a Comes or a Dux.)

Gratian's usurpation coincided with a major barbarian invasion of Gaul; on the last day of December 406 (or, perhaps, 405), an army of Vandals, Alans and Suebi (Sueves) had crossed the frozen Rhine. During 407 they spread across northern Gaul towards Boulogne, and Zosimus wrote that troops in Britain feared an invasion across the English Channel.

The historian J. B. Bury speculated that it was Stilicho, the magister militum of Emperor Honorius, who instigated the barbarian invasion of Gaul, concerned about the British usurpers but unable to act against them because of the activities of Radagaisus and Alaric I.The invasion was therefore meant to distract the British army. This hypothesis has been rejected by modern historians such as Thomas Burns, who argues that Stilicho was dependent on the Gallic army to deal with the rebellion. It was only the heavy losses suffered by the Gallic field armies as a result of the Vandal invasion that forced Stilicho to reconsider his response to the British rebellion.

As news of the barbarian invasion reached Britain, and their rapid approach to Boulogne (the main port from which supplies and troops would arrive in Britain), the army became restless. It is speculated that the army wanted to cross into Gaul and stop the barbarians, but Gratian ordered them to stay. Unhappy with this, the troops killed him after four months of rule and elected Constantine III as their leader in early February.

Geoffrey of Monmouth describes a similar figure, Gracianus Municeps, who is probably the same person.

He is one of three would-be emperors described in Alfred Duggan's historical novel The Little Emperors.

== Sources ==
=== Primary sources ===
- Zosimus, "Historia Nova", Book 6 Historia Nova
- Orosius, Historiae adversum Paganos, 7.40

=== Secondary sources ===
- Birley, Anthony R., The Roman Government of Britain, Oxford University Press, 2005, ISBN 0-19-925237-8
- Burns, Thomas Samuel, Barbarians Within the Gates of Rome: A Study of Roman Military Policy and the Barbarians, Ca. 375-425 A.D., Indiana University Press, 1994, ISBN 0-25-331288-4
- Martindale, John R., ed. (1980). The Prosopography of the Later Roman Empire: Volume II, AD 395–527. Cambridge: Cambridge University Press. ISBN 0-521-20159-4.
- Bury, J. B., A History of the Later Roman Empire from Arcadius to Irene, Vol. I (1889)
