= Didymus and Verinianus =

Provincial division of Diocese of Hispania from 293

Didymus and Verenianus were two brothers, members of the Hispano-Roman elite and relatives of Emperor Honorius. Olympiodorus calls them his cousins. According to Paulus Orosius they belonged to the nobiles ac divites (notable and very rich) — an aristocratic upper layer that based its wealth and influence on extensive land ownership in Hispania.

== Imperal family ==
The brothers were closely linked by birth to the Theodosian dynasty, whose founder Flavius Theodosius (330–376) also came from Hispania. In addition to Honorius, his brother Arcadius, emperor of the eastern part of the empire and Serena, the wife of Flavius Stilicho, commander-in-chief of the Roman army, are also part of this. Furthermore, Didymus and Verentianus had two younger brothers, Theodosiolus and Lagodius.

== History ==
At the beginning of the 5th century, in the wake of the Rhine crossing of 406, the West of the Roman Empire came under heavy pressure as a result of a Roman civil war of 407–415. In this context, Didymus and Verinian' supported the legitimate emperor Honorius against the usurper Constantine III, who extended his power from Gaul to Hispania. It is unclear whether Didymus and Verinianus were in direct contact with the imperial court, clear evidence of this is missing. Nevertheless, their action was logical when the family relationship is included, because Stilicho -who led the operations of the army- had great importance in their participation.

Initially, however, Didymus and Verinian were divided by mutual tensions or rivalry — presumably over power, influence, or possession. According to tradition, they adjusted their conflict when the political situation changed This reconciliation enabled them to act together to defend their interests and those of the imperial authority in Hispania. After their reunification, Didymus and Verenian mobilised armed forces, largely composed by slaves and farmers recruited from their estates and organised the resistance possibly from Emerita Augusta against the supporters of Constantine III. This underscores their position as large landowners with considerable local power: they could independently deploy military resources at a time when central authority was weakening.

However, their success was short-lived, as the uprising was eventually repelled by the troops of Constantine III, led by his general Gerontius. Didymus and Verinianus were captured with their wives and taken to Arles where Constantine stayed. There they were eventually executed, which failed their attempt to maintain Theodosian loyalty in Hispania.

== Their execution ==
Orosius calls their death was tragic and unjust, because it took place at a time when Honourius (under pressure from a.o. Alarik I) Constantine temporarily recognised as co-emperor. Their execution therefore raises questions among historians that can best be understood from Constantijns' point of view. In his eyes, the brothers were more than just relatives of the emperor. For him, they were a threat to his power over Hispania, because Didymus and Verinianus had their own armed forces and represented the power of the Hispano-Roman nobility. When he got the chance, he let them get out of the way.

== See also ==
- Roman civil war of 407–415

== Sources ==
- Orosius, Historiae adversus paganos
- Zosimus, Historia Nova
- Olympiodorus, Fragments
- Sozomenus, Historia Ecclesiastica

== Bibliography ==
- Drinkwater, J.F. (1998). "The Usurpers Constantine III (407-411) and Jovinus (411-413)". Britannia. Vol. 29. pp. 269–298.
- Kulikowski, Michael (1998). The end of Roman Spain (PhD thesis). University of Toronto.
- Jones, A.H.M.; Martindale, J. R.; Morris, J (1971). The Prosopography of the Later Roman Empire. Cambridge University Press.
