= List of Roman civil wars and revolts =

Civil conflicts within ancient Rome

This list of Roman civil wars and revolts includes civil wars and organized civil disorder, revolts, and rebellions in ancient Rome (Roman Kingdom, Roman Republic, and Roman Empire) until the fall of the Western Roman Empire (753 BC – AD 476). For the Eastern Roman Empire or Byzantine Empire after the division of the Empire in West and East, see List of Byzantine revolts and civil wars (AD 330–1453). For external conflicts, see List of Roman external wars and battles. Not all uses of Senatus consultum ultimum are listed.

From the establishment of the Roman Republic in 509 BC until the 1st century BC, there were a sparse number of civil wars. But with the Crisis of the Roman Republic (134–44 BC), a period of considerable political instability began. The cause of the late Roman Republican civil wars is contested, as is whether the wars were the cause of, or caused by, the end of the Roman Republic. Regardless, a nearly constant stream of civil wars marked the end of the Roman Republic and heralded the rise of the Roman Empire in 27 BC. The first century of Empire was marked by widespread revolt through territory Rome had captured in the preceding centuries. The second century AD was relatively peaceful, with a limited number of revolts. Political instability returned to the Empire with the Crisis of the Third Century (235–284 AD), which saw at least 26 civil wars in just 50 years as usurpers sought the imperial throne. The fourth and fifth centuries AD were characterized by a regular rising of usurpers. The overthrow of the last Western Roman emperor in AD 476 by the Germanic king Odoacer marked the final civil war or revolt, as well as the end of the Western Roman Empire.

Because the study of Roman civil war has been deeply influenced by historic Roman views on civil war, not all entries on this list may be considered civil wars by modern historians. Implicit in most Roman power struggles was a propaganda battle, which impacted how the struggle would be chronicled and referred to. For example, historians Lange & Vervaet suggest that the crisis after Caesar's assassination might be better understood as an internal emergency. Conversely, some revolts on this list may be properly considered to be civil wars, but were not referred to as such by Roman chroniclers. As Lange & Vervaet note, "civil war often refuses to speak its name."

== 6th century BC ==
- 509 BC Overthrow of the Roman monarchy
- 509 BC Tarquinian conspiracy

== 5th century BC ==
- 500 BC–287/286 BC Conflict of the Orders – political struggle between the plebeians and patricians of the Roman Republic

== 3rd century BC ==
- 269 BC: Revolt of the Samnites guided by Lollius - revolt suppressed
- 269-268 BC: Picenti revolt - revolt suppressed and their land is conquered
- 265-264 BC: Revolt of the Etruscan city Volsinii: revolt suppressed with city being destroyed
- 241 BC: Falisci revolt – revolt suppressed and their city destroyed
- 216–203 BC: Defection of Rome's Italic allies to the Carthaginians during the Second Punic War

== 2nd century BC ==
- 135–132 BC: First Servile War in Sicily - slave revolt suppressed
- 125 BC: Fregellae's revolt - revolt suppressed
- 104–100 BC: Second Servile War in Sicily - slave revolt suppressed

== 1st century BC ==
- 91–87 BC: Social War, between Rome and many of its Italian allies – Roman victory.
  - 89 BC – Battle of Fucine Lake – Roman forces under Lucius Porcius Cato are defeated by the Italian rebels.
  - 89 BC – Battle of Asculum – Roman army under Gnaeus Pompeius Strabo decisively defeat the rebels.
- 88 BC: Sulla's first march on Rome, causing his enemy, Gaius Marius, to be outlawed.
- Bellum Octavianum (87 BC), civil war between the consuls Cornelius Cinna and Gnaeus Octavius – Cinnan victory.
- Sulla's civil war (83–81 BC), fought between Sulla and Cinna's supporters – Sullan victory. Some regard the entire 88–82 BC period as one of Roman civil war.
  - 82 BC –
    - Battle of the Asio River – Quintus Caecilius Metellus Pius defeats a Popular army under Gaius Carrinas.
    - Battle of Sacriporto – Fought between the Optimates under Lucius Cornelius Sulla Felix and the Populares under Gaius Marius the Younger, Optimate victory.
    - First Battle of Clusium – Fought between the Optimates under Sulla and the Populares under Gnaeus Papirius Carbo, Popular victory.
    - Battle of Faventia – Fought between the Optimates under Metellus and the Populares under Gaius Norbanus Balbus, Optimate victory.
    - Battle of Fidentia – Fought between the Optimates under Marcus Terentius Varro Lucullus and the Populares under Lucius Quincius, Optimate victory.
    - Second Battle of Clusium – Pompey defeats a numerically superior Populares army under Gaius Carrinas and Gaius Marcius Censorinus.
    - Battle of Colline Gate – Sulla defeats the Samnites allied to the popular party in Rome in the decisive battle of the Civil War.
- Sertorian War (80–72 BC) between Rome and the provinces of Hispania under the leadership of Quintus Sertorius, a former supporter of Marius and Cinna – Sullan victory.
  - 80 BC – Battle of the Baetis River – Rebel forces under Sertorius defeat the legal Roman forces of Lucius Fufidius in Hispania.
  - 79 BC – Battle at the Anas River – Sertorius' legate Lucius Hirtuleius defeats the Sullan Governor Marcus Domitius Calvinus, who dies in the altercation.
  - 76 BC – Battle of Lauron – Sertorius defeats Pompey outside the walls of the city of Lauron, which he then razes to the ground.
  - 75 BC –
    - Battle of Valentia – Pompey defeats Sertorius' subordinates Marcus Perperna Veiento and Gaius Herennius near Valencia.
    - Battle of Italica – Metellus defeats Hirtuleius near the Roman colony of Italica.
    - Battle of Sucro – Sertorius and Pompey clash near the banks of the Sucro River. Both armies lose a wing, and the battle ends in a draw.
    - Battle of Saguntum – Sertorius, Perperna and Hirtuleius battle with Metellus and Pompey. The battle ends in a draw, with heavy losses on both sides: Gaius Memmius and Hirtuleius die.
    - Siege of Clunia – Sertorius lay sieged in Clunia with Metellus and Pompey outside. He eventually extricates himself, rejoins with his army, and resumes the war.
  - 74 BC – Siege of Calgurris – Sertorius defeats a besieging Roman army at the fortress town of Calgurris.
  - 73/72 BC – Battle of Osca – Perperna leads the Sertorians in battle against Pompey after assassinating Sertorius, near Osca. Pompey defeats him, ending the Sertorian War.
- 77 BC: Lepidus' rebellion against the Sullan regime – Sullan victory.
- Third Servile War in Italy (73–71 BC) – slave revolt suppressed.
  - 73 BC – Battle of Mount Vesuvius – Spartacus defeats Gaius Claudius Glaber.
  - 72 BC – Battle of Picenum – Slave Revolt led by Spartacus defeated by a Roman army led by Lucius Gellius and Gnaeus Cornelius Lentulus Clodianus.
  - 72 BC – Battle of Mutina I – Slave Revolt led by Spartacus defeats another army of Romans.
  - 71 BC –
    - Battle of Cantenna – Roman forces defeated a detachment of Spartacus' army led by gladiators Gannicus and Castus
    - Battle of Campania – Slave Revolt led by Spartacus defeat a Roman army.
    - Battle of Campania II – a Roman army under Marcus Licinius Crassus defeats Spartacus's army of slaves.
    - Battle of the Siler River – Crassus decisively defeats the army of Spartacus.
- Catilinarian conspiracy (63–62 BC) – failed coup d'état by the dissatisfied followers of Catiline against the Roman Senate – Senatorial victory.
  - 62 BC, January – Battle of Pistoria – The forces of the conspirator Catiline are defeated by the loyal Roman armies under Gaius Antonius.
- 54–53 BC: Ambiorix's revolt, part of the larger Gallic Wars.
- Caesar's civil war (49–45 BC) between Julius Caesar and the Roman Senate, initially led by Pompey – Caesarian victory.
  - 49 BC, February – Siege of Corfinium – The siege lasted only a week, the defenders surrendered themselves to Caesar.
  - 49 BC, 9 March – 18 March – Siege of Brundisium – Caesar tries to blockade the harbour, Pompey abandons the city.
  - 49 BC, June – Battle of Ilerda – Caesar's army surrounds Pompeian forces, causing them to surrender.
  - 49 BC, 24 August – Battle of the Bagradas River – Caesar's general Gaius Scribonius Curio is defeated in North Africa by the Pompeians under Attius Varus and King Juba I of Numidia. Curio is killed in battle.
  - 48 BC, 10 July – Battle of Dyrrhachium – Caesar barely avoids a catastrophic defeat by Pompey in Macedonia.
  - 48 BC, 29 July – Siege of Gomphi – Gomphi falls in a few hours and Caesar's men are allowed to sack it.
  - 48 BC, 9 August – Battle of Pharsalus – Caesar decisively defeats Pompey, who flees to Egypt.
  - 47 BC, February – Battle of the Nile – Caesar defeats the forces of the Egyptian king Ptolemy XIII.
  - 46 BC, 4 January – Battle of Ruspina – Caesar loses perhaps as much as a third of his army to Titus Labienus.
  - 46 BC, 6 February – Battle of Thapsus – Caesar defeats the Pompeian army of Quintus Caecilius Metellus Pius Scipio in North Africa.
  - 45 BC, 17 March – Battle of Munda – Caesar defeats the Pompeian forces of Labienus, Gnaeus Pompeius Magnus (son of Pompey) and Sextus Pompey in Hispania. Labienus is killed in the battle, and Gnaeus is captured and executed.
- 46 BC: Revolt of the Bellovaci in North-Eastern Gaul – revolt suppressed.
- 44 BC: Revolt of the Allobroges in Gaul – revolt suppressed.
- War of Mutina (December 44 – April 43 BC) between the Senate's army (led first by Cicero and then by Octavian) and the army of Mark Antony, Lepidus, and their colleagues – Truce results in union of forces.
  - 43 BC, 14 April – Battle of Forum Gallorum – Antony, besieging Caesar's assassin Decimus Junius Brutus Albinus in Mutina, defeats the forces of the consul Pansa, who is killed, but is then immediately defeated by the army of the other consul, Hirtius.
  - 43 BC, 21 April: Battle of Mutina – Senatorial victory over Antony.
- Liberators' civil war (44–42 BC) between the Second Triumvirate and the Liberators (Brutus and Cassius, Caesar's assassins) – Triumvirate victory.
  - 43 BC, 21 April – Battle of Mutina – Antony is again defeated in battle by Hirtius, who is killed. Although Antony fails to capture Mutina, Decimus Brutus is murdered shortly thereafter.
  - 42 BC, 3 October – First Battle of Philippi – Triumvirs Antony and Octavian fight an indecisive battle with Caesar's assassins Brutus and Cassius. Although Brutus defeats Octavian, Antony defeats Cassius, who commits suicide.
  - 42 BC, 23 October – Second Battle of Philippi – Brutus's army is decisively defeated by Antony and Octavian. Brutus escapes, but commits suicide soon after.
- Bellum Siculum (42–36 BC), war between the Second Triumvirate (particularly Octavian and Marcus Vipsanius Agrippa) and Sextus Pompey, the son of Pompey – Triumvirate victory.
  - 36 BC – Battle of Mylae – Agrippa defeats the Pompeian fleet led by Papias.
  - 36 BC – Battle of Naulochus – Octavian's fleet, under the command of Agrippa defeats Sextus' forces.
- Perusine War (41–40 BC) between the forces of Octavian against Lucius Antonius and Fulvia (the younger brother and wife of Mark Antony respectively) – Octavian victory.
  - 41 BC – Battle of Perugia – Mark Antony's brother Lucius Antonius and his wife Fulvia are defeated by Octavian.
- 38 BC: Revolt of Gallia Aquitanian tribes – revolt suppressed by Agrippa.
- War of Actium (32–30 BC): between Octavian and his friend and general Agrippa against Antony and Cleopatra – Octavian victory.
  - 31 BC, 2 September – Battle of Actium – Octavian decisively defeats Antony and Cleopatra in a naval battle near Greece.
- 30–29 BC: Revolt of the Morini and Treveri in Northern Gaul with Germanic support – revolt suppressed.
- 30 BC: Revolt of Thebes, erupted in the Nile delta and the Thebes – revolt suppressed by Gaius Cornelius Gallus.
- 28–27 BC: Revolt in Aquitania – revolt suppressed by Marcus Valerius Messalla Corvinus.
- 13 BC: Revolt of Vologases, priest of Dionysus, in Thrace – revolt suppressed.
- 11–9 BC: Revolt of southern mountain tribes in Thrace – revolt suppressed by Calpurnius Piso.
- 4 BC: Revolt of Jews in Judea – revolt suppressed by Publius Quinctilius Varus.

== 1st century ==
- 3–6: Revolt of the Gaetuli in Mauretania – revolt suppressed by Cossus Cornelius Lentulus Gaetulicus
- 6: Revolt of Judas of Galilee against Roman taxation – revolt suppressed
- Bellum Batonianum (6–9) – An alliance of tribes numbering more than 200,000 people in Illyricum rose in rebellion against Rome, but were suppressed by Roman legions led by Tiberius and Germanicus.
- 9: Battle of the Teutoburg Forest – Cherusci-born Roman commander Arminius defected to a coalition Germanic rebel groups, who jointly ambushed and annihilated three Roman legions under Publius Quinctilius Varus, prompting retaliation campaigns by the Romans. The revolt was eventually successful, and the Roman Empire abandoned all its holdings northeast of the Rhine. See also Roman campaigns in Germania (12 BC – AD 16).
- 14: Mutiny of the legions in Germania and Illyricum suppressed by Germanicus and Drusus Julius Caesar
- 17–24: Tacfarinas' revolt in north Africa – revolt suppressed by Publius Cornelius Dolabella
- 21: Revolt of Sacrovir – revolt of the Treveri, Aedui, Andes (Andecavi) and Turoni under Julius Florus and Julius Sacrovir in Gaul – revolt suppressed by Gaius Silius and Gaius Calpurnius Aviola
- 21: Revolt of the Coelaletae, Odrysae and Dii in Thrace – revolt suppressed by P. Vellaeus
- 26: Revolt in Thrace – revolt suppressed by Gaius Poppaeus Sabinus
- 28: Battle of Baduhenna Wood: revolt of the Frisii – pyrrhic Roman victory
- 36: Revolt of the Cietae in Cappadocia – revolt suppressed by Marcus Trebellius
- 38: Alexandrian riots
- 40: Alexandrian riots
- 40–44: Revolt of Aedemon and Sabalus in Mauretania – revolt suppressed by Gaius Suetonius Paulinus and Gnaeus Hosidius Geta
- 42: Failed usurpation of Lucius Arruntius Camillus Scribonianus in Dalmatia
- 46: Riots in the Kingdom of Thrace against the Romans after the death of King Rhoemetalces III – revolt suppressed
- 46–48: Jacob and Simon uprising in the Galilee – revolt suppressed
- 60–61: Boudican revolt by Iceni, Trinovantes and other Celtic tribes in Britannia commanded by queen Boudica – revolt suppressed by Gaius Suetonius Paulinus
  - 60 – Battle of Camulodunum – Boudica began her uprising against the Romans by capturing and then sacking Camulodunum, then moved on Londinium.
  - 61 – Battle of Watling Street – Boudica was defeated by Suetonius Paullinus
- First Jewish–Roman War (66–73) – revolt suppressed
  - 66 – Battle of Beth-Horon – Jewish forces led by Eleazar ben Simon defeated a Roman punitive force led by Cestius Gallus, Governor of Syria
  - 73 – Siege of Masada – The Sicarii were defeated by the Romans under Lucius Flavius Silva, leading them to commit mass suicide
- Year of the Four Emperors (68–69) – Roman war of succession between various Roman pretenders following the death of Nero (AD 68). After Nero's suicide, the generals Galba, Otho, and Vitellius took the throne within months of each other. General Vespasian, who until that point had been fighting the revolt in Judaea, was victorious, and founded the Flavian dynasty.
  - 68: Revolt in Gallia Lugdunensis under Gaius Julius Vindex – revolt suppressed by Lucius Verginius Rufus' army
  - 69 –
    - Winter – Battle of 'Forum Julii' – Othonian forces defeated a small group of Vitellianist auxiliaries in Gallia Narbonensis
    - 14 April – First Battle of Bedriacum – Vitellius, commander of the Rhine armies, defeated Emperor Otho and seized the throne.
    - 24 October – Second Battle of Bedriacum – Forces under Antonius Primus, the commander of the Danube armies, loyal to Vespasian, defeated the forces of Emperor Vitellius.
  - 69–70: Revolt of the Batavi, Treveri and Lingones in Gaul – revolt suppressed
- 69: Revolt of Anicetus in Colchis – revolt suppressed by Virdius Geminus
- 79–80: Failed usurpation of Terentius Maximus, a Pseudo-Nero, in Asia
- 89: Revolt of Lucius Antonius Saturninus with two legions in Germania Superior – revolt suppressed

== 2nd century ==
- 115-117: Kitos War – traditionalist Jewish revolt against Rome
- 132-135/136: Bar Kokhba revolt – traditionalist Jewish revolt against Rome
- 172–175: Bucolic war – native Egyptian resistance against Roman rule in Egypt.
- 175: Failed usurpation of Avidius Cassius - Avidius Cassius assassinated by one of his own centurions
- 186: Soldiers led by Maternus desert the army and raid some towns in Gaul and Spain. They are dispersed at the sight of a Roman army sent against them.
- 193-197: Year of the Five Emperors - Roman war of succession between the generals Septimius Severus, Pescennius Niger and Clodius Albinus following the assassination of Commodus (AD 192) and the subsequent murders of Pertinax and Didius Julianus (AD 193). Severus was victorious and founded the Severan dynasty.
  - 193 – Battle of Cyzicus – Septimius Severus, the new Emperor, defeated his eastern rival Pescennius Niger
  - 193 – Battle of Nicaea – Severus again defeated Niger
  - 194 – Battle of Issus – Severus finally defeated Niger.
  - 197, 19 February – Battle of Lugdunum – Emperor Septimius Severus defeated and killed his rival Clodius Albinus, securing full control over the Empire.

== 3rd century ==
- 215: Alexandrian Revolts (215) – native Egyptian resistance against Roman rule in Egypt.
- 218, 8 June: Battle of Antioch, fought between the Emperor Macrinus and his rival Elagabalus (Varius Avitus) and resulting in Macrinus' downfall and his replacement by Elagabalus.
- 219: Failed usurpations of Verus and Gellius Maximus in Syria.
- 221: Failed usurpation of Seleucus, possibly in Moesia
- 227: Failed usurpation of Seius Sallustius in Rome
- 232: Failed usurpation of Taurinius in Syria.

=== Crisis of the Third Century ===
- 235–284: Crisis of the Third Century – at least 26 claimants fought with each other to become emperor and emperors fought against usurpers, resulting in frequent civil war and breakaway Gallic Roman (260–274) and Palmyrene Empires (270–273).
- 238: Year of the Six Emperors between various generals against Maximinus Thrax and after his murder.
  - 238 – Battle of Carthage – Troops loyal to the Roman Emperor Maximinus Thrax defeat and kill his successor Gordian II. After Gordian I and Gordian II are defeated by a pro-Maximinus Army following an attempt to overthrow the emperor, Maximinus is assassinated. Pupienus, Balbinus, and Gordian III replace him, but the former two are assassinated within months and only Gordian III survives.
- 240: Failed usurpation of Sabinianus in Mauretania
- 248–249: Failed usurpations of Jotapianus in Syria and Pacatianus in Moesia.
- 249: Emperor Philip the Arab killed and overthrown by rebels at the Battle of Verona and replaced by Decius.
- 250: Failed usurpation of Licinianus in Rome.
- 251: Failed usurpation of Titus Julius Priscus in Thrace.
- 252: Failed usurpation of Cyriades in Syria.
- 253: Usurpations of Aemilianus and Valerian: Emperors Trebonianus Gallus and Volusianus murdered by their soldiers and replaced by Aemilianus. Valerian raises the Rhine legions in revolt, while Aemilianus is killed by his own soldiers.
- 254: Failed usurpation of Uranius in Syria.
- 260: Failed usurpations of Ingenuus and Regalianus in Pannonia; possibly of Sponsianus in Dacia.
- 260–261: Failed usurpation of Macrianus Major, Macrianus Minor, Quietus and Balista in the East
- 260–274: The breakaway Gallic Empire
- 261: Failed usurpations of Lucius Piso and Valens Thessalonicus in Achaea.
- 261–262: Failed usurpation of Mussius Aemilianus and Memor in Egypt.
- 267: Failed usurpation of Maeonius in Palmyra.
- 268: Failed usurpation of Aureolus in the West. Emperor Gallienus murdered by his soldiers and Claudius Gothicus proclaimed Emperor.
- 270: Usurpation of Aurelian against Quintillus.
- Palmyrene war between Rome and the breakaway Palmyrene Empire.
  - 270 – Palmyrene invasion of Egypt – Palmyrene victory
  - 272 –
    - Battle of Immae – Aurelian defeats the army of Zenobia of Palmyra
    - Battle of Emesa – Aurelian decisively defeats Zenobia.
- 271: Failed usurpations of Felicissimus in Rome and Septimius in Dalmatia.
- 274 – Battle of Châlons – Aurelian defeats the Gallic usurper Tetricus, reestablishing central control of the whole empire.
- 275: Aurelian murdered by the Praetorian Guard and replaced by Marcus Claudius Tacitus
- 276: Usurpation of Probus against Florianus.
- 280: Failed usurpation of Julius Saturninus in the East.
- 280–281: Failed usurpation of Proculus and Bonosus in the West.
- 282: Probus assassinated by his soldiers. The new emperor Carus may have been involved in the plotting.
- 283–285: Failed usurpation of Sabinus Julianus.
- 284–285: Usurpation of Diocletian against Carinus
  - 285 – Battle of the Margus – The usurper Diocletian defeated the army of the Emperor Carinus, who was killed.

=== Post-crisis ===
- 284–286: Bagaudae uprising in Gaul under Aelianus and Amandus – revolt suppressed
- 286–296: Carausian revolt under Carausius and Allectus in Britain and northern Gaul – revolt suppressed
- 229–293: Native Egyptian revolt of the towns of Busiris and Coptos in the Egyptian city of Thebes – revolt suppressed by Galerius
- 297–298: Failed usurpation of Domitius Domitianus and Achilleus in Egypt – Siege of Alexandria

== 4th century ==
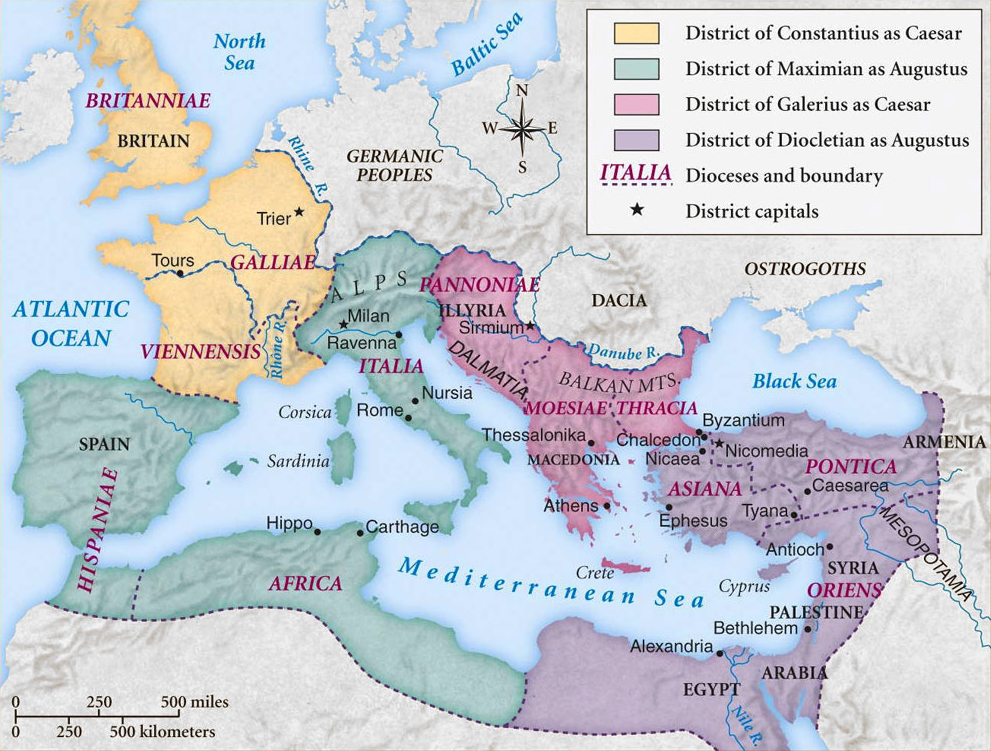
The Roman Empire under the Tetrarchy, with the territory of Constantius (yellow), Maximian (green), Galerius (pink), and Diocletian (purple)

The 4th century begins with civil war resulting in the ascendancy of Constantine I, then, after his death, the progressive Christianization of the empire, and wars with Sassanid Persia and Germanic tribes, punctuated frequently with more civil wars.

- 303: Failed usurpation of Eugenius in Roman Syria
- Civil wars of the Tetrarchy (306–324), beginning with the usurpation of Maxentius and the defeat of Flavius Valerius Severus, and ending with the defeat of Licinius at the hands of Constantine I in 324. The Tetrarchy established by Diocletian would break up because of these wars.
  - 312 –
    - Battle of Turin – Constantine I defeats forces loyal to Maxentius.
    - Battle of Verona – Constantine I defeats more forces loyal to Maxentius.
    - 28 October – Battle of Milvian Bridge – Constantine I defeats Maxentius and takes control of Italy.
  - 313, 30 April – Battle of Tzirallum – In the eastern part of the Empire, the forces of Licinius defeat Maximinus.
  - 316, 8 October – Battle of Cibalae – Constantine defeats Licinius
  - 316 or 317 – Battle of Mardia – Constantine again defeats Licinius, who cedes Illyricum to Constantine.
  - 324 –
    - 3 July – Battle of Adrianople – Constantine defeats Licinius, who flees to Byzantium
    - July – Battle of the Hellespont – Flavius Julius Crispus, son of Constantine, defeats the naval forces of Licinius
    - 18 September – Battle of Chrysopolis – Constantine decisively defeats Licinius, establishing his sole control over the empire.
- 334: Failed usurpation of Calocaerus in Cyprus
- 337: Caesars Dalmatius and Hannibalianus killed by soldiers in a purge orchestrated by Constantius II.
- 340: Civil war, when Constans defeated and killed his brother Constantine II in an ambush near Aquileia.
- Roman civil war of 350–353, when Constantius II defeated the usurper Magnentius who had assassinated Constans.
  - 351 – Battle of Mursa Major – Emperor Constantius II defeats the usurper Magnentius
  - 353 – Battle of Mons Seleucus – Final defeat of Magnentius by Constantius II
- Jewish revolt against Constantius Gallus – 351–352 - Rebellion of Jews in Syria Palaestina – revolt suppressed
- 355: Failed usurpation of Claudius Silvanus in Gaul
- 361: Usurpation of Julian the Apostate
- 365–366: Revolt of Procopius, when the Emperor Valens defeated the usurpers Procopius and Marcellus.
- Civil War – 366 – Battle of Thyatira – The army of the Roman emperor Valens defeats the usurper Procopius.
- Great Conspiracy – 367-368 - Rebellion in the Hadrian's Wall and failed invasion of Britain by Picts, Scotti, Attacotti, Saxons and Franks.
- 372: Failed usurpation of Theodorus in Antioch
- 372–375: Revolt of Firmus in Africa – revolt suppressed by Count Theodosius
- Tanukh revolt against Rome– 378-Spring - the Tanukhids Arabs rebels against Roman rule, led by their queen Mavia in Syria. The revolt end in a truce.
- 383–384: Usurpation of Magnus Maximus in the west and the killing of Gratian by the general Andragathius
- 387: Tax riots against Emperor Theodosius I in Antioch.
- 387–388: Battle of Poetovio, when the Eastern Emperor Theodosius I defeated the usurper / Western Emperor Magnus Maximus.
- 390: Revolt in Thessalonica culminating in the Massacre of Thessalonica.
- Civil war of 392–394
  - 394, 5–6 September – Battle of the Frigidus, when the Eastern Emperor Theodosius I defeated the usurper / Western Emperor Eugenius and his Frankish magister militum Arbogast.
- 395: Gothic War (395-398) - Gothic revolt of Alaric I
- 398: Gildonic War – Comes Gildo, governor of Africa, rebelled against the Western Emperor Honorius. The revolt was subdued by Flavius Stilicho, the magister militum of the Western Roman Empire.
- 399–400: Gothic Revolt of Tribigild and Gainas in the Eastern Empire – revolt suppressed

== 5th century ==
- 407–415: Roman Civil war of 407–415: Civil war as the usurpers Marcus, Gratian, Constantine III, Constans II (son of Constantine III), Maximus of Hispania, Priscus Attalus, Jovinus, Sebastianus and Heraclianus tried to usurp the throne of Emperor Honorius. All were defeated.
  - 407: Sarus campaign against Constantine III
  - 408-409: Resistance of Honorius cousins
  - 409–417: Bagaudae uprising in the Loire valley and Brittany
  - 411: Battle of Vienne
  - 411: Battle of Arles (411)
  - 412–413: War of Heraclianus
- 416–418; Gothic War in Spain (416–418)
- 419–421: Revolt of Maximus in the Diocese of Hispania – revolt suppressed
- 422: Vandal war of 422 in Diocese of Hispania – the Romans leads a defeat.
- 423–425: Roman civil war of 425, when the usurper Joannes was defeated by the army of Emperor Valentinian III.
- 425–426: Gothic revolt of Theodoric I
- 427–429: Roman civil war of 427–429, when the Comes Africae Bonifacius fought inconclusively against the Magister militum Felix. The civil war was terminated by negotiations brokered by Galla Placidia.
- 428: Frankish War (428)
- 429–435: Vandal conquest of Roman Africa
  - 429: Battle of Calama
  - 430–431: Siege of Hippo Regius
- 430: Gothic revolt of Anaolsus
- 430–431: Aetius campaign in the Alps
- 431–432: Frankish War (431–432)
- 432: Roman civil war of 432 when the Magister militum Flavius Aetius was defeated by the rival Magister militum Bonifacius, who died of wounds sustained in battle soon afterwards, giving Aetius full control over the Western Empire.
  - Battle of Rimini (432)
- 435
  - 435–436: Burgundian Revolt of Gunther – Flavius Aetius defects the Burgundians.
  - 435–441 Second Bagaudae uprising under Tibatto (435-437) and Eudoxius (441) in Gaul suppressed by Flavius Aetius.
- 436
  - 436–439: Gothic War (436–439)
    - 436: Battle of Narbonne – Flavius Aetius again defeats the Visigoths led by Theodoric I.
    - 438: Battle of Mons Colubrarius
    - 439: Battle of Toulouse – Visigoths led by Theodoric I defeat Romans under General Litorius, who is killed.
- 439–442 Vandal War (439–442)
  - 19 October – Battle of Carthage – Romans lose Carthage to the Vandals.
- 455: Valentinian III assassinated and overthrown by Petronius Maximus.
- 455: Petronius Maximus stoned to death by mob and replaced by Avitus.
- 456
  - Gothic War in Spain (456) – A Visigothic army, led by Theodoric II recaptures Spain on behalf of the West Roman Empire.
  - Battle of Agrigentum (456) – An army of the Western Roman Empire, led by the Romano-Suebian general Ricimer, drove off an invading fleet sent by the Vandal king Gaiseric to raid Sicily.
  - Battle of Corsica – the Vandals were attacked by Ricimer and defeated.
  - Roman civil war of 456, when Emperor Avitus was defeated by the revolvers Majorianus and Ricimer.
- 461: Roman civil war of 461 – Majorian assassinated and overthrown by Ricimer, civil war of the general Ricimer against the generals Aegidius, Marcellinus an Nepotianus
- 461–468 Vandal War (461–468)
  - 468 Battle of Cap Bon (468)
- 462-463 Gothic war against Aegidius
- 468-471 Gothic revolt of Euric
  - Battle of Angers
  - Failed usurpation by Arvandus.
  - Failed usurpation by Romanus.
- 472: Anthemius overthrown by Ricimer.
- 473-475: Spanish War of Euric
- 474: Roman civil war of 474 – Glycerius overthrown by Julius Nepos.
- 475: Roman civil war of 475 – Julius Nepos overthrown by Orestes.
- 476: Orestes overthrown by Odoacer. Romulus Augustulus deposed, ending the Western Roman Empire.
- 486: Franco-Roman War of 486 Roman Army of Syagrius overthrown by Clovis I

== Sources ==
- Jones, Jim (2013). "Roman History Timeline" (PDF). West Chester University of Pennsylvania. Archived from the original (PDF) on 2 April 2023.
- Kohn, George Childs, 'Dictionary of Wars, Revised Edition' (Checkmark Books, New York, 1999)
