= 82 BC =

82 BC in various calendars
- Gregorian calendar: 82 BC; LXXXII BC
- Ab urbe condita: 672
- Ancient Egypt era: XXXIII dynasty, 242
- Pharaoh: Ptolemy IX Lathyros, 7
- Ancient Greek Olympiad (summer): 174th Olympiad, year 3
- Assyrian calendar: 4669
- Balinese saka calendar: N/A
- Bengali calendar: −675 – −674
- Berber calendar: 869
- Buddhist calendar: 463
- Burmese calendar: −719
- Byzantine calendar: 5427–5428
- Chinese calendar: 戊戌年 (Earth Dog); 2616 or 2409 — to — 己亥年 (Earth Pig); 2617 or 2410
- Coptic calendar: −365 – −364
- Discordian calendar: 1085
- Ethiopian calendar: −89 – −88
- Hebrew calendar: 3679–3680
- Hindu calendars
- Vikram Samvat: −25 – −24
- Shaka Samvat: N/A
- Kali Yuga: 3019–3020
- Holocene calendar: 9919
- Iranian calendar: 703 BP – 702 BP
- Islamic calendar: 725 BH – 724 BH
- Javanese calendar: N/A
- Julian calendar: N/A
- Korean calendar: 2252
- Minguo calendar: 1993 before ROC 民前1993年
- Nanakshahi calendar: −1549
- Seleucid era: 230/231 AG
- Thai solar calendar: 461–462
- Tibetan calendar: ས་ཕོ་ཁྱི་ལོ་ (male Earth-Dog); 45 or −336 or −1108 — to — ས་མོ་ཕག་ལོ་ (female Earth-Boar); 46 or −335 or −1107

Year 82 BC was a year of the pre-Julian Roman calendar. At the time it was known as the Year of the Consulship of Marius and Carbo (or, less frequently, year 672 Ab urbe condita). The denomination 82 BC for this year has been used since the early medieval period, when the Anno Domini calendar era became the prevalent method in Europe for naming years.

== Events ==
=== By place ===
==== Roman Republic ====
- April: Sulla defeats the consul Gaius Marius the Younger at the Battle of Sacriportus, and takes control of Rome.
- November 1: Sulla defeats an army of Samnites and Lucanians alliance in the Battle of the Colline Gate.
- November 2: Sulla slaughters the Samnite prisoners in the Villa publica; the senate rejects his proscription plan.
- November 3: Sulla passes his proscription through a popular assembly; he publishes a list of 520 senators and equites to be murdered on sight.
- Gaius Marius the Younger is besieged at the fortress city of Praeneste in Latium. After a fierce resistance, Marius commits suicide.
- Pompey is ordered by Sulla to stamp out Marian rebels in Sicily and Africa, after his campaigns in he gets the insulting nickname of adulescentulus carnifex, the "teenage butcher".
- Lucius Licinius Murena launches a raid against Pontus in the Battle of Halys, starting the Second Mithridatic War.

==== Dacia ====
- Burebista unifies the Dacian population forming the first (and biggest) unified Dacian Kingdom, on the territory of modern Romania and surroundings. 82 BC is also the starting year of his reign.

=== By topic ===
==== Astronomy ====
- The Aurigid shower parent comet C/1911 N1 (Kiess) returns to the inner solar system and sheds the dust particles that one revolution later cause the 1935, 1986, 1994, and 2007 Aurigid meteor outbursts on Earth.

== Births ==
- May 28 – Licinius Macer Calvus, Roman orator and poet (d. c. 47 BC)
- Marcus Caelius Rufus, Roman orator and politician (d. c. 48 BC)
- Varro Atacinus, Roman poet and writer (d. c. 35 BC)
- Vercingetorix, Gaul warrior and leader (d. 46 BC)

== Deaths ==
- Gaius Carrinas, Roman politician and general (executed by order of Sulla)
- Gaius Fabius Hadrianus, Roman politician and governor
- Gaius Marcius Censorinus, Roman politician and general (executed by order of Sulla)
- Gaius Marius the Younger, Roman politician (commits suicide)
- Gaius Norbanus, Roman consul and governor (commits suicide)
- Gnaeus Papirius Carbo, Roman consul (executed by order of Sulla)
- Marcus Marius Gratidianus, Roman praetor and politician (executed by order of Sulla)
- Quintus Mucius Scaevola Pontifex, Roman consul (murdered by order of Marius the Younger)
- Quintus Valerius Soranus, Roman politician and Latin poet (executed by order of Sulla)
