= Publius Servilius Vatia Isauricus =

Roman general and statesman, consul 79 BCE

Consul of the Roman Republic
- In office January 79 BC – December 79 BC Serving with Appius Claudius Pulcher
- Preceded by: Lucius Cornelius Sulla and Quintus Caecilius Metellus Pius
- Succeeded by: Marcus Aemilius Lepidus and Quintus Lutatius Catulus

Personal details
- Born: c. 134 BC
- Died: 44 BC Rome
- Party: Sullan
- Children: Publius Servilius Vatia Isauricus and Servilia

Military service
- Commands: The 78-74 BC campaign against the Cilician pirates and the Isaurian hill tribes

Publius Servilius Vatia Isauricus (c. 134 BC – 44 BC), was a politician and general of the Roman Republic and a member of the plebeian branch of the gens Servilii. He was elected consul for 79 BC with Appius Claudius Pulcher as his consular collegae. From 78 to 74 BC, as proconsul of Cilicia, he fought against the Cilician Pirates and Isaurian hill tribes in Asia Minor. He was granted the agnomen Isauricus for his victories over the Isaurians. Upon returning to Rome he celebrated a triumph for his victories.

== Early career and supporter of Sulla ==
Isauricus was the son of Gaius Servilius Vatia and a member of the plebeian branch of the gens Servilii, while his mother was Caecilia Metella, daughter of Quintus Caecilius Metellus Macedonicus.

A traditionalist, he was among the group of young Roman nobles who killed Lucius Appuleius Saturninus in the Curia Hostilia after his failed revolt. It has been conjectured that he served as plebeian tribune in 97 BC. He held the office of praetor in 90 BC, following which he was given a propraetoreal governorship in 89 BC, with his province being either Corsica et Sardinia or Cilicia. Because of victories in his province, Isauricus was awarded a triumph in 88 BC upon his return to Rome.

In 88 BC, with the support of the consul Lucius Cornelius Sulla, Isauricus put himself forward as Sulla's preferred candidate for the consular elections of 87 BC, but was defeated in the subsequent election by Lucius Cornelius Cinna, a supporter of Gaius Marius. In 87 BC, he was one of Sulla's lieutenants in Italy, and he attempted to stop the return of Gaius Marius and his supporters, but was driven from Ariminum by Marcus Marius Gratidianus, who took command of his army. Sometime after this defeat he fled Italy to join Sulla in Greece.

In 84 BC, Isauricus returned to Italy with Sulla. He fought under Sulla in the First Battle of Clusium. Later, in September of 82 BC, Vatia Isauricus was one of Metellus's lieutenants at the Second Battle of Clusium. Sulla won the war and became Dictator, in 79 BC, he appointed Vatia Isauricus as consul alongside Appius Claudius Pulcher. While Isauricus was still consul designate, he opposed the awarding of a triumph to the young Pompey.

== Campaign against the pirates ==
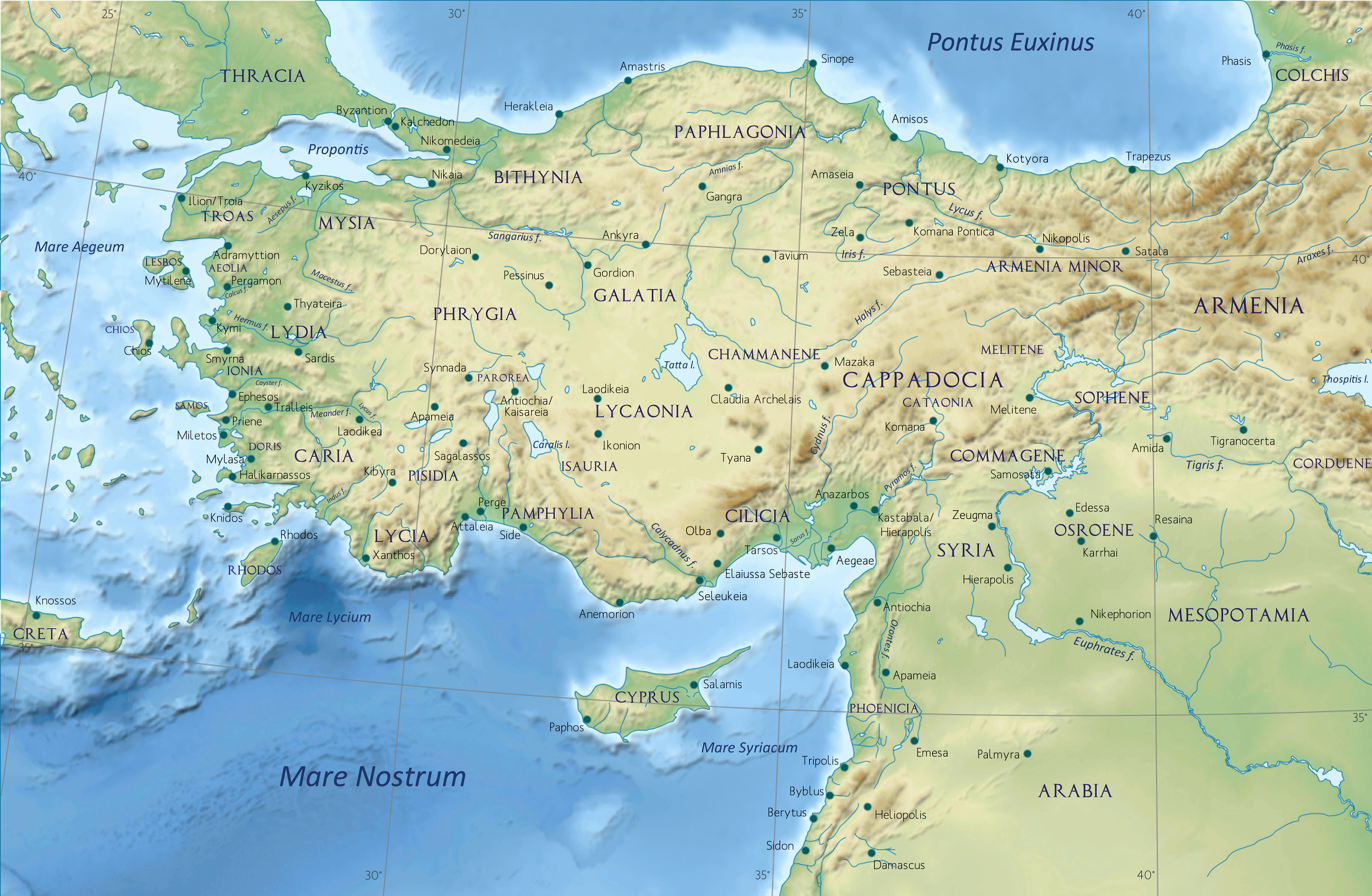
Location of Cilicia within the classical regions of Asia Minor/Anatolia

After his consulship Vatia Isauricus was assigned the post of proconsular governor of Cilicia with the responsibility of clearing out the pirates which had been ravaging shipping for many years. His command lasted from 78 until 74 BC. The first year (78) he allocated to the military preparations, the following two years he fought a combined naval and land campaign against pirates and the Isauri in Cilicia. In 77 and 76 he achieved a number of naval victories against the pirates off the Cilician coast, and was able to occupy the Lycian and Pamphylian coasts. After the pirates fled to their fortified strongholds, Vatia Isauricus began attacking their coastal fortresses. He captured the town of Olympos, the stronghold of brigand Zenicetus. He then went on to capture Phaselis before subduing Corycus and a number of minor pirate strongholds, capturing a number of pirate captains in the process, including the famous Nicon.

In 75 BC, he advanced across the Taurus Mountains, the first time a Roman army crossed these mountains, and succeeded in defeating the Isaurian hill tribes along the northern slopes. He laid siege to their principal town, Isaura, and managed to capture it after diverting the course of a river, thereby depriving the defenders in the town of their only source of water, after which they surrendered. It was during this part of the campaign that he was acclaimed Imperator by his legionaries. By 74 BC, Vatia Isauricus had organized the territory he had conquered and incorporated it into the province of Cilicia. He was succeeded as proconsul of Cilicia by Lucius Octavius who died shortly after arriving. Octavius was succeeded by Lucius Licinius Lucullus who incorporated Vatia Isauricus' veteran troops and fleet into his army when he marched against Mithridates VI of Pontus at the outbreak of the Third Mithridatic War.

Upon his return to Rome, in 74 BC, he was granted a triumph, as well as being awarded the agnomen Isauricus for his victories in Isauria. After parading the captured pirates in his triumph, he deposited the entire war booty he had captured into the treasury and, unlike his peers, kept none for himself, a feat for which he was widely acclaimed.

== Later career ==
By now, Vatia Isauricus was considered one of the leading members of the Roman Senate, and sometime prior to 76 BC, Vatia Isauricus was admitted to the College of Pontiffs. In 70 BC he served as one of the judges in the trial of Gaius Verres. In 66 BC he supported the proposal of Gaius Manilius to give Pompey the command of the renewed war against the pirates. In 63 BC he was a candidate for the position of pontifex maximus, but was defeated by Julius Caesar, who had served him in his war against the pirates the decade before. Towards the end of that same year he had supported the consul Cicero in the suppression of the Catiline conspiracy, and spoke in the senate in favour of imposing the death penalty upon Catiline and his supporters.

In 57 BC he joined the other members of the aristocracy to bring about Cicero's return from banishment, while in the following year (56 BC) he opposed in the senate the restoration of Ptolemy XII Auletes, preferring instead to annex Egypt as a Roman province. In 55 BC he was elected censor, a position he held until at least July 54 BC. During his time as censor, he and his colleague attempted to regulate the stream of the Tiber River after a destructive flood in 54 BC.

From 55 to 44 BC Vatia Isauricus was the Princeps Senatus. Due to his being close to 80 years of age, he took no part in the civil wars. He died in the early summer of 44 BC.

Vatia Isauricus was the father of the consul of 48 BC and 41 BC, Publius Servilius Isauricus. He also had a daughter named Servilia.

== See also ==
- Servilia gens

== Sources ==
- Sumner, G V (1973). The orators in Cicero's Brutus: prosopography and chronology. Heritage. University of Toronto Press. JSTOR 10.3138/j.ctvcj2j22.
- Broughton, T. Robert S., The Magistrates of the Roman Republic, Vol II (1952).
- Smith, William, Dictionary of Greek and Roman Biography and Mythology, Vol III (1867).

Political offices
Preceded by L. Cornelius Sulla Felix; Q. Caecilius Metellus Pius	Roman consul 79 BC; With: Ap. Claudius Pulcher	Succeeded by M. Aemilius Lepidus; Q. Lutatius Catulus
