= Battle of the Asio River (82 BC) =

Civil War

- Part of Sulla's second civil war
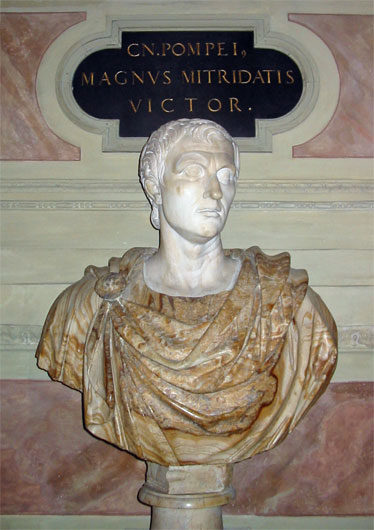
- A bust of Pompey
Date	March 82 BC
Location	Rome, Italy
Result	Optimate victory

Belligerents
Optimates	Populares

Commanders and leaders
Quintus Caecilius Metellus Pius; Pompey	Gaius Carrinas

Strength
Unknown	Unknown

Casualties and losses
Relatively Low	High

The Battle of the Asio River took place in March of 82 BC during the context of Sulla's Second Civil War. The battle pitted the Optimates under the command of Quintus Caecilius Metellus Pius and Pompey against the Populares forces commanded by Gaius Carrinas. This battle marked the start of this phase in the civil war and resulted in an Optimate victory.

== The battle ==
After a brutal winter, fighting commenced between the two opposing forces in the spring fighting season. The Battle for the Asio River (modern name, Esino) was the first battle of the season, taking place on the banks of the river. Fighting was bloody with the Optimate infantry advancing and successfully breaking the Populares infantry who were obliged to fall back. As this was happening, the Optimate cavalry commanded by Gnaeus Pompeius Magnus attacked the retreating Populares forces inflicting heavy casualties.
