= Gaius Carrinas =

Gaius Carrinas may refer to:

- Gaius Carrinas (praetor 82 BC), Roman general and politician
- Gaius Carrinas (consul 43 BC), Roman general and politician
