= Carrinatia gens =

Ancient Roman family

The gens Carrinatia was a plebeian family at ancient Rome. Members of this gens rose to prominence during the final century of the Republic, attaining the consulship in 43 BC.

== Origin ==
The nomen Carrinas, occasionally written Carinas, is one of the more unusual forms appearing in Roman history. Havercamp supposed it to be a cognomen of the Albia gens, but the nomen Albius does not appear with it in any known inscriptions. The gentilicium is probably of Umbrian or Etruscan origin; several scholars find the latter more likely, notwithstanding that Umbrian nomina frequently end in -as.

== Praenomina ==
The main praenomen of the Carrinates was Gaius, among the most common of all praenomina throughout Roman history. A few members of this gens are mentioned with the common praenomen Quintus, and from a filiation it appears that they may also have used Aulus.

== Branches and cognomina ==
None of the Carrinates mentioned at the end of the Republic bore any surnames. A wide variety of cognomina appear under the Empire, none of which seem to have become hereditary. Most of the Carrinates known from inscriptions appear to have been freedmen or their descendants. The senatorial Carrinates of the late Republic seem to have belonged to the tribe Quirina, or, less likely, Collina.

== Members ==
This list includes abbreviated praenomina. For an explanation of this practice, see filiation.

- Gaius Carrinas, a commander loyal to Marius and Gnaeus Papirius Carbo during Sulla's civil war. He sustained a series of defeats at the hands of Sulla's forces, ending with the Battle of the Colline Gate, following which he was captured and put to death.
- Gaius Carrinas C. f., sent by Caesar against Sextus Pompeius in Spain following the Battle of Munda, in 45 BC; he was consul suffectus for the last part of 43, and subsequently became one of Octavian's commanders. He triumphed over the Morini and Suebi in 29.
- Carrinas, a guest of Cicero in 45 BC; the orator found his company unpleasant.
- Carrinas Secundus, an orator during the reign of Caligula, who banished him after he spoke unwisely on the subject of tyranny. The Carrinas Secundus sent by Nero to plunder Asia and Achaea was probably the same man.

=== Carrinates from inscriptions ===
- Carrinatia, named in a first-century inscription from Rome, along with Gaius Carrinas.
- Gaius Carrinas, a public official named in a first-century inscription from Rome, along with a Carrinatia.
- Gaius Carrinas, a soldier buried at Antioch in Pisidia, with a tomb built by his brother-in-arms, the cavalry Decurion Lucius Julius Turrus.
- Gaius Carrinas C. [...], dedicated a sepulchre at Rome for himself and his wife, Clodia Apa[...].
- Quintus Carrinas C. f., one of the Duumviri Aediles at Alba Pompeia in Liguria during the first half of the first century AD. He had been a centurion primus pilus.
- Carrinatia C. l. Aegiale, a freedwoman buried at Rome, aged twenty-one, with a tomb dedicated by her former master, Gaius Carrinas Hesper.
- Gaius Carrinas C. l. Aphrodisius, a freedman buried at Tarentum in Apulia, in a tomb dating to the early decades of the Empire.
- Carrinatia Arethusa, named in an inscription from Rome.
- Gaius Carrinas C. l. Ascla[...], a freedman named in an inscription from Rome, along with Gaius Carrinas Philar[...].
- Gaius Carrinas Cerdo, named in a first-century inscription from Rome, along with Carrinatia Fausta.
- Gaius Carrinas C. l. Chrestus, a freedman buried at Rome during the first half of the first century, together with Carrinatia Fausta.
- Carrinatia C. l. Fausta, a freedwoman buried at Rome during the first half of the first century, together with Gaius Carrinas Chrestus.
- Carrinatia Fausta, named in a first-century inscription from Rome, along with Gaius Carrinas Cerdo.
- Carrinatia Fausta, according to a dedicatory inscription from Rome, donated four pots in the name of Eros Hilara.
- Gaius Carrinas Felicissimus, one of several Carrinates named in a dedicatory inscription from Tarracina in Latium during the first century AD.
- Gaius Carrinas Felix, one of several Carrinates named in a first-century inscription from Tarracina.
- Gaius Carrinas C. l. Flaccus, a freedman named as the donor of two pots in an inscription from Rome, dating to the first half of the first century.
- Gaius Carrinas Fortunatus, one of several Carrinates named in a first-century inscription from Tarracina.
- Gaius Carrinas Galerianus, buried at Rome.
- Gaius Carrinas Hesper, dedicated a tomb at Rome to his freedwoman, Carrinatia Aegiale.
- Carrinas A. l. Hilarus, a freedman buried at Hasta Pompeia in Liguria, together with Carrinatia Nymphis.
- Gaius Carrinas C. l. Marmarida, a freedman named in a first-century inscription from Rome, along with Carrinatia Philusa.
- Carrinatia Ɔ. l. Nymphis, a freedwoman buried at Hasta Pompeia, aged seventeen, along with Carrinas Hilarus.
- Gaius Carrinas C. l. Philar[...], a freedman named in an inscription from Rome, along with Gaius Carrinas Ascla[...].
- Gaius Carrinas C. l. Philo, a freedman named in an inscription from Rome, along with Carrinatia Selenio.
- Carrinas Philetus, buried at Rome, in the family sepulchre of the scribe Cluvius Formica, who describes him as a "brother".
- Carrinatia Philusa, named in a first-century inscription from Rome, along with the freedman Gaius Carrinas Marmarida.
- Gaius Carrinas Prepo, dedicated a first- or second-century tomb at Rome to Gaius Julius Heraclio.
- Carrinatia Prima, named along with the freedwoman Carrinatia Urbana in an inscription from Rome dating to the first half of the first century.
- Carrinatia Ɔ. l. Prima, a freedwoman buried at Rome, along with the freedman Publius Calpurnius Anteros, in a tomb dating to the first half of the first century.
- Quintus Carrinas Quadratus, a soldier named in a military diploma from Moesia Superior, dating to AD 96.
- Carrinatia C. l. Selenio, a freedwoman named in an inscription from Rome, along with Gaius Carrinas Philo.
- Gaius Carrinas Severus, buried in a first-century sepulchre at Rome.
- Gaius Carrinas Suavis, one of several Carrinates named in a first-century inscription from Tarracina.
- Carrinatia C. l. Urbana, a freedwoman named along with Carrinatia Prima in an inscription from Rome, dating to the first half of the first century.

== See also ==
- List of Roman gentes

== Bibliography ==
- Marcus Tullius Cicero, Epistulae ad Atticum.
- Decimus Junius Juvenalis, Satirae (Satires).
- Publius Cornelius Tacitus, Annales.
- Lucius Mestrius Plutarchus (Plutarch), Lives of the Noble Greeks and Romans.
- Appianus Alexandrinus (Appian), Bellum Civile (The Civil War).
- Lucius Cassius Dio Cocceianus (Cassius Dio), Roman History.
- Eutropius, Breviarium Historiae Romanae (Abridgement of the History of Rome).
- Paulus Orosius, Historiarum Adversum Paganos (History Against the Pagans).
- Sigebert Havercamp, Thesaurus Morelliantes (1734).
- Dictionary of Greek and Roman Biography and Mythology, William Smith, ed., Little, Brown and Company, Boston (1849).
- Theodor Mommsen et alii, Corpus Inscriptionum Latinarum (The Body of Latin Inscriptions, abbreviated CIL), Berlin-Brandenburgische Akademie der Wissenschaften (1853–present).
- Bullettino della Commissione Archeologica Comunale in Roma (Bulletin of the Municipal Archaeological Commission of Rome, abbreviated BCAR), (1872–present).
- René Cagnat et alii, L'Année épigraphique (The Year in Epigraphy, abbreviated AE), Presses Universitaires de France (1888–present).
- Chase, George Davis (1897). "The Origin of Roman Praenomina". Harvard Studies in Classical Philology. 8: 103–184. JSTOR 310491.
- Syme, Ronald (1939). The Roman Revolution. Oxford University Press.
- Inschriften Griechischer Städte aus Kleinasien (Inscriptions from the Greek Cities of Asia Minor), Bonn (1973–present).
- T. Robert S. Broughton, The Magistrates of the Roman Republic, American Philological Association (1952–1986).
- Taylor, Lily Ross (2013) [1960]. Jerzy Linderski (ed.). The Voting Districts of the Roman Republic: The Thirty-five Urban and Rural Tribes. Ann Arbor: University of Michigan Press. ISBN 978-0-472-11869-4.
