= Battle of Sena Gallica =

Battle of Sena Gallica may refer to:

- Battle of Sena Gallica (82 BC), part of the first Roman Civil War where Sulla's forces under Gnaeus Pompeius Magnus defeated their Populares rivals under Gaius Marcius Censorinus
- Battle of Sena Gallica (551), naval battle fought between the Byzantine Empire and the Ostrogothic Kingdom resulting in a Byzantine victory
