= First Battle of Clusium =

81 BCE battle in the Roman Republic

- Part of Sulla's Second Civil War
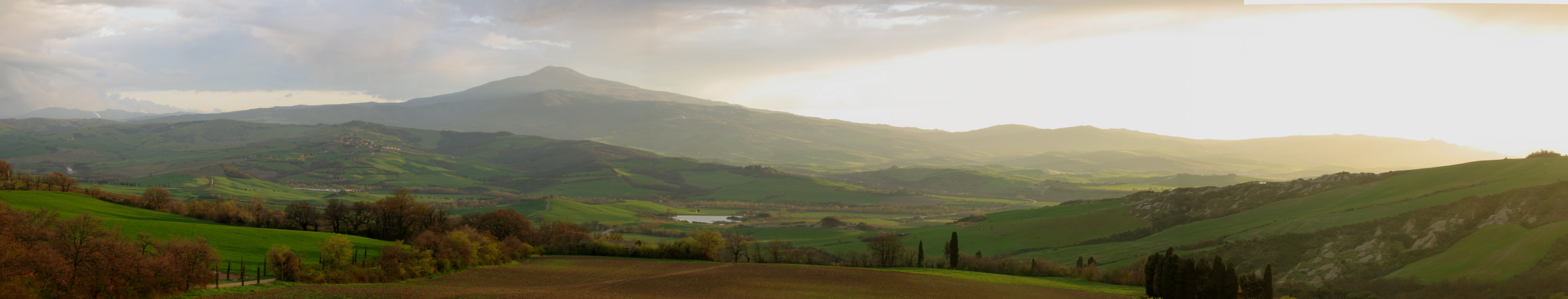
- A bust of Lucius Cornelius Sulla Felix.
Date	June, 82 BC
Location	Clusium, Italia
Result	Indecisive

Belligerents
Optimates	Populares

Commanders and leaders
Lucius Cornelius Sulla Felix	Gnaeus Papirius Carbo

The First Battle of Clusium took place in June of 82 BC during the Roman Republic's Second Civil War. The battle pitted the Optimates under the command of Lucius Cornelius Sulla against the Populares commanded by Gnaeus Papirius Carbo. The battle was indecisive.

== Background ==
During the campaigns of 83-82 BC, the Populares forces had divided into two groups, those in the north under the command of Gnaeus Papirius Carbo, and those in the south who were commanded by Gaius Marius the Younger. Sulla had defeated Marius at the Battle of Sacriporto and afterwards had managed to pin Marius and his survivors at Praeneste. While Praeneste was being besieged Sulla himself moved on to Rome. The capital surrendered allowing Sulla to march against Carbo. The war now shifted to Etruria where Sulla engaged Carbo's cavalry forces near the River Clanis, emerging victorious.

== The battle ==
According to Appian, the two armies eventually met on the outskirts of Clusium. After a bloody battle, the armies separated at nightfall. The battle is generally referred to as a stalemate, but the German scholar, Theodor Mommsen affirmed the following:

The battle remained indecisive, however, Carbo gained a clear advantage as he detained his adversaries' march. – Theodor Mommsen

Philip Matyszak disagrees:

Though Carbo thereby succeeded in checking Sulla's northern advance, it appears he achieved this by pulling manpower from other government forces operating in the north. Certainly his other generals had a rough time of it.

== Aftermath ==
The next day Sulla retreated from the area, leaving Carbo behind at Clusium. Sulla had heard that the Siege of Praeneste was threatened by a huge force of Samnites and Lucanians, who had finally decided to join Marius and Carbo.

Eventually, Sulla and the Samnite-Lucanian army would meet at Rome where Sulla defeated them in the highly contested Battle of the Colline Gate. Meanwhile, Metellus, the commander of Sulla's northern forces, had been victorious in Picenum and marched down to Clusium where he defeated the remaining Populares in the Second Battle of Clusium (82 BC).

Praeneste fell on 4 November, holding out surprisingly until all of Italy was under Sulla's direct control.

== See also ==
- Sulla's Second Civil War
