= Battle of Sena Gallica (82 BC) =

- Part of Sulla's Second Civil War
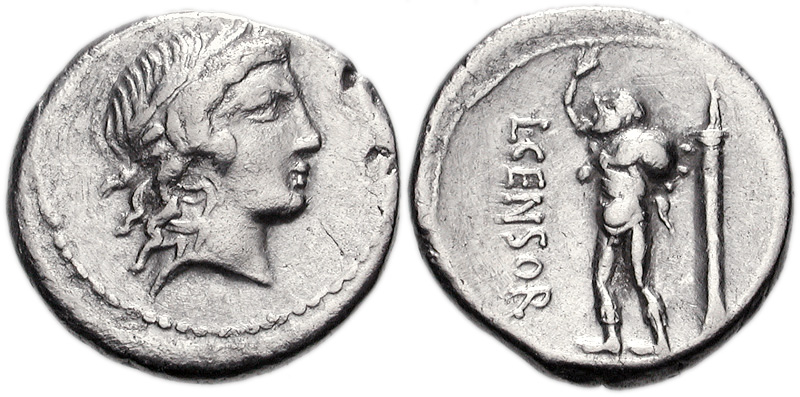
- Roman coins bearing the image of Gaius Marcius Censorinus.
Date	April, 82 BC
Location	Senigallia, Italia
Result	Optimate victory

Belligerents
Optimates	Populares

Commanders and leaders
Lucius Cornelius Sulla Felix; Gnaeus Pompeius Magnus	Gaius Marcius Censorinus; Gnaeus Papirius Carbo

Strength
Unknown	Unknown

Casualties and losses
Unknown	Unknown

The Battle of Sena Gallica took place in April or May of 82 BC during the context of Sulla's Second Civil War in the area around present day Senigallia. The battle pitted the Optimates under the command of Gnaeus Pompeius Magnus, legatus of Lucius Cornelius Sulla Felix against the Populares forces commanded by Gaius Marcius Censorinus who was in turn the legatus of Gnaeus Papirius Carbo. The battle resulted in a decisive Optimate victory. Immediately following the battle, the town was subjected to a brutal sacking by Sulla's victorious forces.

== Context ==
After signing the peace treaty at Dardanos, Sulla returned to Rome with the intention of confronting his other political opponents, the Populares. They were led by Gaius Marius the Younger and by Gnaeus Papirius Carbo. Sulla therefore invaded Italia in 83 BC, routing various Populares armies. Encamping for the winter, both sides made preparations to continue the fighting with the start of the Spring war season when the war became intensified and bloody.

== See also ==
- List of Roman wars and battles
