= Busiri =

Busiri may refer to:

- Al-Busiri, Sanhaji Berber Sufi poet belonging
- Giovanni Battista Busiri (1698–1757), Italian painter
- Busiri Suryowinoto, governor of Irian Jaya

== See also ==
- Busiris (disambiguation)
