= Gaius Carrinas (consul) =

Roman general and politician

Gaius Carrinas was a Roman politician, general and consul.

In 45 BC, Carrinas was sent on the orders of Julius Caesar to Spain to fight Sextus and Gnaeus Pompeius. As he was unsuccessful in putting down the two Pompeii and the last remnants of the Republicans, he was superseded by Gaius Asinius Pollio. After the establishment of the Second Triumvirate in 43 BC, Carrinas together with Publius Ventidius Bassus was appointed consul suffectus for the remainder of the year. In 41 BC, Octavian made Carrinas governor of Spain, where he warred with Bocchus II. In 36 BC, Octavian sent him with three legions against Sextus Pompeius in Sicily. In 31 BC Carrinas was made proconsular governor of Gaul, where he successfully fought against the rebellious Morini and drove the invading Suebi back across the Rhine, for which he was honoured with a triumph in 29 BC.

Carrinas was the son of the Marian commander Gaius Carrinas. Havercamp supposed Carrinas to be a cognomen of the Albia gens, but as the names never appear together in inscriptions, and Umbrian nomina frequently end in -as, it seems that the Carrinates were a separate gens of Oscan or Umbrian origin.

== See also ==
- Carrinatia gens

== Bibliography ==
- Appianus Alexandrinus (Appian), Bellum Civile (The Civil War), iv. 83, v. 26, 112.
- Lucius Cassius Dio Cocceianus (Cassius Dio), Roman History, xlvii. 15, li. 21, 22.
- Sigebert Havercamp, Thesaurus Morelliantes (1734).
- Dictionary of Greek and Roman Biography and Mythology, William Smith, ed., Little, Brown and Company, Boston (1849), vol. I, pp. 615, 616 ("Carrinas or Carinas", No. 2).
