= Albia gens =

Ancient Roman family

The gens Albia was a minor plebeian family at Rome. They were of senatorial rank during the latter part of the Republic, but the only of this gens who obtained the consulship was Lucius Albius Pullaienus Pollio, in AD 90. Other Albii are known from various parts of Italy.

== Origin ==
The nomen Albius is derived from the common Latin surname Albus, meaning "white". Chase classifies it among those gentilicia that either originated at Rome, or cannot be shown to have come from anywhere else. The Albii Oppianici mentioned by Cicero in his oration, Pro Cluentio, bore the unusual praenomen Statius, which was scarce at Rome except among slaves or freedmen. It was an Oscan name that seems to have been fairly common in central and southern Italy. This may indicate that at least part of the family was of Sabine or Samnite origin, and indeed the Albii Oppianici were residents of Larinum in Samnium, although the surname Oppianicus implies that they had some connection with the Oppian Hill at Rome.

== Praenomina ==
The few Albii known from historical sources mostly bear common praenomina, such as Publius, Lucius, or Gaius. The use of Statius by an apparently Roman or Romanized family of the Albii was unusual; but although the name was generally associated with the servile classes at Rome, its use among the general populace in Samnium would probably have been understood.

== Branches and cognomina ==
The senator Publius Albius, known from a decree of the Roman Senate dating to 129 BC, bore no surname; under the Republic many plebeian families had no hereditary cognomina. The surname Oppianicus, known from the family of Larinum, indicates that this family may previously have lived at Rome, presumably acquiring the cognomen from some association with the Oppian Hill; but their use of the praenomen Statius suggests that they were natives of Samnium. Pollio, borne by the consul of AD 90, was a common surname of Latin origin, and originally indicated a polisher.

The nomen Carrinas was long supposed to be a surname of the Albia gens, due to its unusual form. This connection was proposed by Sigebert Havercamp, in his Thesaurus Morelliantes. However, Carrinas does not appear together with Albius in any known inscriptions. It would therefore seem to be a separate gentilicium of Oscan or Umbrian origin; Chase notes that Umbrian nomina frequently end in -as.

== Members ==
This list includes abbreviated praenomina. For an explanation of this practice, see filiation.

- Publius Albius, father of the senator Publius Albius.
- Publius Albius P. f., a senator in 129 BC. He might be the same person as the quaestor of 120.
- Publius Albius, quaestor in 120 BC, serving under the praetor Quintus Mucius Scaevola in Asia.
- Statius Albius Oppianicus, a notorious poisoner, and the villain of Cicero's speech Pro Cluentio, in defense of Oppianicus' step-son, Aulus Cluentius Habitus, who had been accused of poisoning Oppianicus.
- Gaius Albius Oppianicus, brother of Statius, who according to Cicero poisoned Gaius and his wife, Auria.
- Statius Albius St. f. Oppianicus, accused his step-brother, Aulus Cluentius, of poisoning his father.
- Albia, wife of Quintus Terentius Culleo with whom she had a daughter named Terentia Albia. Terentia married Lucius Salvius Otho and had a son named Otho who became emperor in AD 69.
- Lucius Albius Pullaienus Pollio, consul suffectus in September and October of AD 90, and proconsul of Asia from 104 to 105.

== See also ==
- List of Roman gentes

== Bibliography ==
- Marcus Tullius Cicero, Epistulae ad Atticum, Pro Cluentio.
- Sigebert Havercamp, Thesaurus Morelliantes (1734).
- Dictionary of Greek and Roman Biography and Mythology, William Smith, ed., Little, Brown and Company, Boston (1849).
- George Davis Chase, "The Origin of Roman Praenomina", in Harvard Studies in Classical Philology, vol. VIII, pp. 103–184 (1897).
- T. Robert S. Broughton, The Magistrates of the Roman Republic, American Philological Association (1952–1986).
- Robert K. Sherk, "The Text of the Senatus Consultum De Agro Pergameno", in Greek, Roman, and Byzantine Studies, vol. 7, pp. 361–369 (1966).
- Paul A. Gallivan, "The Fasti for A.D. 70–96", in Classical Quarterly, vol. 31, pp. 186–220 (1981).
- Werner Eck, "Jahres- und Provinzialfasten der senatorischen Statthalter von 69/70 bis 138/139" (Annual and Provincial Fasti of the Senatorial Governors from AD 69/70 to 138/139), in Chiron, vol. 12 (1982).
