= Gaius Fabius Hadrianus =

Roman senator and governor of Africa

Gaius Fabius Hadrianus was praetor in 84 BC and governor of the Roman province of Africa in 83–82. He is known primarily for the sensational circumstances of his death: during an uprising, the governor's residence was set on fire and Hadrianus was burned alive.

== A controversial career ==
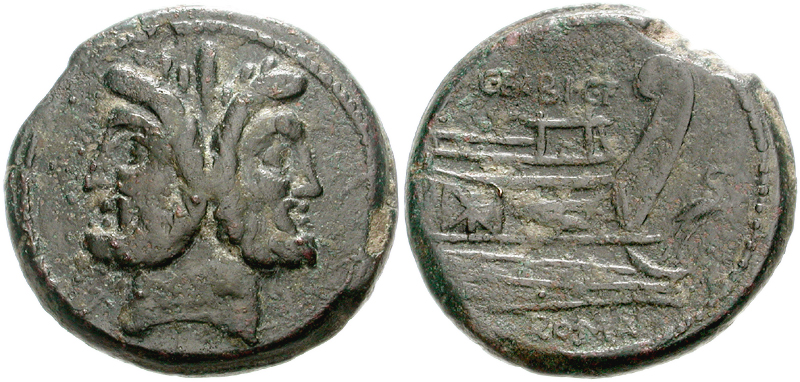
Coin issued by C. Fabius Hadrianus in 102 BC, depicting the god Janus and the prow of a galley (Classical Numismatics Group)

Next to nothing is known of the early career of Hadrianus. He has been identified with the C. Fabius Hadrianus who was a moneyer (monetalis) in 102 BC; several examples of his coins are known.

Following his praetorship in 84, Hadrianus forced out Metellus Pius, his predecessor as governor of Africa and a partisan of Sulla. An alternative view is that Metellus did not hold a legitimate governorship, but was attempting to seize power in Africa in 84 when Hadrianus held a duly appointed office. Since Hadrianus began his term during the last consulship of Cornelius Cinna, he is usually considered in league with the populares. His governorship would have redirected tribute from Africa to the cause of Cinna and the Marians.

Metellus fled to Numidia and the protection of Hiempsal II. Hadrianus allied with Hiarbas, a rival for the Numidian kingship, and succeeded in temporarily ousting Hiempsal, who hid out with Metellus and his men in Mauretania under the protection of Bocchus I. The actions of Hadrianus incurred the enmity of the pro-Sullan upper classes in Africa. During an uprising in Utica (in modern-day Tunisia), he was killed when the official residence was set on fire. The sources uniformly emphasize that he was burned alive.

== Politics and character ==
Hadrianus's tenure was remembered for greed and harshness. A.N. Sherwin-White called him "beastly." A chronological examination of the sources indicates that Cicero’s characterization of Hadrianus likely colored the view of historians who came later. In the course of his prosecution of Verres, Cicero makes a threatening comparison to Hadrianus and the manner of his death, saying that the defendant was even worse:

So you see, this man is by far guiltier and more worthless, even though he has been somewhat luckier than Hadrianus. Yes, that Hadrianus: because Roman citizens could not tolerate his greed, he was burned alive in his own house at Utica. What happened to him was considered so well-deserved that everybody was happy about it and no official inquiry was conducted.

Cicero uses the word domus, “house,” which directs attention away from Hadrianus's status as a promagistrate; Livy calls it properly the praetorium, the official residence of the governor. The 1st-century AD historian Valerius Maximus echoes Cicero's account closely: “After Hadrianus antagonized the Roman citizens settled at Utica with his sleazy governance and consequently was burned alive by them, no inquest was held at Rome to investigate the matter, nor did anyone bother to file a complaint.”

Although Hadrianus is sometimes said to have been "fluctuating between the parties of Cinna and Sulla", it is unclear what facts indicate support of Sulla. As both Cicero and Valerius Maximus note, the Sullan regime established that same year took no action in the matter, even though the legitimate governor of a major province had been killed. Both sources state that the violence in Utica was instigated not by Africans rebelling against Rome, but by Roman citizens (cives). At first glance, Orosius seems to contradict both Cicero and Valerius, claiming that Hadrianus was burned alive with his entire household because he had fomented rebellion among the slaves of Africa, whose masters apparently reacted with firewood and homicidal arson. The populares were often accused by the conservative elite, factually or not, of resorting to slaves to apply violence, and the killing might best be viewed in the context of the Sullan proscriptions of 82.

Even if Hadrianus was not among those proscribed, his death as a Cinnan holdover was timely. He was succeeded as governor of Africa by the most famous of Sulla's henchmen and supporters, Pompeius Magnus; at age 24, Pompey had not held the offices prerequisite to a governorship, but having declared the primacy of sword over law, he defeated the Marians, a contingent of whom were still occupying Africa, along with their Numidian allies. Pompey remained in Africa till 79, when he claimed his controversial first triumph for his victories there.
