= Busiris =

Busiris or Bousiris (Greek: Βούσιρις) may mean refer to:

== Places ==
- Abusir Bana ("Busiris of Lower Egypt"), a large ancient city, capital of its nome, and now a Catholic titular see
- Abusir ("Busiris of Middle Egypt"), part of the Memphite Necropolis
- Busiris (Aphroditopolis), an ancient city of Middle Egypt southwest of Aphroditopolis
- Taposiris Magna ("Abusir" or "Busiris"), a port city in Lower Egypt from the Ptolemaic Kingdom
- Abusir el-Meleq, a town and archaeological site, located near Beni Suef, Middle Egypt
- Busiris in the Thebaid, in Upper Egypt

== Mythology ==
- Busiris (mythology), name of two personages

== Arts ==
- Busiris, a declamation by Isocrates referring to the above Egyptian king
- Busiris, King of Egypt, a stage tragedy of 1719 by Edward Young

== Ships ==
- Busiris (ship) - one of several ships by that name

== See also ==
- Busiri (disambiguation)
