= Battle of Faventia (82 BC) =

Optimate victory in Sulla's Second Civil War

- Part of Sulla's Second Civil War
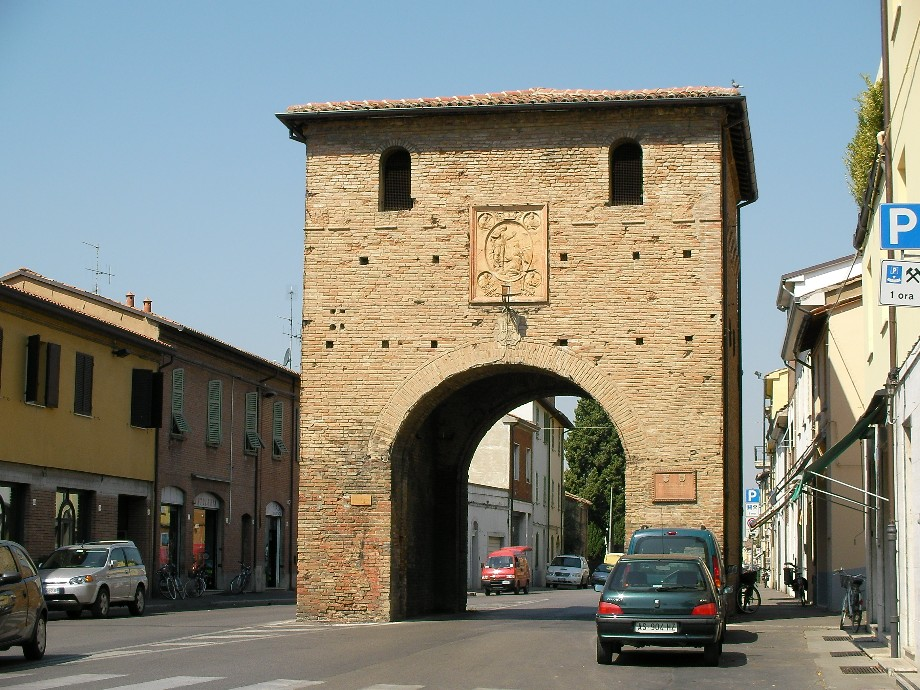
- Roman era gate at Faventia.
Date	September, 82 BC
Location	Faenza, Roman Republic
Result	Optimate victory

Belligerents
Optimates	Populares

Commanders and leaders
Quintus Caecilius Metellus Pius	Gaius Norbanus Balbus

Strength
20,000 Legionaries	25,000 Legionaries

Casualties and losses
Low	9,000–10,000 killed and 6,000 defected (all but 1,000 lost)

The Battle of Faventia took place in September of 82 BC at Faventia during the context of Sulla's Second Civil War. The battle pitted the Optimates under the command of Quintus Caecilius Metellus Pius against the Populares forces commanded by Gaius Norbanus Balbus. The battle resulted in an Optimate victory.

== Context ==
Through the course of the campaign of 82 BC, the Populares forces had divided into two groups, those in the north under the command of Gnaeus Papirius Carbo, and those in the south who were commanded by Gaius Marius the Younger. Sulla had successfully defeated Marius Battle of Sacriporto and had managed to pin Marius and his fellow survivors under a siege at Preneste. Rome itself soon after had fallen to the Optimates. Soon after, the war had shifted to Etruria where Sulla engaged in a pitched cavalry skirmish against Popular forces near the Glanis River, emerging victorious. His forces managed to defeat those of Gnaeus Papirius Carbo after expelling Carbo from Picenum.

== The battle ==
After expelling Carbo's forces from Picenum, Quintus Caecilius Metellus Pius camped at Faventia having decided to wait for the arrival of Gaius Norbanus Balbus who was marching with his army from Cisalpine Gaul. At the beginning of September, Norbanus Balbus arrived in the region and marched his forces towards Metellus' camp. No sooner had Norbanus Balbus arrived than he gave battle to Metellus' army. His soldiers were tired from their long march and were quickly routed. Norbanus Balbus' army retreated through a vineyard and many of his forces were slaughtered there as they ran. Those that escaped, Norbanus Balbus amongst them, directed themselves towards Ariminum.

== See also ==
- Lucius Cornelius Sulla Felix
