= Giovanni Battista Busiri =

Italian painter

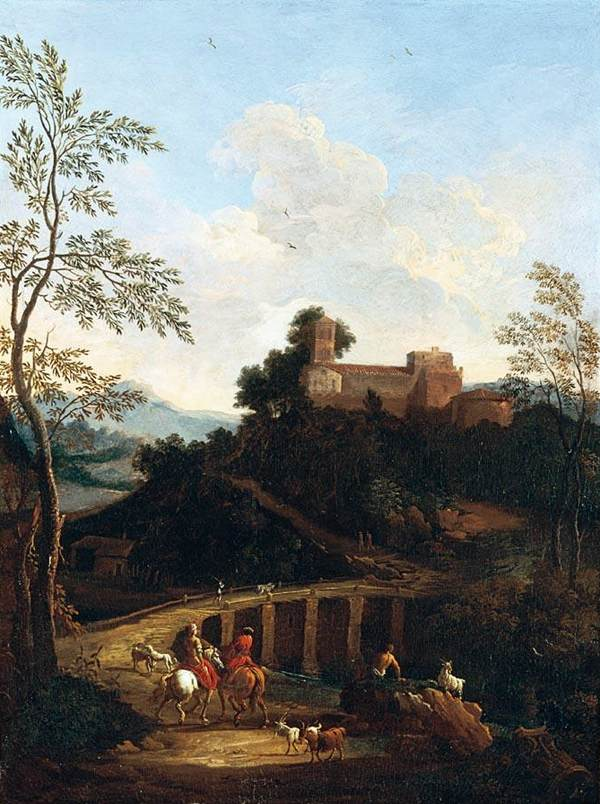
Roman landscape near a bridge

Giovanni Battista Busiri or Bussini (Rome, 1698 – 28 August 1757) was an Italian painter, mainly of landscapes and vedute.

== Biography ==
He followed the style of Gaspard Poussin. He was influenced by Jan Frans van Bloemen, Hendrik Frans van Lint, Andrea Locatelli, and Nicolas Poussin.

== Notes ==
- Giovanni Battista Busiri: Vedutista Romano Del '700 by Andrea Busiri Vici, Bozzi, 1966.
- Uvedale Price (1747-1829): Decoding the Picturesque, by C. Watkins, Ben Cowell, 2012.
