= Busiris (ship) =

Several ships have been named Busiris for the mythological figure of Busiris:

- Busiris (1814 ship) was launched at Newcastle-upon-Tyne in 1814 as a West Indiaman. She made one voyage as an East Indiaman and then returned to the West Indies trade. She was wrecked in May 1826.
- Busiris (1904 ship) was a steamer of 1,250 grt, launched at Sunderland. The German submarine SM U-39 sank her on 9 December 1915.
- Busiris (1929 ship) was a steam ship of 943 grt, built at Troon for the P&O company. During her service in WWII she survived a bombing in 1941. She was sold in 1958 and new owners renamed her Kyleglen. She was broken up at Dublin in 1958.
- Busiris (1960 ship) was a tanker of 22,980 grt, launched at Sunderland for the Moss Hutchinson Line. She was broken up in 1976.
