= Second Battle of Clusium =

The Second Battle of Clusium took place during Sulla's Second Civil War. Forces under the future triumvir Pompey defeated a 30,000 strong force under Carrinas, Brutus Damasippus and Marcius Censorinus, killing 20,000 of them. After the battle the defeated army largely dissolved, with many soldiers going home. All three defeated commanders escaped and took their remaining forces to the Samnites, who had declared for them.
