= Siwart Haverkamp =

Dutch classicist

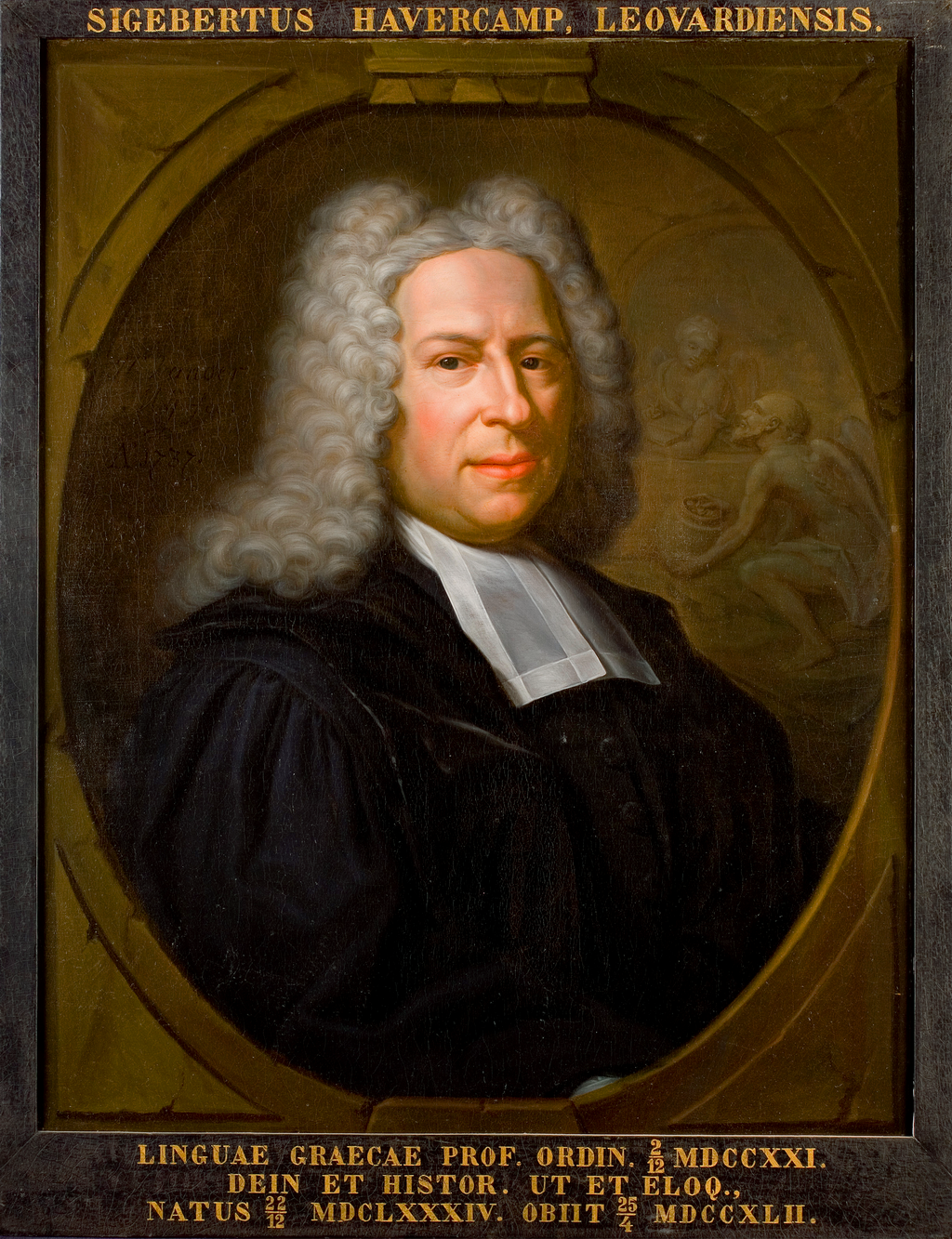
Sigebertus Havercamp

Sigebertus or Sijvert Evert "Siwart" Haverkamp (14 December 1684, Leeuwarden - 25 April 1742, Leiden) was a Dutch classicist. He published a translation of the complete works of Josephus, an edition of which was owned by Thomas Jefferson.
