= Gaius Marcius Censorinus (Marian) =

Roman politician and soldier (died 82 BC)

Gaius Marcius Censorinus (died 3 November, 82 BC) was a late Roman Republican politician and soldier who participated in the first civil war of the Roman Republic, against Sulla.

== Family History ==
Marcius Censorinus was a member of the plebeian Marcia gens of ancient Rome. The cognomen Censorinus was acquired through Gaius Marcius Rutilus, the first plebeian censor, whose son used it. The gens Marcia claimed descent from both Ancus Marcius, a King of Rome, and symbolically from Marsyas the satyr.

== Biography ==
Gaius Marcius Censorinus is first mentioned in historical chronicles after the return of Lucius Cornelius Sulla from Asia. After his return, Marcius Censorius accused him of trying to become a king and of receiving bribes from kings in the Asian provinces. Regardless, on the day of the trial, Marcius Censorius failed to show up and later withdrew his accusation.

With the outbreak of the First Civil War of the Roman Republic, Marcius Censorius joined the ranks of Gaius Marius and Lucius Cornelius Cinna in their efforts to combat Sulla. After the taking of Rome in 87 BC, Marcius Censorius took part in the massacre of Sullan sympathisers in the capital. When Gnaeus Octavius (Consul in 87 BC) was added to the prescribed lists, it was Marcius Censorinus who executed him and took his head to Cinna. The head was displayed in the Roman forum for some time.

In 83 BC, Sulla returned to Italy with his army and began fighting the Populares forces there. Due to the deaths of both Gaius Marius and Lucius Cornelius Cinna, the Populares were commanded by Gnaeus Papirius Carbo and Gaius Marius the Younger. In mid 82 BC, Marcius Censorius was sent to fight Pompey Magnus and was defeated at Sena Galica with Papirius Carbo.

As Marius the younger was besieged at Preneste, his food supply became increasingly scarce. Censorinus was sent by Carbo to his aid at the head of eight legions. Censorinus was ambushed en route by Gnaeus Pompeius Magnus and was once again routed. The survivors found refuge on a hill, blaming the ambush on Censorinus. One of the legions marched off without orders to Ariminium, while the rest deserted outright. Censorinus was forced to return to Carbo's camp accompanied by only a few soldiers.

In September, Carbo, disheartened by so many defeats, retreated to Sicily. Censorinus, together with Gaius Carrinas and Lucius Junius Brutus Damasipus took command of the remaining legions at Clusium. Pompeius attacked them at the battle of Clusium, inflicting casualties of over twenty thousand killed on the Populares army. After this decisive defeat, Censorinus and the Populares army retreated to the Sebellian region where the Samnites had enlisted a thousand soldiers to free Marius the Younger from his siege. Nevertheless, Sulla cut their path to Preneste and halted their advance. After this, Telesinus decided to march on Rome with the goal of sacking the city, but not to capture it. Sulla marched after Telesinus and on 1 November, 82 BC, the two armies met at the Battle of the Colline Gate at the gates of the city. With the help of Marcus Licinius Crassus, Sulla's forces annihilated the enemy.

== Death ==
Gaius Marcius Censorinus, along with many of his comrades, was captured during the Battle of the Colline Gate. He was beheaded at Sulla's orders and his head was sent to Preneste to lower the morale of the troops under the command of Gaius Marius the Younger. The effect was instantaneous as most of Marius' army deserted immediately.
