= Quintus Caecilius Metellus Pius =

Roman politician and general, Pontifex Maximus, consul in 80 BCE

- Born: c. 128 BC
- Died: 63 BC (aged c. 65)
- Occupations: Politician and military leader
- Office: Praetor (89 BC); Pontifex maximus (81–63 BC); Consul (80 BC); Proconsul (against Sertorius) (79–71 BC)
- Relatives: Metellus Numidicus (father); Metellus Scipio (adopted son)

Military service
- Years of service: 109–72 BC
- Battles/wars: Jugurthine War; Social War; Bellum Octavianum; Sulla's civil war; Battle at the Aesis River; Sertorian War; Battle of Italica; Battle of Saguntum
- Awards: Roman triumph

Quintus Caecilius Metellus Pius (c. 128 – 63 BC) was a general and statesman of the Roman Republic. His father Metellus Numidicus was banished from Rome through the machinations of Gaius Marius. Because of his constant and unbending attempts to have his father officially recalled from exile, he was given the agnomen (nickname) Pius.

During the civil wars between 88 and 80 BC, Pius sided with Lucius Cornelius Sulla. He successfully commanded Sulla's forces in the northern theatre (northern Italy and Cisalpine Gaul). In 81 BC he became pontifex maximus, then consul the following year alongside Sulla. As proconsul Pius fought against Sertorius (a former supporter of Marius) on the Iberian peninsula; in the so-called Sertorian War. He served alongside Pompey slowly grinding down the rebels from 79 to 72/71 BC. For his victories during the Sertorian War he was granted a triumph.

== Early career ==
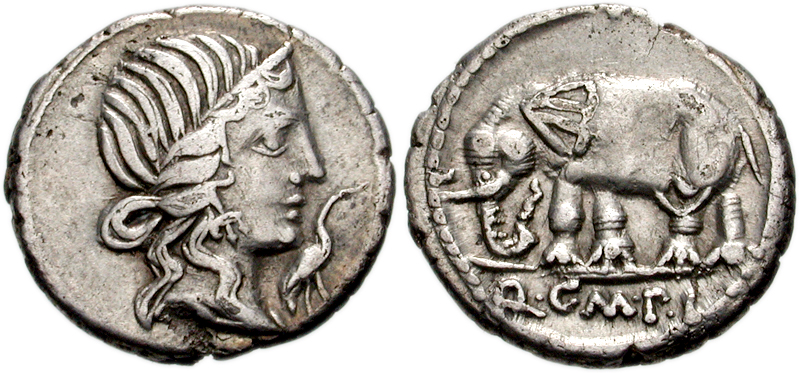
Coin of Quintus Caecilius Metellus Pius

Metellus Pius, a member of the distinguished plebeian gens Caecilia, was the son of Quintus Caecilius Metellus Numidicus, who was consul in 109 BC. His career began in that same year, when he accompanied his father to Numidia as his contubernalis (cadet) during the Jugurthine War, returning to Rome in 107 BC, when the actions of Gaius Marius forcibly recalled his father. In 100 BC, after his father was banished due to the political maneuverings of Gaius Marius and Lucius Appuleius Saturninus, Metellus Pius launched a campaign to bring his father back from exile. He produced a petition in 99 BC to this effect, and his constant pleading on the subject resulted in Quintus Calidius, the plebeian tribune of 98 BC passing a law which allowed his father to return. As a result of his fidelity, he was given the agnomen "Pius" for the constancy and inflexibility with which he fought for his father's political rehabilitation and return to Rome.

Sometime during the 90s BC, Metellus Pius was elected to the College of Pontiffs as a result of his family's eminence and influence. The outbreak of the Social War saw him employed as a legate in late 89 BC, probably serving the consul Pompeius Strabo in the northern theatre; he won some battles against the Marsi. As a result of these victories, he was elected praetor in the following year (88 BC). During his praetorship, he was tasked with enrolling the Italian allies as new Roman citizens within sixty days, in accordance with the lex Plautia Papiria. Once this was completed, Metellus Pius returned to the front, and replaced the legate Gaius Cosconius on the southern front. He harassed the territory around Apulia, captured the town of Venusia, and defeated the rebel leader, Quintus Poppaedius Silo, who died during the storming of Venusia. Cicero, at the time a young man, remembered hearing Metellus speak at contiones in Rome during this period, most likely during Metellus' praetorship. Cicero remarked of Metellus' ability: 'although no real orator, he was nonetheless not without some capacity for public speech'.

In 88 BC, after being sidelined by his political opponents, Sulla marched his legions on Rome and took the capital. He took revenge on his enemies and forced Marius into exile. Sulla then left Italy and went east to fight in the First Mithridatic War against Mithridates VI of Pontus. In 87 BC, Metellus Pius' command was extended, with his appointment as propraetor, responsible for continuing the war against Samnium. Later that year, however, saw a dispute between the two consuls Lucius Cornelius Cinna and Gnaeus Octavius flare up into war. Cinna, expelled from Rome, met up with the exiled Gaius Marius, and with their ally Quintus Sertorius they marched on Rome and laid siege to the city. During the early phase of this conflict, the Senate, fearing that they may need additional troops and commanders, ordered Metellus Pius to negotiate a peace with the Samnites.

Marching to Rome, he made camp at the Alban Hills, accompanied by Publius Licinius Crassus. Here he met up with Gnaeus Octavius, who had abandoned Rome, but both men soon fell out with each other, over Metellus Pius' troops demanding that their commander take over overall command from Gnaeus Octavius. The Senate then asked him to negotiate with Cinna on their behalf, during which time he recognized Cinna as the legitimate consul. However, with Cinna's occupation of Rome and the executions initiated by Gaius Marius, Metellus Pius decided to abandon Rome and head to North Africa.

== Supporter of Sulla ==
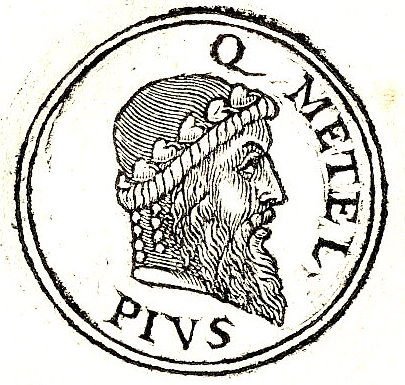
Fantasy portrait of Metellus Pius from Guillaume Rouillé's Promptuarii Iconum Insigniorum

Arriving in Africa by early 86 BC, Metellus Pius started raising an army from his clients, with the intent of joining Lucius Cornelius Sulla, the principal opponent of Cinna and Marius. He was joined by Marcus Licinius Crassus, but both men fell out, and Crassus was forced to leave and eventually join up with Sulla in Greece. Metellus acted as propraetorian governor of the province, but this was unrecognized by Cinna and his regime at Rome. Nevertheless, it wasn't until 84 BC that the Marians at Rome were able to send out their own governor, Gaius Fabius Hadrianus. Upon his arrival, he drove out Metellus who fled to Numidia; pursued here, he and the Numidian king Hiempsal II were forced to flee onwards to Mauretania. From here, Metellus made his way to Liguria (in North-Western Italy) by late 84 BC or early 83 BC.

By 83 BC, Sulla had returned from the east and was slowly marching towards Rome for his confrontation with the Marian regime. Moving quickly, Metellus was the first to meet him along the Via Appia, bringing new troops with him. He, like many of the aristocracy, only joined Sulla when it was prudent to do so, and not because they approved of his measures, such as his first march on Rome. Regardless, recognizing Metellus as possessing propraetorian imperium and his influence as a member of the powerful Metellan faction, Sulla made him his principal subordinate. By July 83 BC, the Senate, under the direction of the consul Gnaeus Papirius Carbo, declared Metellus a public enemy.

In 82 BC, Sulla sent him to secure the northern parts of Italy, he was accompanied by a young Pompey Magnus, Marcus Crassus and Marcus Lucullus. Metellus defeated Carbo's lieutenant, the praetor Gaius Carrinas, in a six-hour battle at the river Aesis, only to be blockaded by Carbo himself. When word of Sulla's victory at the Battle of Sacriportus reached them, Carbo retreated to his base at Ariminium, severely harassed by Pompey who acted as Metellus's cavalry commander. Some time later Metellus defeated Gaius Marcius Censorinus, another one of Carbo's lieutenants, Pompey's cavalry caught Censorinus's fleeing troops outside their base at Sena Gallica, defeating them and plundering the town. Metellus then achieved a victory over the consul Carbo and his general Gaius Norbanus at Faventia, pacifying Cisalpine Gaul for Sulla. With Sulla's victory in 82 BC, he began rewarding his supporters, and made Metellus the Pontifex Maximus in 81 BC, following the murder of Quintus Mucius Scaevola Pontifex. He was also a Monetalis from 82 BC to 80 BC.

During this entire period, he was shown to be one of Sulla's best subordinates. Finally in 80 BC, he was appointed consul alongside Sulla. Metellus Pius used his position to reward Quintus Calidius, who had helped bring his father back, by supporting his bid for the praetorship.

== Sertorian War ==
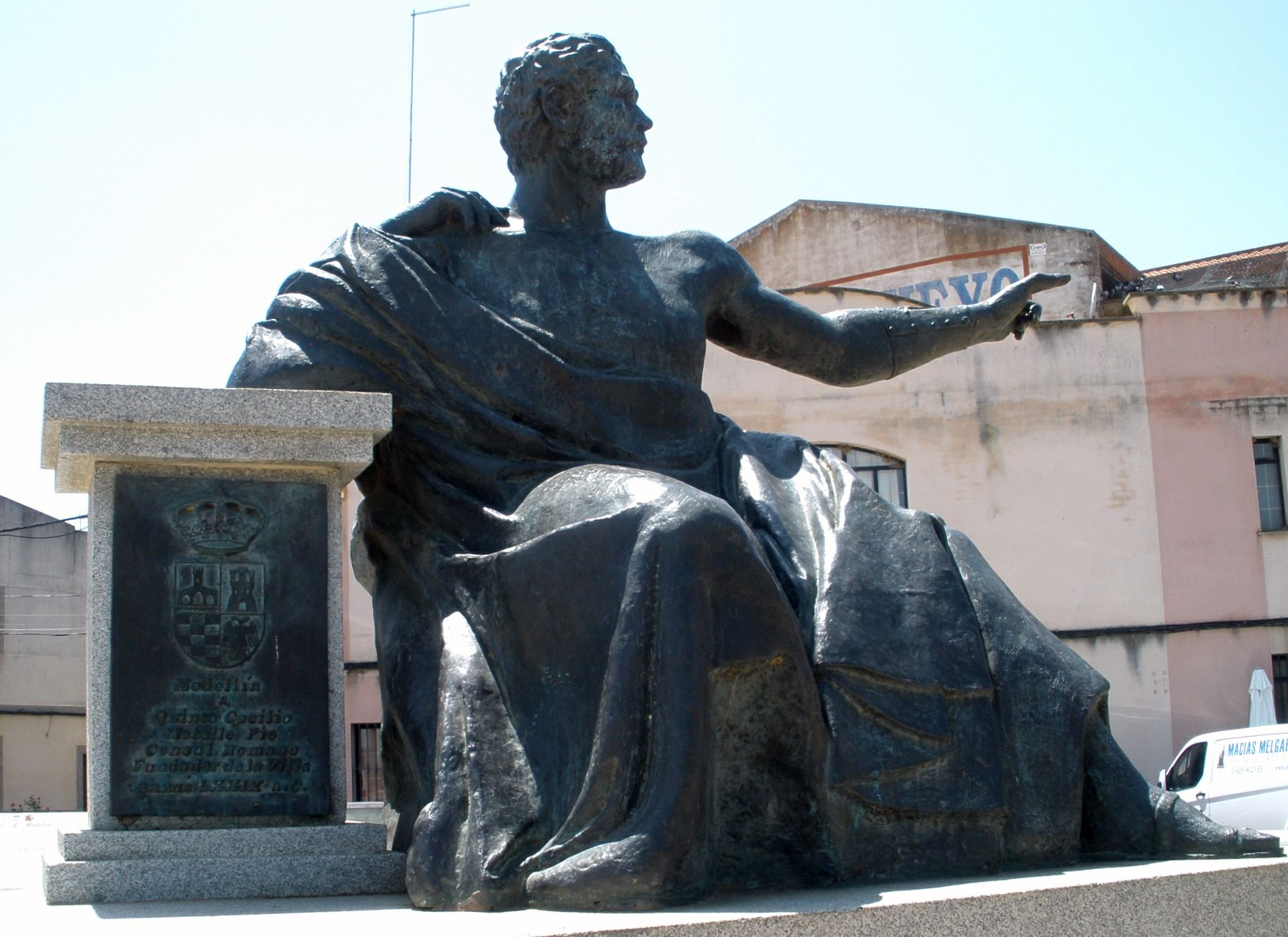
Monument Quintus Caecilius Metellus Pius in Medellín, Spain

Sometime during his consulship, Quintus Sertorius, an opponent of Sulla, established himself in Hispania and began a rebellion against the Senate. In 80 BC, after Sertorius had defeated Lucius Fufidius, the governor of Hispania Ulterior, the Senate decided to send Metellus once his term as consul had ended. Upgrading Hispania Ulterior to a consular province, they dispatched Metellus to take charge of the war against Sertorius. Arriving in Hispania in 79 BC Metellus established his bases at Metellinum (today Medellín), Castra Caecilia (today Cáceres), Viccus Caecilius, at the Sierra de Gredos, and at Caeciliana, near Setúbal.

Metellus suffered repeated defeats from Sertorius’ use of guerrilla tactics. His legate Thorius (probably Lucius Thorius Balbus) − dispatched to come to the assistance of the governor of Hispania Citerior, Marcus Domitius Calvinus − was defeated by Sertorius (79 BC). After Thorius's defeat Metellus decided to take on Sertorius himself. Metellus was a solid if unspectacular general, under normal circumstances he would have easily trounced his opponent with his superior forces, but now he was pitted against the tactically brilliant Sertorius. Plutarch describes the unequal campaign which followed:

He [Metellus] was accustomed to regular warfare with heavy infantry. He liked to command a solid, ponderous bloc of infantry. This formation was superbly trained to push back and vanquish the enemy in close quarter combat. For constantly chasing men who floated like the wind over the mountains he had to climb for enduring – as their enemy did – constant hunger without either tent or campfire, his army was useless. The light armour and consequent agility of his Iberian warriors meant Sertorius was constantly shifting his focus and changing the situation, until Metellus was at his wits' end. Metellus was no longer young, and after the many heroic contests of his youth he was now somewhat inclined to ease and luxury, while Sertorius was full of mature vigour. ... When Sertorius challenged Metellus to single combat, Metellus' men cheered and urged him to fight it out, general to general, and they mocked him when he declined.

After an unsuccessful push towards the Tagus in 79 BC, and suffering a defeat by Sertorius at Lacobriga in 78 BC, Pius was forced to ask for help from Lucius Manlius, the governor of Gallia Transalpina, but Manlius was defeated by Sertorius's legate Lucius Hirtuleius upon entering the Iberian peninsula and had to retreat. The end result was that an exhausted Metellus was pushed out of his province (Hispania Ulterior). Metellus probably had a security problem. Sertorius was rumored to have many spies in his camp. On a later occasion a young officer asked Metellus the intention behind one of his order. He retorted: "If the shirt on my back knew what I have in mind, I would take it off and throw it into the fire."

When the consuls of 78 BC declined to join Metellus as proconsuls once their terms ended, the Senate in late 77 BC, hearing of Metellus' ongoing reverses at the hands of Sertorius, decided to send Gnaeus Pompeius Magnus with a large army to give Metellus what assistance he could, while Pius' governorship was prorogued. Both men worked well together, but were hard pressed to win any encounter with Sertorius himself. With Pompey's arrival in 76 BC, Sertorius turned his attention to him, inflicting severe losses on the Pompeian army at the Battle of Lauron. Unfortunately for Sertorius, his legates were not able to contain Metellus, and he arrived just in time to save Pompey. Against Sertorius's legates Metellus and Pompey had more success. In 75 BC, Pompey defeated Sertorius's legates Marcus Perperna and Gaius Herennius at the Battle of Valentia while Metellus defeated Hirtuleius at the Battle of Italica.

=== Italica ===
The battle was Metellus' first major victory in the Sertorian War. It freed Metellus' army from the western theatre and allowed him to march against Sertorius' rear in the eastern theatre.

Metellus and Hirtuleius were campaigning near the Roman colony of Italica when Hirtuleius made the mistake of trying to force his opponent into a pitched battle. He mustered his army soon after dawn and marched on Metellus' encampment. Metellus mustered his troops too, but kept them behind his entrenchments until noon. It was extremely hot and Hirtuleius' troops were soon sweltering while Metellus' legionaries remained relatively fresh. Since his enemy remained drawn up in front of his camp for hours, Metellus had plenty of time to study their dispositions and make his own plans accordingly. He had observed that Hirtuleius had posted his strongest units in the centre of his battle-line.

When the battle finally commenced Metellus held back his own centre and concentrated on winning on the flanks. After defeating his opponent's flanks he enveloped Hirtuleius' centre and slaughtered them. This was the classic tactic used by Hannibal at Cannae almost a century and a half previous. Hirtuleius lost 20,000 men at Italica and fled north to join his commander Sertorius who was squaring off against Pompey.

=== Sucro and Saguntum ===
Metellus came to the aid of Pompey after his near defeat at Sucro. They then followed Sertorius inland to a town called Segontia and finally won a battle against Sertorius himself. Metellus was acclaimed imperator by his men.

Plutarch remarks that this battle was forced upon Sertorius. This was probably done by his Celt-Iberian troops who wanted to defend Segontia, one of their native towns. The fighting started at noon and lasted well into the night. Sertorius first fought Pompey while his legates Perpenna and Hirtuleius fought Metellus. After Hirtuleius had fallen Sertorius switched places with Perpenna and launched several personally-led attacks on Metellus. (Sertorius probably reckoned Metellus' army would break without its leader.) Metellus stood his ground and in the course of the fight he was wounded by a spear. This turned out to be a turning point in the battle, for Metellus' men counter-attacked in revenge and pushed back the Iberians.

All the Romans who saw or heard of this [Metellus being wounded] were filled with shame at the idea of deserting their commander. The same event filled them with fury against the enemy. So, they covered Metellus with their shields and carried him out of danger. Then they fell energetically on the Iberians and pushed them back. Victory changed sides.Plutarch

Metellus then complacently decided to rest his troops and made camp. Sertorius in the meantime had regrouped his men and in the evening launched an unexpected attack on Metellus' camp, and attempted to exploit its vulnerable position by cutting it off with a trench. Unfortunately for the Sertorians, Pompey and his army now showed up and forced them to withdraw. Over the course of the battle Pompey had lost 6,000 men while Sertorius had lost only 3,000, but to offset this Perperna had lost some 5,000 soldiers. Metellus' losses are unknown, but must have been significant as well.

=== The final years ===
Metellus Pius spent the winter of 75–74 BC in Gaul, where he received two legions in reinforcements. Upon his return to Hispania in 74 BC, he captured the towns of Bilbilis and Segobriga, before joining Pompey at the siege of Calagurris. They were forced to raise the siege when Sertorius approached, after which Pius returned to Gaul. He then offered a reward of 100 silver talents and 20,000 acres of land to any Roman who would betray Sertorius. This resulted in Sertorius no longer trusting his Roman bodyguard and exchanged it for an Iberian one. Continued successes during 73 BC saw him ease up and allow Pompey to take the burden of the final phases of the war, with Sertorius' murder in 72 BC. He imposed new taxes in Hispania Ulterior after the end of Sertorius' rebellion. Pius' governorship ended in 71 BC with the end of the war. He disbanded his army after crossing the Alps, and celebrated a triumph together with Pompey on December 30, 71 BC. Regardless of the triumph, during those eight years of resistance he was unable to conclusively defeat Sertorius, and it was only after Sertorius' assassination by his own men that the rebels were forced to cede to the military ability of Metellus Pius.

== Later career ==
Regardless of his working relationship with Pompey in Hispania, Metellus Pius' politics meant that he was opposed to Pompey's continued irregular extra-magisterial career throughout the 60s BC. Though Pompey was largely untouchable, senatorial resentment could be visited upon his clients and (former) subordinates. When the former plebeian tribune and associate of Pompey, Gaius Cornelius, was accused of maiestas, the prosecution called on as witnesses a number of key anti-Pompeian former consuls, including Metellus Pius.

Metellus Pius was a friend and patron of the noted poet Aulus Licinius Archias. Pius died around 63 BC; that year, Julius Caesar succeeded him as pontifex maximus.

== Family relations ==
Quintus Caecilius had no natural children. Therefore by his will he adopted a member of the patrician family Cornelia, son of Publius Cornelius Scipio Nasica, and maternal grandson of Lucius Licinius Crassus, great-grandson of Quintus Mucius Scaevola Augur and great-great-grandson of Gaius Laelius Sapiens. On the paternal side this nobleman was the great grandson of Metellus Macedonicus and thus was a third cousin of his adoptive father. At the time of his adoption the new Caecilius was a grown man, but he had not yet shown himself in any way. He received name Quintus Caecilius Metellus Pius Scipio Nasica and further became the consul of 52 BC and father-in-law of Gnaeus Pompey the Great.

== In fiction ==
Metellus Pius is a prominent character in the novels The First Man in Rome, The Grass Crown and Fortune's Favorites by Colleen McCullough. In the novels he is characterised as having a stutter, and is referred to by contemporaries, including Sulla, as "the Piglet".

He is also mentioned in John Maddox Roberts' SPQR series as the fictional main character Decius Caecilius Metellus' uncle.

== Bibliography ==
- Badian, Ernst (2012). "Caecilius Metellus Pius, Quintus". Oxford Classical Dictionary (4th ed.). Oxford University Press. doi:10.1093/acrefore/9780199381135.013.1229. ISBN 978-0-19-938113-5 – via Oxford Research Encyclopedias.
- Brennan, T Corey (2000). The praetorship in the Roman republic. Vol. 2.
- Broughton, T R S (1952). Magistrates of the Roman republic. Vol. 2. New York: American Philological Association.
- Broughton, T R S (1986). Magistrates of the Roman republic. Vol. 3.
- Gruen, Erich (1995). The last generation of the Roman republic. Berkeley: University of California Press. ISBN 0-520-02238-6.
- Konrad, C F (1994). Plutarch's Sertorius: a historical commentary. Chapel Hill, NC: University of North Carolina Press. ISBN 0-8078-2139-X.
- Leach, John (1978). Pompey the Great. Biddle. ISBN 0-8476-6035-4.
- Lovano, Michael (2002). The age of Cinna: crucible of late republican Rome. Stuttgart: Franz Steiner Verlag. ISBN 978-3-515-07948-8.
- Matyszak, Philip (2013). Sertorius and the struggle of Spain. Barnsley, England: Pen and Sword. ISBN 978-1-84884-787-3.
- Münzer, Friedrich (1897). "Caecilius 98" . Realencyclopädie der classischen Altertumswissenschaft (in German). Vol. III, 1. Stuttgart: Butcher. cols. 1221–24 – via Wikisource.
- Smith, William, ed. (1867). Dictionary of Greek and Roman biography and mythology. Vol. 2.
- Zmeskal, Klaus (2009). Adfinitas (in German). Vol. 1. Passau: Verlag Karl Stutz. ISBN 978-3-88849-304-1.

Political offices
Preceded by M. Tullius Decula; Gn. Cornelius Dolabella	Roman consul 80 BC; With: L. Cornelius Sulla Felix	Succeeded by P. Servilius Vatia; Ap. Claudius Pulcher
Religious titles
Preceded by Q. Mucius Scaevola	Pontifex maximus 81–63 BC	Succeeded by Julius Caesar
