= Gaius Carrinas (praetor 82 BC) =

Roman general

Personal details
- Died: 1 November 82 BC Outside Rome
- Children: Gaius Carrinas (consul)
- Occupation: Military commander

Military service
- Allegiance: Marius and Carbo
- Years of service: 83–82 BC
- Rank: Praetor
- Battles/wars: Sulla's civil war

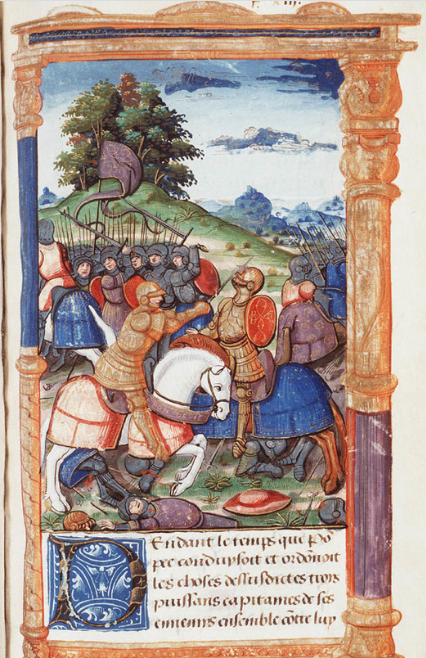
Three generals, Carinas, Cloelius and Brutus

Gaius Carrinas (died November 82 BC) was a Roman general and statesman. He was one of the leading opponents of Sulla during the civil war of 83–82 BC, and suffered several defeats on the field against Sulla's lieutenants. He was executed following the Battle of the Colline Gate in November 82 BC.

== Biography ==
The name 'Carrinas' is of Etruscan or Umbrian origin. T. P. Wiseman suggests that Gaius Carrinas was a homo novus, the first of his family to enter the Roman Senate, and that he received Roman citizenship as result of the Social War (91–87 BC). Other historians have pointed out that Carrinas's voting tribe (probably the 'Quirina', perhaps the 'Collina') was not common to Etruria, and so he may have already been a citizen by that time.

In 83 BC, when civil war erupted between the Roman government and the outlawed general Sulla, Carrinas was one of three commanders whom the young Pompey (the future "triumvir") routed while on his way to join his army with Sulla's. In the following year, Carrinas became a praetor and served as one of the consul Papirius Carbo's subordinate commanders, commanding one legion. He suffered defeats at the Aesis river in Umbria by Metellus Pius and at Spoletium by Pompey and Crassus. Despite finding himself besieged at that town, Carrinas succeeded in escaping with his troops during a stormy night.

After the consul Carbo had fled Italy, Carrinas joined his troops with those of the other remaining government generals on the field, Censorinus and Damasippus, as well as the anti-Sullan Samnites. Their combined forces tried unsuccessfully to break through the enemy lines at Praeneste, where the other consul, Marius, was besieged. They then marched to Rome, which Sulla had previously taken, but suffered a final crushing defeat at the Battle of the Colline Gate. Carrinas was caught in flight and executed, and his head was among those which were paraded before the besieged Marian remnants at Praeneste.

Carrinas had a son, also called Gaius Carrinas, who, owing to his father's opposition to Sulla, was legally barred from public life, but later rose to prominence in service to Julius Caesar and the Second Triumvirate.
