= Optimates and populares =

Political labels in the Roman Republic

Optimates (/ˌɒptɪˈmeɪtiːz/, /ˈɒptɪmeɪts/; Latin for "best ones"; sing. optimas) and populares (/ˌpɒpjʊˈlɛəriːz, -jə-, -ˈleɪriːz/; Latin for "supporters of the people"; sing. popularis) are labels applied to politicians, political groups, traditions, strategies, or ideologies in the late Roman Republic. It is debated as to whether Romans would have recognised an ideological content or political split in the label.

Among other things, optimates have been seen as supporters of the continued authority of the senate, politicians who operated mostly in the senate, or opponents of the populares. The populares have also been seen as focusing on operating before the popular assemblies, generally in opposition to the senate, using "the populace, rather than the senate, as a means [for advantage]". References to optimates (also called boni, "good men") and populares are found among the writings of Roman authors of the 1st century BC. The distinction between the terms is most clearly established in Cicero's Pro Sestio, a speech given and published in 56 BC, where he framed the two labels against each other.

With the publication of the Römische Geschichte in the 1850s, the German historian Theodor Mommsen set the enduring and popular interpretation that optimates and populares represented political parties, which he implicitly compared to the German liberal and conservative parties of his own day; however, Mommsen's paradigm has been criticised by generations of historians, first by Friedrich Münzer, followed by Ronald Syme, who considered that Roman politics was marked by familial and individual ambitions, not parties. Other historians have pointed to the impossibility of applying such labels to many individuals, who could pretend to be popularis or optimas as they saw fit; the careers of Drusus or Pompey are for example impossible to fit into one "party". Ancient usage was also far from clear, and even Cicero, while linking optimates to Greek aristokratia (ἀριστοκρατία), also used the word populares to describe politics "completely compatible with ... honourable aristocratic behaviour".

Modern historians do not recognise any "coherent political party" under either populares or optimates, and those labels do not lend themselves easily to comparison with a modern left–right political spectrum; however, democratic interpretations of Roman politics have pushed for a re-evaluation that attributes an ideological tendency – e.g. populares believing in popular sovereignty – to the labels.

== Meaning ==
With the publication of the Römische Geschichte in the 1850s, the German historian Theodor Mommsen set the enduring and popular interpretation that optimates and populares represented aristocratic and democratic parliamentary-style political parties, with the labels emerging around the time of the Gracchi. His interpretation "owe[d] much to nineteenth century German liberal thought". However, classicists generally agree that neither optimate or popularis referred to political parties: "It is common knowledge nowadays that populares did not constitute a coherent political group or 'party' (even less so than their counterparts, optimates)".

Unlike in modern times, Roman politicians stood for office on the basis of their personal reputations and qualities rather than with a party manifesto or platform. For example, the opposition to the First Triumvirate failed to act as a united front with coherent coordination of its members, acting instead on an ad hoc basis with regular defections to and from those opposing the political alliance depending on the topic of debate, personal relations, etc. These ad hoc alliances and many different methods of gaining political influence meant there were no "neat categories of optimates and populares" or of conservatives and radicals in a modern sense. Erich S Gruen, for example, in Last Generation of the Roman Republic (1974) rejected both populares and optimates, saying "such labels obscure rather than enlighten" and arguing that optimates was used not as a political label, but instead used to praise a member of the political elite. Moving away from the 19th century view of political parties or factions vying for dominance, the scope of the modern academic debate focuses on whether the terms referred to an ideological split among aristocrats or whether the terms were meaningless or topics of debate themselves.

=== Optimates ===
The traditional view of the optimates refers to aristocrats who defended their own material and political interests and behaved akin to modern fiscal conservatives in opposing wealth redistribution and supporting small government. (Note: Mouritsen also cautions against viewing the senators as fiscal conservatives: Romans were not directly taxed and the tax system in general had no redistributive effect. Questions of tax policy revolved not on how much Romans should pay, but on how much non-Roman provincials should pay.) To that end, the optimates were viewed traditionally as emphasising the authority or influence of the senate over other organs of the states, including the popular assemblies. In other instances, the optimates are defined "somewhat mechanically, as those who opposed the populares". This definition relying on a "senatorial" party or fiscal conservatives breaks down at a closer reading of the evidence. A "senatorial" party describes no meaningful split, as basically all active politicians were senators. (Note: After the Constitutional reforms of Sulla, anyone who had held the quaestorship (a relatively junior post) was enrolled into the senate automatically.)

A definition to the terms based on whether a politician supported land redistribution or grain subsidies runs into two issues. Such measures were not "the sole preserve of the so-called populares" and "were not per se incompatible with traditional senatorial policy, given the extensive colonisation the senate had overseen in the past and the grain provision which members of the elite occasionally organised on a private basis". Moreover, identifying the populares based on the policies they supported in office would place politicians traditionally identified as belonging to one "faction" into the "opposite" camp:

- Publius Sulpicius Rufus, one of the classic populares, supported policies that had little "to do with the betterment of the populus and in fact appear to have been distinctly unpopular".
- Marcus Livius Drusus, brought agrarian reform laws with the support of the senate, giving his policies a popularis tone, even when senatorial support and agrarian reforms are supposedly dichotomous.
- Cato the Younger, traditionally identified as the optimate, becomes popularis for supporting expansion of the grain dole during his tribunate.
- Sulla, traditionally identified also as an arch-conservative, turns popularis for "probably confiscat[ing] and redistribut[ing] more land in Italy than any other Roman politician".
- And Julius Caesar, traditionally seen as popularis (though never self-identifying with that label in his extant texts), emerges as an optimate for "substantially reduc[ing] the number of grain recipients in Rome during his dictatorship".

Other proposed views of optimates are that they were leaders of the senate or those acting with the support of the senate. Mouritsen in Politics in the Roman Republic (2017) rejects both of the traditional definitions. Of optimates being those with the support of the senate:

the category becomes devoid of any political content, since the majority would always be "optimates" whatever policy they happened to agree on. In other words, if we follow Meier's approach to its logical conclusion, the two concepts become virtually meaningless, as illustrated by the famous vote in December 50 when the senate rejected the hard-line "optimate" opponents of Caesar and endorsed Curio's compromise option by 370 to 22. On that occasion the leading "optimates" did not have the rest of the senate behind them, effectively turning men like Cato into "populares".

Usage of the term by contemporaries also was not highly dichotomised. Optimate was used generically to refer to the wealthy classes in Rome as well as the aristocracies of foreign cities or states:

As a standard term for the ruling class [optimates] was widely used, often in parallel with boni, which denoted the propertied classes in general and therefore overlapped with optimates. Its generic nature is illustrated by the fact that it could be employed about foreign aristocracies... If we accept this definition of optimates as a term denoting the senatorial elite, the so-called populares – qua senators – themselves become optimates, precluding any meaningful distinction.

=== Populares ===
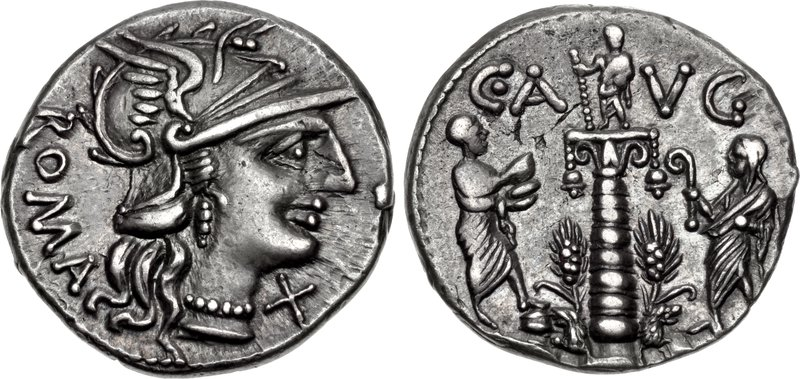
Denarius of Gaius Minucius Augurinus, 135 BC, depicting a grain distribution. Grain distribution is traditionally held to be one of the recurrent topics of popularis agitation.

References to populares in scholarship today "do not imply a co-ordinated 'party' with a distinctive ideological character, a kind of political grouping for which there is no evidence in Rome, but simply allude to a... type of senator" who is "at least at that moment acting as the people's man". This is in contrast to the 19th century view of the populares from Mommsen, in which they are a group of aristocrats which supported democracy and the rights and material interests of the common people. The highly influential view of Christian Meier redefined the popularis as a label for a senator using the popular assemblies' law-making powers to overrule decisions of the senate, primarily as a political tactic to get ahead in Roman politics. In this view, a populares politician is a person who:

[adopts] a certain method of political working, to use the populace, rather than the senate, as a means to an end; the end being, most likely, personal advantage for the politician concerned.

==== Ratio popularis ====
The ratio popularis, or strategy of putting political questions before the people writ large, was pursued when politicians were unable to achieve their goals through the normal process in the senate. This was in part structural: the "dyadic nature of [the senate and people of Rome, ie the republic] meant that when a senator opposed his peers... there was only recourse available" to the people. This political method involved a populist style of rhetoric, and "only to a limited extent, that of policy" with even less ideological content.

The content of popularis legislation was tied to the fact that politicians choosing to go before the people required strong support therefrom to overrule the decision of the senate. This forced politicians choosing a popular strategy to include policies that directly benefited voters in the assemblies, such as debt relief, land redistribution, and grain doles. The earlier popularis tactics of Tiberius Gracchus reflected the dominance of rural voters who had resettled to Rome recently, while the later popularis tactics of Clodius reflected the interests of the masses of urban poor.

Material interests like corn subsidy bills were not the whole of popularis causes: popularis politicians also may have made arguments on the proper role of the Assemblies in the Roman state (ie, a popular sovereignty) rather than just questions of material interests. Other benefits proposed attempted to empower supporters in the popular assemblies, with introduction of secret ballot, restoration of tribunician rights after Sulla's dictatorship, promotion of non-senators onto juries before the law courts, and the general election of priests. All of these empowered non-senatorial supporters broadly, including both the wealthy equites and the poor urban population in Rome.

==== Ideological view ====
One of the larger issues in modern scholarship is whether the politicians who operated in the ratio popularis actually believed in their proposals, scepticism of which "certainly seems well warranted in many cases". A democratic interpretation of Roman politics neatly complements an ideological revival by interpreting Roman politicians to vie for popular support at an ideological, but not factional, level. This link, however, remains tenuous, as "candidates apparently never ran on specific policies or associated themselves with particular ideologies during their campaign[s]". Moreover, speculation as to the inner motivations of Roman politicians cannot be substantiated one way or the other, as the inner thoughts of the Roman elite are almost entirely lost. Even the apparent deaths suffered by "popularis" tribunes cannot be accepted at face value: initial intentions are not final outcomes, it is unlikely that those who followed a popularis path expected death.

Mackie argued that popularis politicians had an ideological bent towards criticising the senate's legitimacy, focusing on the sovereign powers of the popular assemblies, criticising the senate for neglecting common interests, and accusing the senate of administering the state corruptly. She added that populares advocated for the popular assemblies to take control of the republic, phrasing demands in terms of libertas, referring to popular sovereignty and the power of the Roman assemblies to create law. T. P. Wiseman argues, further, that these differences reflected "rival ideologies" with "mutually incompatible [views on] what the republic was".

This democratic interpretation did not imply a party structure, instead focusing on motivations and policies. Scholars of the late republic have not reached a consensus as to whether Roman politicians really were divided in these terms. Nor does an ideological approach explain the traditional identification of certain politicians (eg Publius Sulpicius Rufus) as popularis when the policies they advanced were only weakly connected to the welfare of the Roman voter. Robb argues, moreover, that the premise of the label, ie that a certain person or policy benefits the people write large, is of little use: "the principle of acting in the popular interest was a central one that all politicians would claim to be following".

=== In rhetoric ===
The "constitutional framework in which politicians operated automatically turned policy disagreements into rhetorical contests between populus and aristocracy": tribunes which were unable to secure the support of their peers in the senate would naturally go before the people; to justify this they turned to stock arguments for popular sovereignty; opponents would then bring out similar stock arguments for senatorial authority. Young Roman politicians also turned regularly to controversial rhetoric or policies in an attempt to build their name recognition and stand out from the mass of other political candidates in their short one-year terms, with few apparent negative impacts on their longer-term career prospects.

Popularis rhetoric was couched "in terms of the consensus of values at Rome at the time: libertas, leges, mos maiorum, and senatorial incompetence at governing the res publica". In public speeches during the republic, legislative disagreements did not emerge in party-political terms: "from the rostra... neither the opponents of Tiberius Gracchus, nor Catulus against Gabinius, nor Bibulus against Caesar, nor Cato against Trebonius even so much as suggested that their advice to the populus was predicated on an 'optimate' policy based on a different arrangement of political ends and means from those of the 'popular' advocates of a bill... there was, it seems, virtually no place on the rostra for ideological bifurcation". For the Roman in the street, political debate was not related to party affiliations, but the issue and proposer itself: "Is the proposer of this agrarian (or frumentary, etc.) law really championing our interests, as he avows, or is he rather pursuing some private benefit for himself or something else behind the scenes?" which naturally flowed into the themes of personal credibility that recur in republican public rhetoric.

Like most Roman rhetoric, popularis rhetoric also drew heavily on historical precedents (exempla) – including that from ancient times, such as the revival of the comitia Centuriata as a popular law court, – from the abolition of the Roman monarchy to the popular rights and liberties won by the secession of the plebs. Popularis rhetoric surrounding secret ballots and land reform were not framed in terms of innovations, but rather, in terms of preserving and restoring the birth-right liberty of the citizenry. And populares too could hijack traditionally optimate themes by criticising current senators for failing to live up to the examples of their ancestors, acting in ways which would in the long run harm the authority of the senate, or framing their own arguments in fiscal responsibility.

Both putative groups agreed on core values such as Roman liberty and the fundamental sovereignty of the Roman people; even those who were supporting the senate at some time or another would not be able to wholly discount the traditional sovereignty attributed to the people. Furthermore, much of the perceived difference between optimates and populares emerged from rhetorical flourishes unsupported by policy: "no matter how emphatically the people’s interests and 'sovereignty' may have been asserted, the republic never saw any concrete attempts to change the nature of Roman society or shift the balance of power".

== Usage by ancient Romans ==
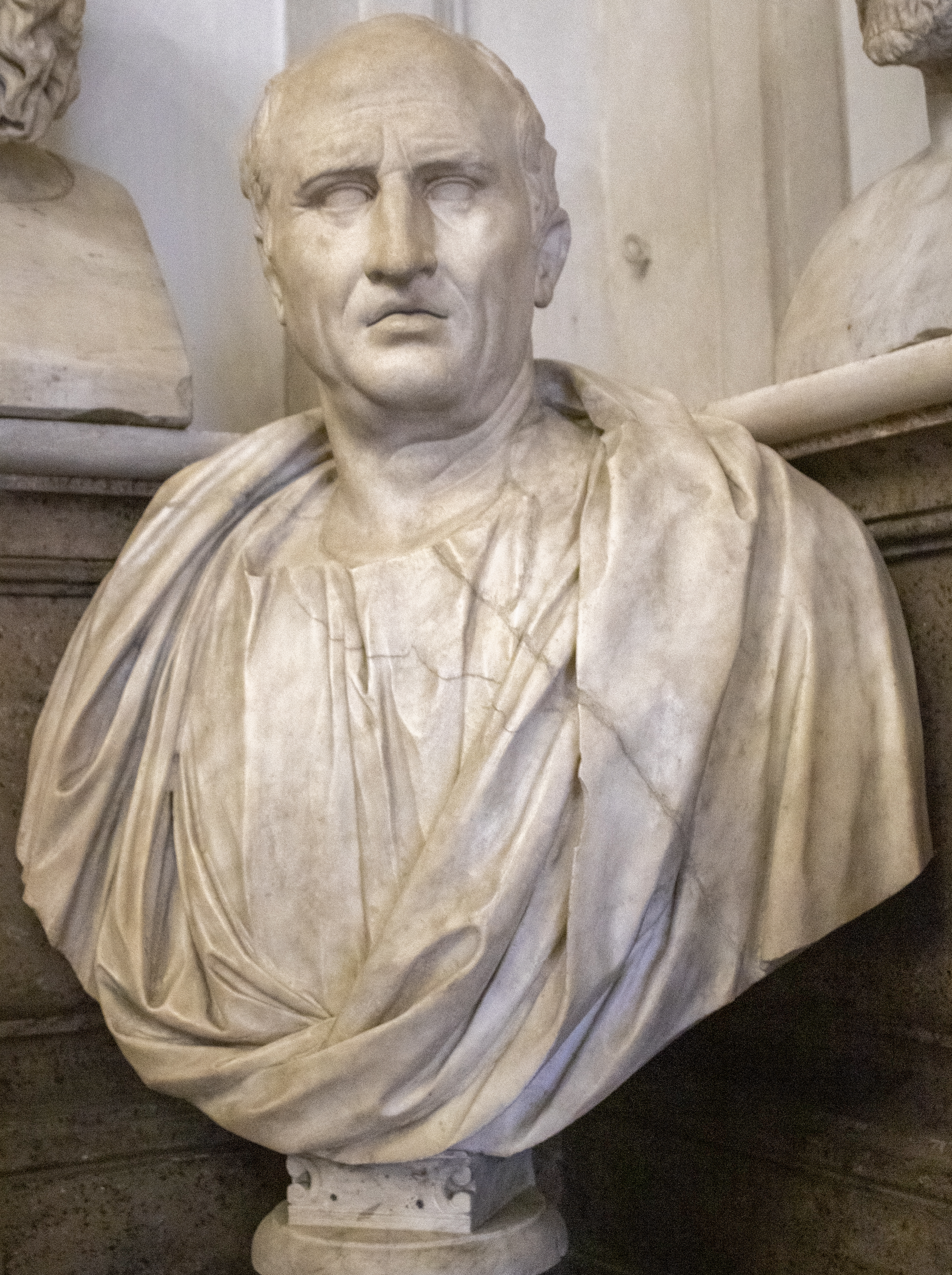
Bust of Marcus Tullius Cicero.

Beyond the modern usage of the two terms in classical studies to refer to the putative political parties, the terms also emerge from the Latin literature of the period. In Latin, the word popularis is normally used outside the works of Cicero to mean "compatriot" or "fellow citizen". The word also could be used pejoratively to refer to populists or politicians pandering to the people, politicians with great personal popularity, politicians who were ostensibly acting in the peoples' interest, and actions before crowds of the people. The word optimates, while infrequent in the surviving canon, is also used to refer to aristocrats or the aristocracy as a whole.

=== Cicero ===
In Cicero's letters – rather than his forensic speeches – he used it generally to refer to popularity. In Cicero's philosophical works, it was used to refer to "the majority of the people" and to describe "the style of speech most useful for public speaking". The oppositional meaning between populares and optimates emerges mainly from Cicero's drawing of a distinction between the two in his speech Pro Sestio, a speech made to defend a friend instrumental in recalling Cicero from exile by his political enemy Clodius. Cicero's use of the term, that "populares aim to please the multitude", is recognised to be polemical. His remarks that popularis tactics emerged from a failure to win the support of the senate and of personal grievances with the senate are also "equally suspect". Cicero's usage in that speech draws a distinction between optimates who "are honourable, honest, and upright... [and] safeguard the interests of the state and the liberty of its citizens" with populares who are not so honourable and instead engage in failed attempts to cultivate demagoguery. Cicero's description of Clodius as popularis "concentrates on the demagogic sense of the word, rather than risking attack on the rights of the people". Mouritsen writes of Cicero in Pro Sestio:

Cicero’s bold rhetorical self-reinvention in the Pro Sestio has presented historians with a deceptively simple model which at first sight seems to provide a key to unlocking the secrets of Roman politics. But the terminology Cicero uses turns out to be unique and unlike anything else found in the ancient sources... We are therefore not dealing with an observable phenomenon for which the Pro Sestio happens to offer a convenient label. Rather, it is the other way round: Cicero’s use of popularis in that particular speech has reified what would otherwise have remained discrete difficult-to-classify events and individuals and turned them into manifestations of a single political movement.

Cicero, however, did not always use the word this way. During his consulship, he "stak[ed] his own claim to being popularis [in] the popular mandate he [held] as an elected consul" and drew a distinction between himself and other politicians as to who truly acted in the interests of the Roman people. This usage did not draw a contrast between populares and optimates. He similarly uses the term popularis to describe himself in the Seventh Phillipic for his opposition to Antony and later, in the Eighth Phillipic, to describe the actions of Nasica and Opimius "for having acted in the public interests" by killing Tiberius Gracchus and Gaius Gracchus. This usage also does not contrast to optimates but instead suggests that some person is "truly acting in the interest of the people".

=== Sallust ===
Sallust, a Roman politician who served as praetor during Caesar's dictatorship, writing an account of the Catiline conspiracy and the Jugurthine War, does not use the word optimas (or optimates) at all, and uses the word popularis only ten times. None of those usages are political, referring either to countrymen or comrades. Robb speculates that "[Sallust] may have chosen to avoid using the word precisely because it was so imprecise and did not clearly identify a particular kind of politician".

In his work on the Jugurthine War, he does have a narrative of two parties: one of the people (populus) and one the nobles (nobilitas), where a small and corrupt section of the senate (pauci, 'the few') is contrasted oligarchically against the rest of society. But because the nobiles were defined not by their ideology, but by their ancestry from past holders of curule magistracies, these are not the optimates of ideological or political-party conflict, who are themselves "riven by internal divisions".

Sallust also fails to draw any distinction between popular sovereignty and senatorial prestige as sources of legitimacy or authority. He also gives the "dissenting nobles and their factions" no labels, "for the simple reason that they lacked the common characteristics which would have enabled such a categorisation", instead presenting a cynical view in which Roman politicians cloaked themselves opportunistically in terms of libertas populi Romani and senatus auctoritas as means for self-advancement.

=== Other people in the late republic ===
While ancient accounts of the late republic describe "a political 'establishment' and the opposition" thereto they do not use words such as populares to describe that opposition. Because politicians viewed their own status as reflected by the support of the people, the latter acting passively as a judge of "aristocratic merit", all politicians claimed "to be 'acting in the interest of the people', or in other words, popularis". Words used to describe dissent in the vein of Gaius Gracchus and Quintus Varius Severus trended more towards seditio and seditiosus.

The works of Livy, the author of Ab Urbe Condita Libri (known in English as the History of Rome), have been used to argue in favour of a distinction between populares and optimates through to earlier periods such as the Conflict of the Orders. Livy wrote after the late republic, during the Augustan period. However, his treatment of the late Republic does not survive except in an epitome called the Periochae. While it is generally accepted that "Livy applies late republican political language to events from earlier periods", the terms optimates and populares (and derivatives) appear infrequently and generally not in a political context.

The vast majority of the usages of popularis in Livy denote fellow citizens, comrades, and oratory suitable for public speaking. Usage of optimates is also infrequent, the majority of usages referring to foreign aristocrats. Livy's terminology in describing the conflict of the orders referred not to populares and optimates but rather to plebeians and patricians and their place in the constitutional order. Livy only uses the word popularis in contrast to optimates in political terms only once, in a speech put into the mouth of Barbatus on the tyranny of the Second Decemvirate in the 450s BC, centuries before the late republic.

== Historiography ==
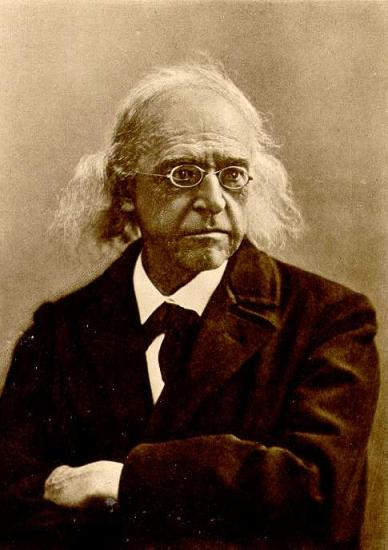
Theodor Mommsen, the 19th century German author of the highly influential Römische Geschichte.

The traditional view comes from scholarship by Theodor Mommsen during the 19th century, in which he identified both populares and optimates as modern "parliamentary-style political parties", suggesting that the conflict of the orders resulted in the formation of an aristocratic and a democratic party. For example, John Edwin Sandys, writing c. 1920 in this traditional scholarship, identified the optimates – qua party – as the killers of Tiberius Gracchus in 133 BC. Mommsen too suggested that the labels themselves became common in Gracchan times.

This view was re-evaluated, starting c. 1910 with Gelzer's Die Nobilität de Römischen Republik, with a model of Roman politics in which a candidate "could not rely on the support of an organised party[,] but instead had to cultivate a wide range of personal relationships extending both upwards and downwards in society". In later work, he returned to a more ideological interpretation of popularis, but viewed popularis politicians not as democrats, but as demagogues "more concerned about gaining the authority of the people for their plans than implementing [their] will".

By the 1930s, a far less ideological interpretation emerged, viewing Roman republican politics as dominated by parties, not of like-minded ideologues, but of aristocratic gentes. Syme in the 1939 book Roman Revolution wrote that:

The political life of the Roman Republic was stamped and swayed, not by parties and programmes of a modern and parliamentary character, not by the ostensible opposition between senate and people, optimates and populares, nobiles and novi homines, but by the strife for power, wealth and glory. The contestants were the nobiles among themselves, as individuals or in groups, open in the elections and in the courts of law, or masked by secret intrigue.

Syme's description of Roman politics viewed the late republic "as a conflict between a dominant oligarchy drawn from a set of powerful families and their opponents" which operated primarily not in ideological terms, but in terms of feuds between family-based factions. Strausberger, writing also in 1939, challenged the traditional view of political parties, arguing that "there was no 'class war'" in the various civil wars (eg Sulla's civil war and Caesar's civil war) that started the collapse of the republic.

Meier noted in 1965 that "'popular' politics was very difficult both to understand and describe[, noting] that the people itself had no political initiative but was 'directed' by the aristocratic magistrates it elected[, meaning that] 'popular' politics was... the province of politicians not the people". Moreover, "very few 'populares' appeared to embrace long term goals and most acted in a way described as popularis for only a short time". He suggested four meanings for the word popularis:

1. politicians acting as champions of the people against the senate,
2. politicians manipulating the popular assemblies,
3. politicians who took up a causa populi and paraded the people before the plebs urbana, and
4. a manner adopted by politicians who used "popular" means to prolong a political career.

His analysis viewed popularis in terms of a method "adopted by those who opposed the senatorial majority, [providing] a behavioural model which did not concern itself with attributing motive to political action". Gruen in the famous Last Generation of the Roman Republic in 1974 rejected the terms entirely:

The term optimates identified no political group. Cicero, in fact, could stretch the term to encompass not only aristocratic leaders but also Italians, [farmers], businessmen, and even freedmen. His criteria demanded only that they be honest, reasonable, and stable. It was no more than a means of expressing approbation. Romans would have had even greater difficulty in comprehending the phrase "senatorial party"... The phrase originates in an older scholarship which misapplied analogies and reduced Roman politics to a contest between the "senatorial party" and the "popular party". Such labels obscure rather than enlighten.

Brunt, writing in the 1980s–90s, took a view trending against political parties but towards an ideological dimension. He emphasised that shifting alliances and loyalties between senators precluded the existence of "durable or cohesive political factions" which could be identified as optimates or populares and that "optimates and populares did not and could not constitute parties as we know them". Moreover, he argued there were no "large groups of politicians, bound together by ties of kinship or friendship, or by fidelity to a leader, who [acted] together consistently for any considerable time" and that "of large, cohesive, and durable coalitions of families there is no evidence at all for any period". Instead, he argued that the distinction was not one of permanent factional strife, but rather, of support and opposition of the senate: popularis politicians, while not being "reformers" per se, would resort to the popular assemblies if they felt intervention from the people was desirable, with an ideological distinction dividing Roman politicians as to what was in the public interest.

The optimates were explored by Burckhardt in 1988, viewing them as portions of the nobility acting to advance laws against corruption, electoral bribery, and overly flagrant displays of wealth (ie laws on repetundae, ambitus, and sumptuaria) with tactics such as vetoes and obstructionism; however, Gruen noted in 1995 that this analysis provided "no clear criteria" for determining anything about the makeup, size, or organisation of the group. Identification of optimates also continues to be difficult. They have been identified as "members of an 'aristocratic party' to upholders of senatorial authority to supporters of the class interests of the wealthy".

Mackie argued in a 1992 influential paper revitalising the ideological view that ratio popularis implied and required substantial argumentation based on Roman tradition to justify the intervention of the popular assemblies. Such argumentation took the form of an ideology of popular sovereignty, self-justifying the leadership of the comitia in the state. Hölkeskamp suggested in 1997 that popularis ideology reflected a history of senatorial intransigence characterised as "partial and unlawful" which, over time, eroded the legitimacy of the senate in the republic. Morstein-Marx's book on mass oratory in the republic – often before contiones or assemblies of the people – focused, however, on how both opponents and supporters of legislation attempted to portray themselves as "true" popularis acting in the interest of the people and the other as demagoguery.

There continues to be debate as to the utility of the terms in scholarship. In 1994, Andrew Lintott wrote in The Cambridge Ancient History that although both factions came from the same social class, there is "no reason to deny the divergence of ideology highlighted by Cicero" with themes and leaders stretching back in Cicero's time for hundreds of years. T. P. Wiseman similarly lamented an "ideological vacuum" in 2009, promoting the term as a label for ideology rather than for political factionalism in the vein of Mommsen.

Other recent publications have continued to contest the topic. M. A. Robb argued in her 2010 book Beyond Populares and Optimates that the labels emerge from Cicero's writings and were "far from corresponding with definite parties or definite policies". It seems Romans did not use the terms themselves: for example, Caesar and Sallust never identified Caesar as a member of any populares "faction". "The terms populares and optimates were not common and everyday labels used to categorise certain types of late republican politician". Robb rejects usage of both populares and optimates writ large, as all Roman politicians would have asserted their devotion to public liberty and also have asserted their own excellence; instead of populares to describe demagoguery, Romans would have used seditiosi. Similarly, Henrik Mouritsen, writing in the 2017 book Politics in the Roman Republic rejects the putative categories entirely, supporting a "politics without 'parties'" in the vein of Meier, where politicians "at certain moments in their career[s] used their powers without the backing of their peers".
