= Odotheus =

Greuthungi king

Odotheus (in Zosimus Aedotheus) was a Greuthungi king who in 386 led an incursion into the Roman Empire. He was defeated and killed by the Roman general Promotus. His surviving people settled in Phrygia.

== Invasion of Roman Empire ==
After the major Gothic entry into the Roman Empire in 376, there still remained substantial numbers of Goths in several kingdoms north and east of the lower Danube. In the year 386 the king Odotheus led his people into the Empire, possibly fleeing Hunnic hegemony, but Heather (1996:103) disputes this. The incursion was described as a heavy assault against the Romans and constituted the second opposition on the Lower Danube frontier, since other Gothic groups also fought the Romans on the same front. An account cited that the Greuthungi were crushed when they tried to cross the Danube. It is also said that many of these armed troops perished in an ambush since the Danube crossing was partially successful. This incident was noted in Claudian's Panegyric, which was delivered to honor Emperor Honorius' fourth consulate.

Odotheus was brought to battle and killed by the general Promotus. Zosimus gives two versions (4.35 and 4.38-9), generally thought to be of the same story; the second version calls them Grothingi and speaks of a betrayal (or entrapment) by Promotus. The survivors of his people were settled in Phrygia; some were drafted into the Army and some became agricultural labourers.

== Fate of Odotheus' People ==
In 399, Tribigild, a Gothic commander in Roman service who led a unit of these Phrygian survivors of Odotheus' kingdom, rose in revolt. Michael Kulikowski suggests the Goths of Tribigild were in fact survivors of the massacres in Asia Minor of 378/9, after the Battle of Adrianople. Gainas, another Gothic general sent to suppress him, suborned Tribigild's revolt for his own purposes. After some initial successes, Gainas was suppressed and fled north of the Danube, only to be killed by the Hunnic chieftain Uldin. Thus perished many of Odotheus' remaining people; the fate of the rest in Phrygia is unknown.

The Greuthungi's settlement in Phrygia facilitated the so-called Gothicization of the Danubian provinces and, later, Asia Minor.

== Sources ==
- Heather, Peter (1996). The Goths. Oxford: Blackwell Publishers. ISBN 0-631-16536-3.
- Kulikowski, Michael (October 30, 2006). Rome's Gothic Wars: From the Third Century to Alaric. Cambridge University Press. ISBN 1139458094.
- Zosimus, Novae Historiae bk 4, bk 5
