= Battle of Pollentia =

402 battle between Romans and Visigoths

Coordinates: 44.7000°N 7.8500°E

- Part of the Gothic War of 401–403 and Roman–Germanic Wars
Date	6 April 402
Location	Pollentia, Western Roman Empire (modern-day Pollenzo, Italy)
Result	Roman victory

Belligerents
Western Roman Empire	Visigoths

Commanders and leaders
Stilicho; Honorius	Alaric I

Strength
10,000–15,000	10,000–15,000

Casualties and losses
Unknown	Unknown

The Battle of Pollentia was fought on 6 April 402 between the Romans under Stilicho and the Visigoths under Alaric I, during the first Gothic invasion of Italy (401–403). The Romans were victorious, and forced Alaric to retreat, though he rallied to fight again in the next year in the Battle of Verona, where he was again defeated. After this, Alaric retreated from Italy, leaving the province in peace until his second invasion in 409, after Stilicho's death.

== Background ==
Theodosius I, the last emperor of both the eastern and western halves of the Roman Empire, died in 395, leaving his sons Arcadius and Honorius emperors of the East and West, respectively. However, the weakness of character of the two brothers, and their young age upon their accession to the throne, made it possible for ambitious and sometimes unscrupulous ministers to assume the effective rule of the Empire.

In the west, the able Magister Militum, Stilicho, assumed the administration. In spite of his supposed Vandal extraction, Stilicho had earned Theodosius' favor, and consequently was married by him to his niece, Serena, thus uniting him to the imperial family. At his death, Theodosius nominated Stilicho to govern the Empire during the minority of his sons. Rufinus who had ascended to the prefecture of the East, usurped control of the Eastern Empire in the name of Arcadius, and demonstrated open hostility to Honorius, resulting in permanent division between the courts of Theodosius' sons in the east and west. Zosimus, the Byzantine historian of the 5th century, describes the state of the Empire after the death of Theodosius: "The empire now devolved upon Arcadius and Honorius, who, although apparently the rulers, were so in name only: complete control was exercised by Rufinus in the east and Stilicho in the west." Even as Honorius grew older (he was ten at his ascension and seventeen at the Battle of Pollentia) "[he] was a feeble nonentity."

Stilicho, intending to rid the Empire of Rufinus and assume sole control over the whole of Theodosius' inheritance, in accordance with the latter's express orders, dispatched Gainas, a Gothic general, to destroy the haughty prefect. Gainas effected the commission, though he was reduced to flagrant treachery. Next, however, he turned on his patron Stilicho, joining with the Eunuch Eutropius to supplant the influence of the Vandal minister over Arcadius; later, they would declare Stilicho a public enemy. The eastern and western administrations would remain disunited till 476 when the western empire finally collapsed.

Meanwhile, about the time of Rufinus' fall, the Visigoths, excited by Alaric (who would later be crowned king of the Visigoths), broke into rebellion, renouncing their titles as Romans and foederati. Their pretext was the failure of the Imperial court to supply them with the promised tribute, though it is speculated that Rufinus, who had failed to provide for resistance, was in fact originally guilty of inciting the Gothic insurrection, to distract Stilicho. They began wreaking havoc in land very close to Constantinople and ironically, the city had to buy off the Visigoths to end the threat. This short-sighted policy of bribery only backfired as Alaric, when he had exhausted the resources of Thrace by his plundering, turned south-west to invade Greece in the following year. Although Stilicho marched in force to succor Greece from the barbarians, and succeeded in penning Alaric up in the mountains of Arcadia, coming close to destroying the barbarians for good, Alaric managed to escape, crossing the Gulf of Corinth to Epirus; here, he negotiated a treaty with Arcadius (or Eutropius) by which Alaric would receive the control of eastern Illyricum, with the rank of Magister Militum, in the service of the eastern empire. In the meantime, Stilicho was ordered by the court of Constantinople to leave Greece immediately; wishing to avoid a civil war, Stilicho reluctantly complied, returning to Italy.

Alaric, established in his new Illyrian command, now set his sights on the western empire. Crowned king of the Goths by his troops for his successes hitherto, Alaric only waited long enough to exploit the resources of the Imperial armories in the province to finally supply his troops with adequate weapons and armor, and then invaded Italy, in late 401 or early 402. The Imperial court at Milan was immediately threatened by the invasion, but Stilicho, thinking that the emperor's flight would demoralize his subjects, persuaded Honorius to stay put while he himself crossed the Alps north to recruit reinforcements from Gaul and the barbarians of Germany. Italy itself contained no forces with which to resist the Goths. The Alemanni, who were then invading Rhaetia, were won over by Stilicho, and joined the Gallic legions, whom they had been fighting, in Stilicho's effort to save the emperor.

Stilicho had relied on the rivers of northern Italy to delay the barbarians long enough for his return; however, the unusual dryness of the weather left the rivers shallow and an insufficient barrier to Alaric's approach. Thus, by the time Stilicho arrived in Italy with his reinforcements, he found that Honorius had deserted Milan before the Gothic march, and had taken refuge in a city of Liguria (probably Hasta on the Tanarus), after being overtaken on the road by a contingent of Gothic cavalry. Alaric had brought up his main army to besiege Honorius in the city when Stilicho arrived, forcing the Gothic king to break camp and retire westward.

== Battle ==
Interrupted (as above) by Stilicho's arrival in the attempt to lay siege to Hasta, the barbarians retreated west to Pollentia. Although some of his soldiers wished to continue the retreat, Alaric remained resolved to force the issue, and prepared for a pitched battle with the Roman army. In view of this Stilicho, hoping to take Alaric by surprise, chose to attack on Easter Sunday, 6 April 402, when the Arian Goths would be occupied with religious celebration. (Stilicho's impiety is a subject of scandal amongst some Christian historians.) The result of the ensuing battle is a subject of partisan controversy, with most of the Roman sources claiming a clear victory, while the Gothic writers affirm the opposite result. Alaric rallied his unprepared army with skill and courage to meet the Roman attack, and even succeeded in routing the Roman auxiliary cavalry of the Alani, whose king fell in the battle. However, according to the most reliable writers, the Goths were ultimately driven from the field with slaughter, and their camp was stormed and plundered by the victorious Romans. The recapture of the spoils of Greece and northern Italy, which had followed in Alaric's baggage train through the campaign, might alone justify Stilicho's claim of a great victory. The conclusion of Claudian, Honorius' court-poet, demonstrates fairly well at least the Roman view of the battle: "Thy glory, Pollentia, shall live for ever...Fate pre-ordained thee to be the scene of our victory and the burial-place of the barbarians."

Stilicho offered to return the prisoners in exchange for the Visigoths returning to Illyricum, but upon reaching Verona, Alaric stopped his retreat and endeavoured to capture the city. Stilicho and local forces surrounded the Visigoths and defeated them in the Battle of Verona. With many of his generals deserting him and swearing allegiance to Stilicho, Alaric was forced to leave Italy.

== Aftermath ==
By 403 Alaric and the Visigoths had been pushed back to the Balkans where they remained a minor threat. In 405 (according to Adrian Goldsworthy) or 407 (according to Averil Cameron) Stilicho and Alaric formed a treaty which conceded the latter's demands of title for himself and concession of 4,000 pounds of gold for his troops in exchange for absolute allegiance to the former. Many senators were already upset that Stilicho wielded so much power and influence over the emperor Honorius and they knew he had his sights on the eastern empire as well. When the senators heard of this treaty with the barbarian king Alaric, Stilicho was declared a public enemy and guilty of treason in 408. He was executed shortly after.

Modern historian Peter Brown suggest that this was a mistake. "A strident chauvinism and a refusal to negotiate with the barbarians led to the sack of Rome in 410", during which Romans had to pay three times as much as Alaric originally wanted in order to ransom their city back from the Visigoths.

== Sources ==
- Claudian. The Gothic War. Trans. Maurice Platnauer. London: W. Heinemann, 1922. Print. Loeb Classical Library. p. 173.
- Gibbon, Edward. The History of the Decline and Fall of the Roman Empire, Book IV, pp. 15–17.
- Reynolds, Julian. Defending Rome: The Masters of the Soldiers. (2011). (n.p.): Xlibris AU.
- Burns, T. S., Burns, T. S. (1994). Barbarians Within the Gates of Rome: A Study of Roman Military Policy and the Barbarians, Ca.375–425 A.D.. United States: Indiana University Press.
