= Eucherius (son of Stilicho) =

Son of Stilicho

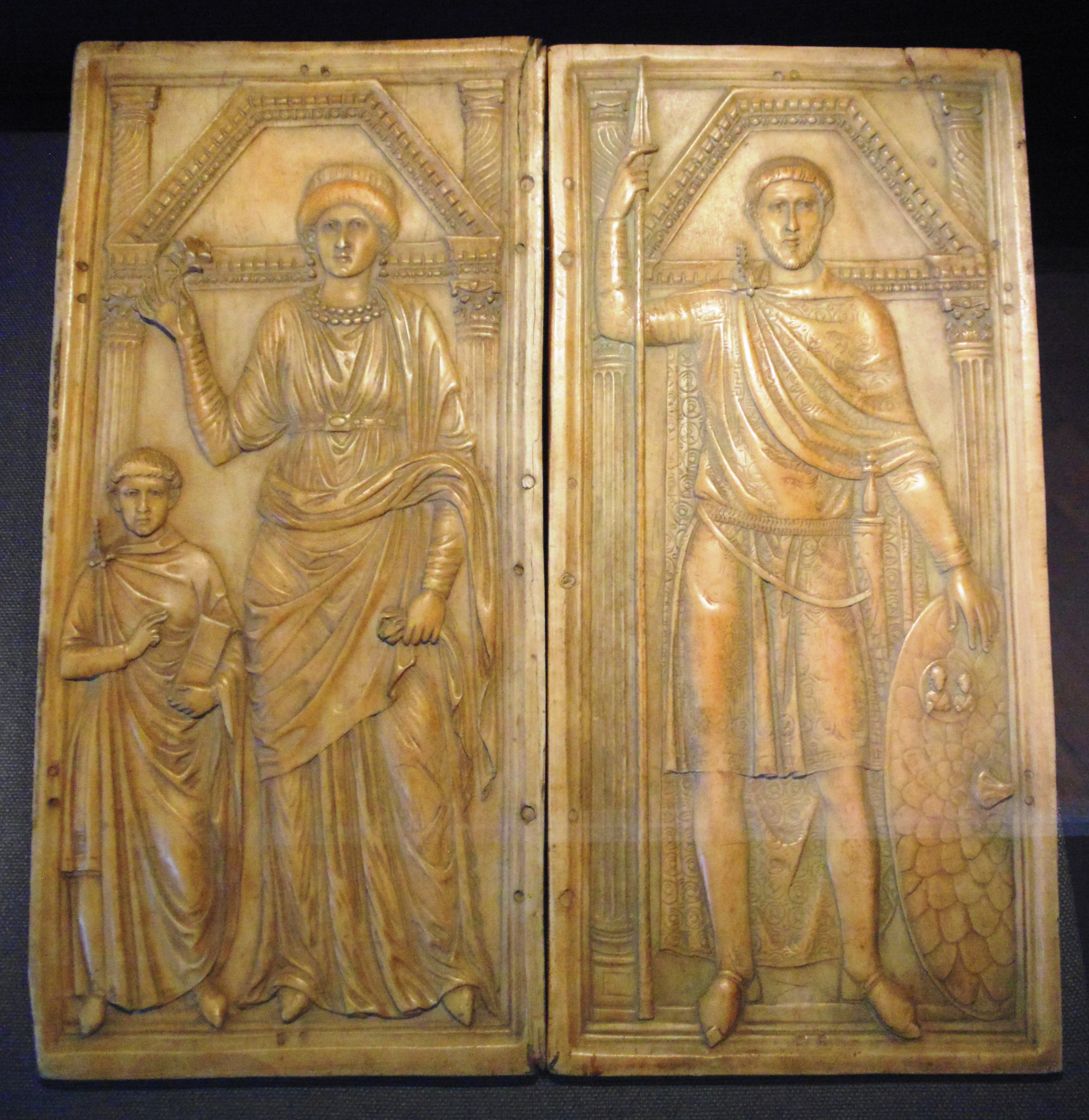
- An ivory diptych believed to be of Eucherius (left bottom) with his father Stilicho (right) and mother Serena (middle), c. 395
- Born: c. 388; Rome, Italy
- Died: After 22 August 408 (Aged 19 or 20); Ravenna, Italy
- Father: Stilicho
- Mother: Serena

Eucherius was the son of Stilicho, the magister militum of the Western Roman Empire, and Serena, a Roman noblewoman who was the niece of Eastern Roman Emperor Theodosius I. He was born in c. 388 in Rome, Italy. Despite being the son of the magister militum, Eucherius did not rise farther than the modest rank of tribune of the notaries. Stilicho was accused by his political opponents of plotting to install Eucherius as a third emperor in Illyricum, and as a result of this Stilicho was arrested and executed on 22 August 408, and Eucherius soon after.

== Life ==
=== Early life and family ===
Eucherius was born in c. 388 in Rome to Stilicho, the magister militum (master of soldiers) of the Western Roman Empire, and Serena, a Roman noblewoman who was the niece of Eastern Roman Emperor Theodosius I. That Eucherius was born in Rome is known from Claudian's De Consulatu Stilichonis III.177, where he described Rome as being the place where Eucherius "first beheld the light". Eucherius was named after the uncle of Theodosius I, Flavius Eucherius. Eucherius was the only son of Stilicho and Serena, but he had two sisters, Maria and Thermantia, both of whom married Emperor Honorius, from February 398–407/408 and 408–August 408, respectively.

The exact birth date of Eucherius is unknown, however, he must have been born sometime before 405, as he was shown as a child in a consular diptych of Stilicho, although whether the diptych was for Stilicho's consulship in 400 or 405 is unknown. The poet Claudian describes Eucherius as being in his early manhood in De Consulatu Stilichonis I.123, which was written in 404. The passage describes Eucherius riding on horseback and hunting purple stags, which the historian Clare Coombe suggests is a reference to the rumors that Stilicho plotted to have Eucherius become emperor. From this, the historian J. B. Bury suggested that Eucherius was born c. 388; he must have been born before 389, as he is described as a baby at this time in a narrative of Theodosius' visit to Rome.

Stilicho served as a general for Eastern Emperor Theodosius and proved himself capable at the Battle of the Frigidus in 394, where Theodosius defeated Eugenius and gained control of both the Eastern Roman Empire and the Western Roman Empire, becoming the last emperor to control both. When Theodosius died in 395 he granted the Eastern Empire to his son Arcadius, and the Western Empire to his son Honorius, and appointed Stilicho the guardian of Honorius. Claudian stated in De Consulatu Stilichonis II.352‑361, and hints again in Consulatu Honorii Augusti 1.552‑554, that Stilicho intended to have Eucherius marry Galla Placidia, the half-sister of Honorius.

=== Later life ===
In late 406 Stilicho demanded that the province of Illyricum, which Theodosius had reassigned to the Eastern Empire, be returned to the control of the Western Empire, on the threat of war. The exact reasoning for this is disputed: the historian Peter Heather suggests that Stilicho intended to use Illyricum to base Visigothic King Alaric I, in order to use his troops against the Alans, Vandals and Sueves that were threatening to raid the west; Bury suggests that the actual goal of this plan was to establish a separate domain to be ruled by Eucherius, splitting the Roman Empire into three and making Eucherius a third emperor. Eucherius had never been granted any significant offices by his father, the highest being the modest office of tribute et notarius (tribune of the notaries), a largely ceremonial office held by young members of the nobility, which he was granted in c. 396, aged 7. This office made him a vir clarissimus (literally "very famous man", a formal indication of an individual's rank). Bury viewed this as an attempt by Stilicho to avoid suspicion of his plots to place Eucherius on the throne. However, the historian Edward Gibbon viewed it instead as being proof against the veracity of the allegations, as Stilicho would be unlikely to keep Eucherius in such a low office for so long if he intended him to one day become emperor.

When the demand was refused by Arcadius, Stilicho began, in 407, to form a plan to invade the province. While Stilicho was still formulating his plan in 408, the news came that Constantine III, who had declared himself Western Roman Emperor in opposition to Honorius in 407, was planning to cross the English Channel from his base in Britain into Gaul, and therefore become a direct threat to Honorius' rule. Additionally, a false report spread that Alaric had been killed. Because of Constantine's arrival in Gaul, along with the belief that Alaric was dead, Stilicho was forced to shelve his plans of invading Illyricum and focus his attention upon repelling Constantine. Stilicho had already assembled a force in Gaul in late 406 by inviting a mixed group of Germanic tribes, which the ancient historians Orosius and Prosper Tiro state was part of a plan to force Honorius to elevate Eucherius to Western Roman Emperor. Bury suggests that this was done not to force Honorius to make Eucherius emperor, but to guard Gaul to allow him to reassign his forces for the invasion of Illyricum.

Stilicho sent Sarus, a Gothic general, to lead troops against Constantine in Gaul. Initially, Sarus won some victories, and succeeded in slaying Iustinianus and Nebiogastes, two of Constantine's generals. His success was brought to an end when his siege of Valence was repelled by reserve forces led by Edobichus and Gerontius, forcing him to retreat to Italy and seal off the Alps to prevent Constantine from attacking Italy itself. While this was happening, Alaric demanded payment for the time he had spent in Epirus waiting to attack Illyricum, and marched to the Julian Alps, threatening to invade Italy if he was not given large amounts of money. The Roman Senate initially favored declaring war against Alaric, until Stilicho influenced them to give in to his demands.

After Arcadius died on 1 May 408, Honorius considered invading the Eastern Empire so as to control both empires, as his father had, taking it from the control of the seven-year-old Theodosius II. Honorius summoned Stilicho to consult with him on the matter. Stilicho suggested that Honorius send Alaric to defeat Constantine in Gaul, and send himself to attack the Eastern Empire. Bury views this as an attempt by Stilicho to seize control of Illyricum, if not the entirety of the Eastern Empire, for Eucherius, without indebting himself further to Alaric by using his forces. It is also alleged that Eucherius intended to gain support by restoring paganism to the empire. However, a revolt broke out against Stilicho, when Roman soldiers at Ticinum rose up and killed many of Stilicho's allies. This revolt was orchestrated by a well-organized and coordinated group of Stilicho's political opponents. These opponents charged Stilicho with failing to deal with Constantine, that he had planned the assassination of Rufinus, and treason for planning to make Eucherius emperor. As a result of the revolt Stilicho fled to Ravenna. During this time Olympius, an advisor of Honorius and political rival of Stilicho, convinced Honorius of Stilicho's alleged treason, leading to Stilicho being arrested and executed on 22 August 408. Eucherius fled to Rome, aided by some of the soldiers of his father, and he was able to find refuge in a church for some time but was murdered by Arsacius and Terentius on Honorius' orders.
