= Stilicho's Pictish War =

Possible war between Roman forces led by Stilicho and the Picts in Britain (c.398)

Date	396-401 (disputed)
Location	Britain
Result	Imperial victory

Belligerents
Western Roman Empire	Picts; Saxons; Gaels

Commanders and leaders
Stilicho	Unknown

Stilicho's Pictish War was a war between the forces of the Western Roman Empire led by Stilicho and the Picts in Britain around 398 AD. Little is known about the conflict. The only real source is the panegyric In Eutropium by Claudian. Another source is Gildas' sixth-century De Excidio et Conquestu Britanniae. The war ended in a Roman victory.

== Sources ==
This war is recounted in Claudianus’s panegyric In Eutropium, which praises Stilicho. It mentions the Gildonic uprising in Africa that Stilicho had to deal with and that Britannia was suffering from attacks by the Saxons, Picts, and Scots. The praise ended with the verse: "defeated the Saxons, the ocean calmed down, the Picts broke, and Great Britain safe." Another poem by Claudianus refers to a possible expedition to Britannia by Stilicho in 396-398. In the Excidio et Conquestu Britanniae of the British monk Gildas, this conflict is called one of the three Pictic wars. Later historians such as Edward Gibbon have also written about this episode.

== Course of the war ==
Britannia had a relatively quiet period after the campaign of Count Theodosius in 368. This period ended when the Picts attacked the northern border area of Britannia and made it unsafe with looting raids. At the same time, the eastern and southern coastal areas were harassed by Saxon invaders and invaded Scots in the east. The expedition army sent by Stilicho to put an end to these attacks probably consisted of the Gallic veterans who previously successfully acted against Gildon's African uprising. It is uncertain whether Stilicho himself led this expedition or ordered to do so. The outcome of the war was clear, after a series of skirmishes, the Romans defeated the Picts. The Saxons and Scots experienced the same fate. In 400, Stilicho seems to have had repairs carried out to the Wall of Hadrian with money collected during the African campaign. Archaeological evidence that this war has taken place is missing.

== Aftermath ==
The War of Stilicho is the last great feat of war of the Romans in Britain. In 401 Stilicho was preparing for a new campaign against the Vandals and Alans north of the Alpine region. He moved his Gallic legion from Britannia to join The main force in Italy. The military presence of the Romans in Britain therefore receded and would create the circumstance that led to the uprising of the British garrison in 407 when Gaul was overrun by the Germans.
