= Maria (wife of Honorius) =

Western Roman emperor from 398 to 407

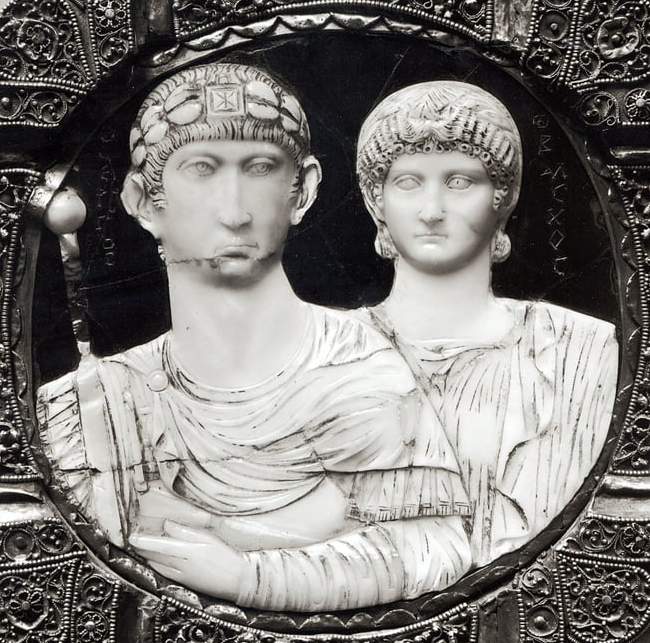
- 5th-century cameo depicting Maria (right) and her husband Honorius (left)

Empress of the Roman Empire
- Tenure: 398 – 407
- Born: c. 385
- Died: 407; Ravenna
- Burial: Old St. Peter's Basilica
- Spouse: Honorius
- Dynasty: Theodosian
- Father: Stilicho
- Mother: Serena

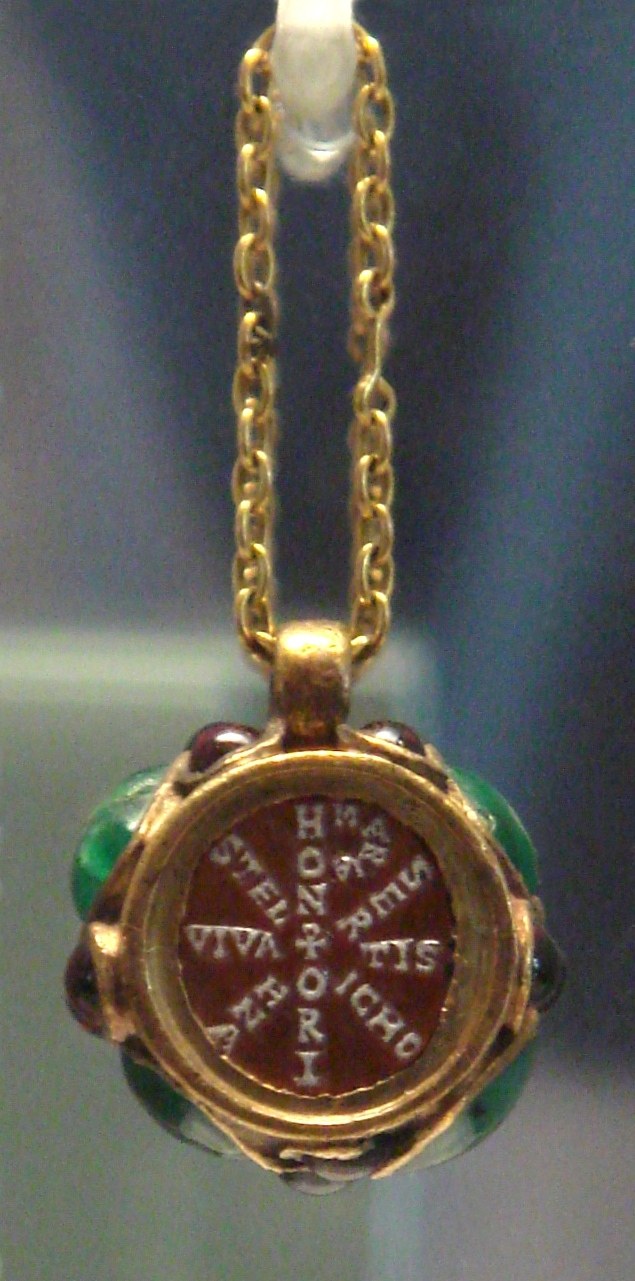
Maria's pendant, now on display at the Louvre. The names of Maria's parents and husband are arranged to form the Chi Rho. The pendant reads, around a central cross (clockwise) on the obverse: HONORI MARIA SERHNA VIVATIS STELICHO. and on the reverse, STELICHO SERENA EUCHERI THERMANTIA VIVATIS

Maria (died 407) was the first empress consort of Honorius, Western Roman Emperor. She was the daughter of the general Stilicho. Around 398 she married her first cousin, the Emperor Honorius. It is uncertain when she was born, but she was probably no older than fourteen at the time of her marriage. Maria had no children, and died in 407. After her death, Honorius married her sister, Thermantia.

== Family ==
Maria was a daughter of Stilicho, magister militum of the Western Roman Empire, and Serena. Her siblings were Eucherius and Thermantia. "De Consulatu Stilichonis" by Claudian reports that her unnamed paternal grandfather was a cavalry officer under Valens, Emperor of the Eastern Roman Empire. Orosius clarifies that her paternal grandfather was a Romanized Vandal. The fragmentary chronicle of John of Antioch, a 7th-century monk tentatively identified with John of the Sedre, Syrian Orthodox Patriarch of Antioch from 641 to 648 calls the grandfather a Scythian, probably following Late Antique practice to dub any people inhabiting the Pontic–Caspian steppe as "Scythians", regardless of their language. Jerome calls Stilicho a semibarbarian, which has been interpreted to mean that Maria's unnamed paternal grandmother was a Roman.

The poem "In Praise of Serena" by Claudian and the "Historia Nova" by Zosimus clarify that Maria's maternal grandfather was an elder Honorius, a brother to Theodosius I. Both were sons of Count Theodosius and Thermantia, as clarified in the "Historia Romana" by Paul the Deacon. Genealogists consider it likely that Maria was named after her maternal grandmother, tentatively giving said grandmother the name "Maria".

== Marriage ==
In c. February, 398, Maria married Honorius, her maternal first cousin, once removed. Her husband was a son of Theodosius I and his first wife Aelia Flaccilla. Honorius was not yet fourteen-years-old. The Epithalamion written in their honor by Claudian survives. He places his flattering description of Maria in the mouth of Venus, a Roman goddess principally associated with love, beauty and fertility, the equivalent of the Greek goddess Aphrodite. "E'en though no ties of blood united thee to the royal house, though thou wert in no way related thereto, yet would thy beauty render thee worthy of a kingdom. What face could rather win a sceptre? What countenance better adorn a palace? Redder than roses thy lips, whiter than the hoar-frost thy neck, cowslips are not more yellow than thine hair, fire not more bright than thine eyes. With how fine an interspace do the delicate eyebrows meet upon thy forehead! How just the blend that makes thy blush, thy fairness not o'ermantled with too much red! Pinker thy fingers than Aurora's, firmer thy shoulders than Diana's; even thy mother dost thou surpass. If Bacchus, Ariadne's lover, could transform his mistress' garland into a constellation how comes it that a more beauteous maid has no crown of stars?"

There is a scholarly debate about how old Maria was. This would depend on when her parents were married. Passages of "De Consulatu Stilichonis" by Claudian, report that Stilicho first rose to fame through successfully negotiating a peace treaty with the Sassanid Empire, then was chosen by Theodosius I to marry his niece. The account seems to report that (1)Stilicho negotiated the treaty of mutual friendship between Theodosius I and Shapur III (2) Theodosius I and Aelia Flaccilla acted as adoptive parents to Serena, possibly following the deaths of her natural parents. The treaty has been usually dated to 384, but dates as late as 387 have been suggested for both the treaty and the marriage following it. By any estimation, Maria would be at most fourteen-years-old at the time of her marriage.

== Empress ==
According to the account of Zosimus, "When Maria was about to be married to Honorius, her mother, deeming her too young for the marriage-state and being unwilling to defer the marriage, although she thought that to submit so young and tender a person to the embraces of a man was offering violence to nature, she had recourse to a woman who knew how to manage such affairs, and by her means contrived that Maria should live with the emperor and share his bed, but that he should not have the power to deprive her of virginity. In the meantime Maria died a virgin, and Serena, who, as may readily be supposed, was desirous to become the grandmother of a young emperor or empress, through fear of her influence being diminished, used all her endeavours to marry her other daughter to Honorius." The account may have attempted to explain why Maria died without giving birth. However this might also be explained by the young ages of the imperial couple, the tale of Honorius being drugged by his mother-in-law Serena considered fanciful. Her sister Thermantia went on to marry Honorius.

== Sources ==
- Martindale, John R.; Jones, A. H. M.; Morris, John, eds. (1971). "Flavius Stilicho". The Prosopography of the Later Roman Empire: Volume I, AD 260–395. Cambridge: Cambridge University Press. pp. 853–858. ISBN 0-521-07233-6.
- Martindale, John R., ed. (1980). "Aemilia Materna Thermantia". The Prosopography of the Later Roman Empire: Volume II, AD 395–527. Cambridge: Cambridge University Press. pp. 1111–1112. ISBN 0-521-20159-4.
- Zosimus, New History. London: Green and Chaplin (1814). Book 5.

Royal titles
Preceded by Galla; First following the division with the Eastern Roman Empire	Western Roman Empress consort 398–407	Succeeded by Thermantia
