= 402 =

402 in various calendars
| Gregorian calendar | 402; CDII |
| Ab urbe condita | 1155 |
| Assyrian calendar | 5152 |
| Balinese saka calendar | 323–324 |
| Bengali calendar | −192 – −191 |
| Berber calendar | 1352 |
| Buddhist calendar | 946 |
| Burmese calendar | −236 |
| Byzantine calendar | 5910–5911 |
| Chinese calendar | 辛丑年 (Metal Ox); 3099 or 2892 — to — 壬寅年 (Water Tiger); 3100 or 2893 |
| Coptic calendar | 118–119 |
| Discordian calendar | 1568 |
| Ethiopian calendar | 394–395 |
| Hebrew calendar | 4162–4163 |
- Hindu calendars
| Vikram Samvat | 458–459 |
| Shaka Samvat | 323–324 |
| Kali Yuga | 3502–3503 |
| Holocene calendar | 10402 |
| Iranian calendar | 220 BP – 219 BP |
| Islamic calendar | 227 BH – 226 BH |
| Javanese calendar | 285–286 |
| Julian calendar | 402; CDII |
| Korean calendar | 2735 |
| Minguo calendar | 1510 before ROC 民前1510年 |
| Nanakshahi calendar | −1066 |
| Seleucid era | 713/714 AG |
| Thai solar calendar | 944–945 |
| Tibetan calendar | ལྕགས་མོ་གླང་ལོ་ (female Iron-Ox); 528 or 147 or −625 — to — ཆུ་ཕོ་སྟག་ལོ་ (male Water-Tiger); 529 or 148 or −624 |

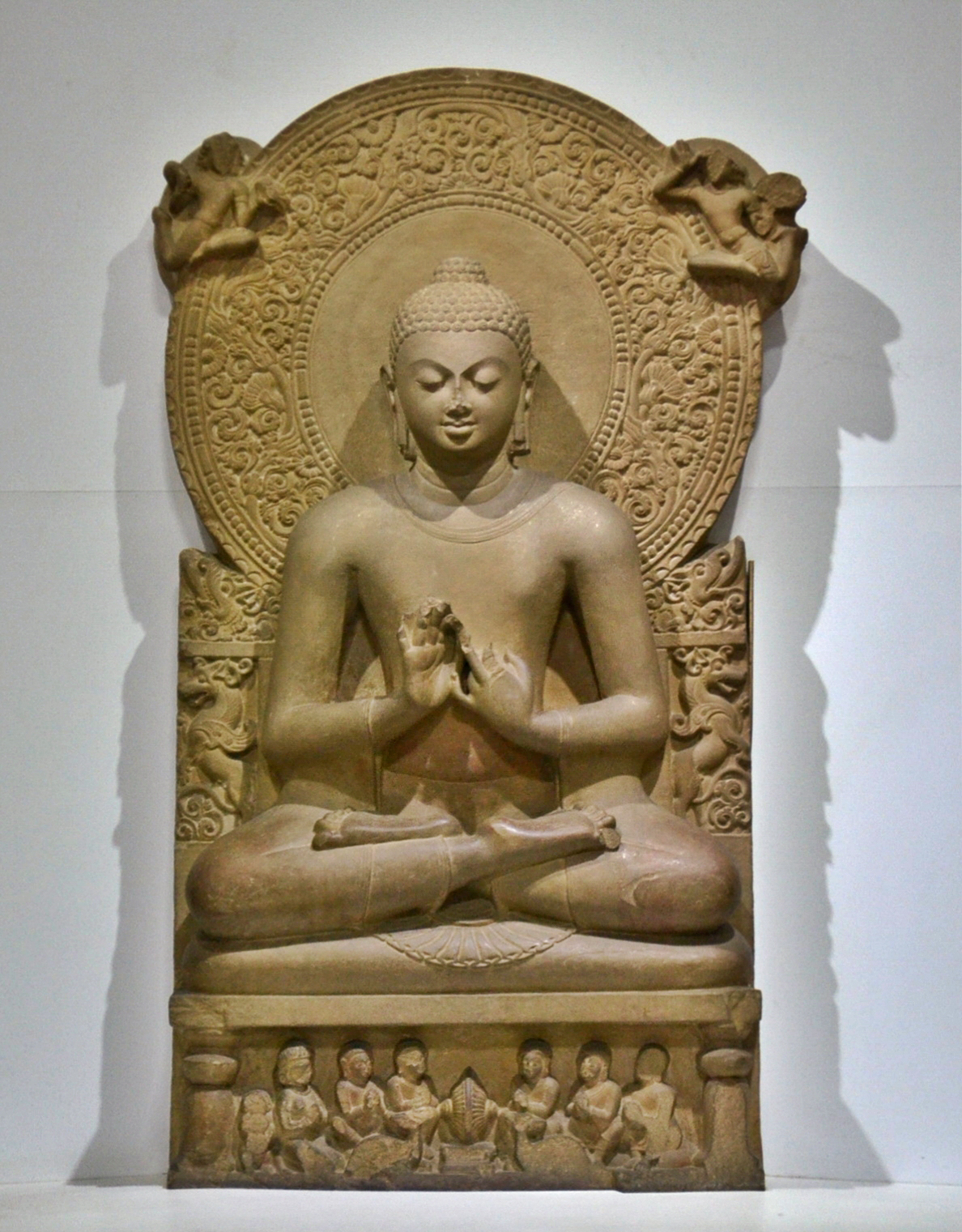
A statue of Siddhartha Gautama (India)

Year 402 (CDII) was a common year starting on Wednesday of the Julian calendar. At the time, it was known as the Year of the Consulship of Arcadius and Honorius (or, less frequently, year 1155 Ab urbe condita). The denomination 402 for this year has been used since the early medieval period, when the Anno Domini calendar era became the prevalent method in Europe for naming years.

== Events ==
=== By place ===
==== Roman Empire ====
- The Visigoths advance on Mediolanum (modern Milan) and besiege Asti in Liguria. King Alaric I sends envoys to negotiate a peace, but the Roman government refuses to make deals with "barbarians."
- April 6 – Battle of Pollentia: Stilicho recalls troops from Britain and the Rhine frontier to defend Italy. He decides to attack the Goths on Easter Sunday, and manages to capture Alaric's wife and children.
- Emperors Arcadius and his younger brother Honorius become Roman consuls.

==== Asia ====
- King Gwanggaeto the Great of Goguryeo (Korea) defeats the forces of Later Yan, seizing some of their border fortresses.
- The Rouran, led by Shelun (Chö-louen), having defeated the Gaoju Dingling (Kao-kiu Ting-ling) near Kobbo, establish a nomadic empire that ranges from the Mongolian Plateau to the Irtysh.
- Fa-Hien, Chinese Buddhist monk, makes a pilgrimage to India, initiating Sino-Indian relations. Stirred by his faith to Buddhism, he visits the sites of Siddhartha Gautama's life.
- Silseong becomes king of the Korean kingdom of Silla.

=== By topic ===
==== Religion ====
- Jerome writes "Apologiae contra Rufinum" and "Liber tertius seu ultima responsio adversus scripta Rufini".
- The Pure Land school of Buddhism founds a monastery upon the top of Mount Lushan.
- Cynegius, acting for Emperor Arcadius at the insistence of Bishop Porphyry, orders the destruction of pagan temples in Gaza.

== Deaths ==
- Empress Dowager Ding, mother of Murong Sheng
- Quintus Aurelius Symmachus, Roman consul and intellectual
- Sima Yuanxian, regent during the Jin Dynasty (b. 382)
- Tufa Lilugu, prince of the Xianbei state Southern Liang
