= Thermantia =

Roman empress in 408

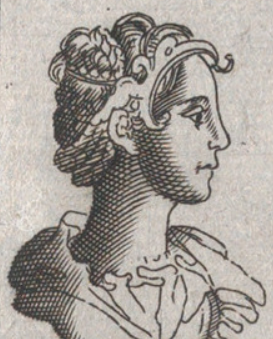
- Imaginary 16th-century portrait from Speculum Romanae Magnificentiae

Empress of the Roman Empire
- Tenure: 408
- Died: 415; Rome
- Burial: Old St. Peter's Basilica
- Spouse: Honorius
Names
- Aemilia Materna Thermantia
- Dynasty: Theodosian
- Father: Stilicho
- Mother: Serena

Aemilia Materna Thermantia (died 415) was the second Empress consort of Honorius, Western Roman Emperor.

== Family ==
She was a daughter of Stilicho, magister militum of the Western Roman Empire, and Serena. Thermantia was a sister of Eucherius and Maria. "De Consulatu Stilichonis" by Claudian reports that her unnamed paternal grandfather was a cavalry officer under Valens, Emperor of the Eastern Roman Empire. Orosius clarifies that her paternal grandfather was a Romanized Vandal. The fragmentary chronicle of John of Antioch, a 7th-century monk tentatively identified with John of the Sedre, Syrian Orthodox Patriarch of Antioch from 641 to 648 calls the grandfather a Scythian, probably following Late Antiquity practice to dub any people inhabiting the Pontic–Caspian steppe as "Scythians", regardless of their language. Jerome calls Stilicho a semi-barbarian, which has been interpreted to mean that Thermantia's unnamed paternal grandmother was a Roman.

The poem "In Praise of Serena" by Claudian and the "Historia Nova" by Zosimus clarify that Thermantia's maternal grandfather was an elder Honorius, a brother to Theodosius I. Both were sons of Count Theodosius and an elder Thermantia, as clarified in the "Historia Romana" by Paul the Deacon.

== Empress ==
Her sister Maria having died some time before, Thermantia became the second wife of Honorius in 408. Her marriage was reported by Zosimus. Zosimus reports that both Honorius and Serena sought this marriage while Stilicho "appeared not to approve of the match". Zosimus considers both sisters to have died as virgins.

=== Peace with Alaric ===
However the wedding would prove short-lived. Stilicho had proposed an alliance with Alaric I of the Visigoths in order to enforce the claims of Honorius to the Praetorian prefecture of Illyricum. At about the time of his daughter's marriage, "Stilicho was informed, that Alaric had left Epirus, and having passed through the defiles that form a passage from Pannonia to Venetia, had pitched his camp at a town called Emo, which is situated between the Pannonia Superior and Noricum. ... Alaric, having marched out of Emo, and crossed the river Aquilis, passed over the Julian Alps, and entered Noricum. The Julian Alps are situated on the borders of Pannonia, and render the way into Noricum very narrow, wherefore, if the pass were guarded by a small number, a large force would find great difficulty in penetrating it. Notwithstanding this difficulty, Alaric advanced through into Noricum, and from thence sent messengers to Stilicho, to desire a sum of money not only in consideration of his stay in Epirus, which he said was made at the persuasion of Stilicho, but also to defray his journey into Noricum and Italy. But Stilicho, although he received the embassy, left those who brought it at Ravenna, and proceeded himself to Rome, with a design to consult the emperor and the senate upon this affair.

"When the senate was assembled at the imperial palace, and deliberated whether to declare war, most of them were disposed for war. Stilicho, and a few others who complied with him merely through fear, were of a contrary opinion, and voted for peace with Alaric. When those who preferred a war desired of Stilicho his reason for choosing peace rather than war, and wherefore, to the dishonour of the Roman name, he was willing basely to purchase it with money, he replied, "Alaric has continued this length of time in Epirus that he may join with me against the emperor of the east, and separating the Illyrians from that dominion, add them to the subjects of Honorius." This, he said, would have been effected before this period, had not letters in the meantime arrived from the emperor Honorius, which deferred the expedition to the east, in expectation of which Alaric had spent so much time in that country. When Stilicho had said these words, he produced an epistle from the emperor, and said that Serena was the occasion of all, wishing to preserve an inviolable friendship between the two emperors. The senate, therefore, imagining that Stilicho spoke nothing but what was reasonable, decreed that Alaric should receive three thousand pounds of silver in consideration of maintaining peace, although most of them gave their voices more in dread of Stilicho than of their own judgment or inclination. For this reason, Lampadius, a person of exalted birth and rank, having uttered this Latin sentence, "Non est ista pax, sed pactio servitutis" ("This is not a peace, but a bond of servitude"), he was compelled, as soon as the senate was dismissed, to fly into a neighbouring church, belonging to the Christians, from the fear of being punished for the freedom with which he had expressed himself."

"Stilicho, after having in this manner made peace with Alaric, prepared very earnestly for his journey, in order to put his designs in execution. The emperor declared, that he would also proceed from Rome to Ravenna, to view and encourage the army, especially as so powerful an enemy was arrived in Italy. Yet this he did not say of his own inclination, but was prompted to it by Serena. For she wished him to reside in a more secure city, that if Alaric should infringe the treaty and attack Rome, he might not take the emperor's person. She was the more zealous for his preservation, since her own security depended on his. Stilicho, however, being much averse to the emperor's journey to Ravenna, contrived many obstacles to prevent it. As the emperor, notwithstanding, would not alter his intentions, but was still determined on his journey, Sarus, a Barbarian, and captain of a company of Barbarians at Ravenna, excited a mutiny before the city at the instigation of Stilicho. His design was not really to throw affairs into confusion, but to deter the emperor from coming to Ravenna. But as the emperor persisted in his resolution, Justinian, an excellent lawyer at Rome, whom Stilico chose as his assistant and counsellor, through the sagacity of his judgment, formed a near conjecture of the design for which the emperor made that journey, and that the soldiers in Ticinum, who were disaffected to Stilicho, when the emperor arrived there, would reduce him into circumstances of great danger. He, therefore, continually advised him to dissuade the emperor from his present intentions. But when Justinian found that the emperor would not listen to the counsel of Stilicho, he forsook him, lest through his familiarity with Stilicho he should share in his misfortunes."

=== Death of Arcadius ===
"Before this juncture a report had been circulated at Rome, that the emperor Arcadius was dead, which was confirmed after the departure of Arcadius for Ravenna. Stilicho being at Ravenna while the emperor was at a city of Aemilia, called Bononia, about seventy miles distant, the emperor sent for him to chastise the soldiers, who mutinied amongst each other by the way. Stilicho, therefore, having collected the mutinous troops together, informed them that the emperor had commanded him to correct them for their disobedience, and to punish them by a decimation, or putting to death every tenth man. At this they were in such consternation, that they burst into tears, and desiring him to have compassion on them, prevailed on him to promise them a pardon from the emperor. The emperor having performed what Stilicho had promised, they applied themselves to public business."

"For Stilicho was desirous of proceeding to the east to undertake the management of the affairs of Theodosius, the son of Arcadius, who was very young, and in want of a guardian. Honorius himself was also inclined to undertake the same journey, with a design to secure the dominions of that emperor. But Stilicho, being displeased at that, and laying before the emperor a calculation of the immense sum of money it would require to defray the expence of such an expedition, deterred him from the enterprise. He likewise observed to him, that the rebellion of Constantine would not admit of his going so far, as not to protect Italy and Rome itself, since that usurper had overrun all Gaul, and then resided at Arles. Moreover, though what he had pointed out was sufficient to deserve the attention and presence of the emperor, Alaric was also approaching with a vast force of Barbarians, who, being a Barbarian and void of faith, when he should find Italy devoid of all aid, would certainly invade it. He, therefore, deemed it the best policy and most conducive to the public advantage, that Alaric should undertake the expedition against the rebel Constantine along with part of his Barbarians and some Roman legions with their officers, who should share in the war. Stilicho added that he himself would proceed to the east, if the emperor desired it, and would give him instructions how to act there."

"The emperor, deceived by these specious representations of Stilicho, gave him letters both to the emperor of the east and to Alaric, and departed from Bononia. But Stilicho remained there, and neither proceeded to the east, nor performed any thing else that was designed. He did not even send over any of the soldiers, who were in Ticinum, to Ravenna or any other place, lest they should meet the emperor by the way, and incite him to do any thing to the prejudice of himself."

=== Conspiracy of Olympius ===
"Stilicho, being in these circumstances, although he was not conscious of any ill intention either against the emperor or the soldiers, Olympius, a native of the vicinity of the Euxine Sea, and an officer of rank in the court-guards, concealed under the disguise of the Christian religion the most atrocious designs in his heart. Being accustomed, because of his affected modesty and gentle demeanor, to converse frequently with the emperor, he used many bitter expressions against Stilicho, and stated, that he was desirous to proceed into the east, from no other motive than to acquire an opportunity of removing the young Theodosius, and of placing the empire in the hands of his own son, Eucherius. These observations he made to the emperor as they were travelling, having then a good opportunity of doing it."

"And when the emperor was at Ticinum, Olympius, accustoming himself to visit the sick soldiers, which was the master-piece of his hypocrisy, dispersed among them, likewise, similar insinuations. When the emperor had been at Ticinum four days, all the soldiers being convened into the court, the emperor appeared before them, and exhorted them to a war against the rebel Constantine. Finding that none of them were moved at any thing relative to Stilicho, Olympius was observed to nod to the soldiers, as if to remind them of what he had said to them in private. At this they were excited almost to madness, and killed Limenius, who was prefect of the court in the nations beyond the Alps, and with him Chariobaudes, the commander of the legions in those parts. For these two had accidentally escaped from the hands of the usurper, and were come to the emperor at Ticinum. Beside these two were slain Vincentius and Salvius, the former, the commander of the cavalry, and the latter of the domestic forces. As the tumult increased, the emperor retired into the palace, and some of the magistrates escaped. The soldiers, then dispersing themselves about the city, killed as many of the magistrates as they could lay hands on, tearing them out of the houses into which they had fled, and plundered all the town. So violent was the commotion, that the emperor, finding the disorder beyond remedy, put on a short mantle, and without either his long robe or his diadem, issuing into the midst of the city, had great difficulty in appeasing and restraining their fury. For those magistrates who were taken, even after their flight, were murdered. Among these were Naemorius commander of the court-bands, Petronius, the treasurer and steward of the emperor's private property, and Salvius, whose office it was to proclaim the intentions of the emperor upon any occasion, which officer had borne the title of Questor from the time of Constantine. Nor could the latter escape death, though he embraced the emperor's knees. The tumult continued till late in the night, and the emperor fearing lest any violence should be committed against his own person also, for which reason he withdrew. They then happened to find Longinianus, the prefect of the court for Italy, whom they put to death. All these magistrates were slain by the infuriated soldiers. There likewise perished so great a number of promiscuous persons as is beyond all computation."

"When intelligence of this reached Stilicho, who was then at Bononia, he was extremely disturbed by it. Summoning, therefore, all the commanders of his confederate Barbarians, who were with him, he proposed a consultation relative to what measures it would be most prudent to adopt. It was agreed with common consent, that if the emperor were killed, which was yet doubtful, all the confederated Barbarians should join together, and fall at once on the Roman soldiers, and by that means afford a warning to all others to use greater moderation and submissiveness. But if the emperor were safe, although the magistrates were cut off, the authors of the tumult were to be brought to condign punishment. Such was the result of the consultation held by Stilicho with his Barbarians. When they knew that no indignity had been offered to the person of the emperor, Stilicho resolved to proceed no further in punishing or correcting the soldiers, but to return to Ravenna. For he reflected both on the number of the soldiers, and that the emperor was not stedfastly his friend. Nor did he think it either honourable or safe to incite Barbarians against the Roman army."

=== Downfall of Stilicho ===
"Stilicho being therefore filled with anxiety concerning these circumstances, the Barbarians who were with him were very desirous of putting in force their former resolutions, and therefore endeavoured to dissuade him from the measures which he afterwards thought proper to be adopted. But being unable to prevail with him, they all determined to remain in some place until they should be better apprized of the emperor's sentiments towards Stilihco, with the exception of Sarus, who excelled all the other confederates in power and rank, and who, accompanied by the Barbarians under his command, having killed all the Huns who formed the guard of Stilicho while they were asleep, and having seized all the carriages that followed him, entered his tent, in which he remained to observe the event. Upon this Stilicho, observing that his Barbarians were quarrelling among each other, hastened to Ravenna, and engaged the cities, in which were any women or children belonging to the Barbarians, not to afford reception to any of the Barbarians if they should come to them."

"In the meantime Olympius, who was now become master of the emperor's inclination, sent, the imperial mandate to the soldiers at Ravenna, ordering them immediately to apprehend Stilicho, and to detain him in prison without fetters. When Stilicho heard this, he took refuge in a Christian church that was near, while it was night. His Barbarians and his other familiars, who, with his servants, were all armed, upon seeing this expected what would ensue. When day appeared, the soldiers, entering the church, swore before the bishop, that they were commanded by the emperor not to kill Stilicho, but to keep him in custody. Being brought out of the church, and in the custody of the soldiers, other letters were delivered by the person who brought the first, in which the punishment of death was denounced against Stilicho, for his crimes against the commonwealth. Thus, while Eucherius, his son, fled towards Rome, Stilico was led to execution. The Barbarians who attended him, with his servants and other friends and relations, of whom there was a vast number, preparing and resolving to rescue him from the stroke, Stilico deterred them from the attempt by all imaginable menaces, and calmly submitted his neck to the sword. He was the most moderate and just of all the men who possessed great authority in his time. For although he was married to the niece of the first Theodosius, was entrusted with the empires of both his sons, and had been a commander twenty-three years, yet he never conferred military rank for money, or coveted the stipend of the soldiers to his own use. Being the father of one only son, he offered to him the office of tribune of the Notarii, and limited him neither to desire nor attempt obtaining any other office or authority. In order that no studious person, or astrologers, maybe ignorant of the time of his death, I shall relate, that it happened in the consulship of Bassus and Philippus, during which the emperor Arcadius submitted to fate, on the twenty-second day of August."

"After the death of Stilico, all the affairs of the court were managed by Olympius at his own pleasure and inclination. He also possessed the office of Magister, or governor of the court, while the other offices were disposed of by the emperor at his recommendation. Meanwhile, not only all the friends of Stilico, but all others who had any regard for him, were searched out. Among these, Duterius, who commanded the guard of the imperial bed-chamber, was examined, as was likewise Petrus, tribune of the Notarii. These were publicly put to the torture to force them to some confession relative to Stilicho; yet as they would state nothing either against him or themselves, Olympius was disappointed of his views. He, however, caused them to be beat to death with cudgels. Although many others, who were suspected of being the adherents of Stilico, and acquainted with his designs, were examined and put to torture to induce them to confess a knowledge of his ambition to be emperor; yet since none of them would make such a confession, the inquirers at length desisted from their enterprise."

=== Divorce of Thermantia ===
"In the mean time, the emperor Honorius commanded his wife Thermantia to be taken from the imperial throne, and to be restored to her mother, who notwithstanding was without suspicion. He likewise ordered Eucherius, the son, of Stilico, to be searched for and put to death. Having found him in a church at Rome, to which he had fled for refuge, they did not molest him, through respect to the place."

In the disturbances that followed, throughout Italy the wives and children of the foederati were slain. The natural consequence of all this was that these men, to the number of 30,000, flocked to the camp of Alaric, clamouring to be led against their cowardly enemies. He accordingly led them across the Julian Alps and, in September 408, stood before the walls of Rome (now with no capable general like Stilicho as a defender) and began a strict blockade.

"Thus if Arsacius and Tarentius, the two eunuchs, had not hastened to bring Eucherius, the son of Stilico, from those quarters to Rome to be executed according to the command of the emperor, the youth would certainly have fallen into the hands of Alaric, and would have been saved. The eunuchs having fulfilled the injunctions laid on them to that effect, and having delivered Thermantia, the wife of Honorius, to her mother, went by sea to the emperor in Gallia Celtica, where he then resided, because they were not able to go to him by the same way they had come. For these reasons, the emperor conceiving that he should render good service to the common-wealth by rewarding these two eunuchs for their great exploits in restoring Thermantia to her mother, and in putting to death Eucherius, appointed Tarentius imperial chamberlain, and gave the next post under him to Arsacius. Having then cut off Bathanarius, who was commander of the troops in the greater Libya, and had married the sister of Stilicho, he gave that command to Heraclianus, the person who had killed Stilicho, and who received this honour as the recompense of his action."

== Death ==
Thermantia is reported to have returned to the custody of her mother in 408. During the prolonged siege of Rome by Alaric, Serena was falsely accused of conspiring with the Visigoths and executed with the approval of her paternal first cousin Galla Placidia. Zosimus does not mentioned the role of Thermantia in the affair. Zosimus was a Pagan and attributes the execution of Serena to divine punishment, for Serena had desecrated a temple of Rhea back in 394. An old woman, the last of the Vestal Virgins, had reportedly placed a curse on Serena and her family.

"When Alaric was near Rome, besieging its inhabitants, the senate suspected Serena of bringing the Barbarians against their city. The whole senate therefore, with Placidia, uterine sister to the emperor, thought it proper that she should suffer death, for being the cause of the present calamity. They observed, that "Alaric, upon Serena being removed, will retire from the city, because no person will remain by whom he can hope the town to be betrayed into his hands." This suspicion was in reality groundless, as Serena never had any such intentions. ... However, the death of Serena did not remove Alaric from the siege, but he blocked up the gates all round, and having possessed himself of the river Tiber, prevented the arrival of necessaries from the port to the city".

The Chronicon Paschale records that news of Thermantia's death reached Constantinople on 30 July 415. She had presumably died months earlier. Her husband never remarried. Honorius died childless in 423.

== Sources ==
- Zosimus, New History. London: Green and Chaplin (1814). Book 5.

Royal titles
Preceded by Maria	Western Roman Empress consort 408	Succeeded by Galla Placidia
