= Battle of Verona (402) =

Roman defeat of Visigoths in Italy

Coordinates: 45.4333°N 10.9833°E

- Part of the Gothic War of 401–403 and Roman–Germanic Wars
Date	June 402
Location	Near Verona, Italy
Result	Roman victory

Belligerents
Western Roman Empire	Visigoths

Commanders and leaders
Stilicho	Alaric I

Strength
10,000	10,000

Casualties and losses
Unknown	Unknown

The Battle of Verona was fought in June 402 by Alaric's Visigoths and a Roman force led by Stilicho. Alaric was defeated and forced to withdraw from Italy.

== Background ==
After securing from Arcadius (Honorius' brother and Emperor of the East) the title of magister militum (Commander in Chief of the Army) of Illyricum in 397, Alaric, King of the Visigoths, immediately began to plan for the invasion of the Western Empire, led by the Roman general of barbarian origin Stilicho, Magister militum of the West.

Alaric invaded Italy in late 401, crossing the Alps and the River Adige, and Stilicho dashed north to bring reinforcements from Gaul for the defence of the emperor's court at Mediolanum (modern Milan). By the time the Magister militum returned he found that Alaric had taken Mediolanum, while Honorius was chased into refuge at Hasta. But before the place could be besieged and the Emperor captured Stilicho finally arrived on the scene, heavily reinforced by barbarians from Germany; Alaric retreated westwards, setting up his camp near Pollentia. Stilicho pursued, and the two armies met at the battle of Pollentia in early April 402, where Alaric was probably badly beaten.

By all accounts, however, the Gothic king emerged from the battle with his cavalry arm intact, and marched south intending to take Rome, undefended while Honorius was celebrating Stilicho's victory. Stilicho followed and intercepted him north of the capital; but instead of risking another battle, he offered Alaric a substantial subsidy in return for the prompt departure of the Goths from Italy. Alaric's chieftains and common soldiers eagerly grasped at so easy a prospect of safety and riches, and Alaric, whose prestige was weakened by defeat, was forced to reluctantly comply, in spite of his hopes of capturing the capital.

In obedience to the treaty Alaric led his army north, and crossed the Po into Gallia Transpadne, closely shadowed by a cautious Stilicho. Once across the river, however, Alaric began plotting a new invasion of the Western Empire, this time across the Rhine into Gaul. Stilicho, kept informed of Alaric's plans and movements by spies within the Gothic camp, considered himself absolved of the treaty, and laid an ambush for the Goths in the mountain passes from Gaul into Rhaetia, which lay on Alaric's proposed route.

== Battle ==
The Goths found themselves trapped in the mountain valleys near Verona, surrounded on all sides by Stilicho's forces. In the battle that ensued, named after the neighbouring city, Alaric's army suffered heavy casualties, though the king himself managed to break through the Roman lines to erect his standard on an adjacent hill, followed by his bravest soldiers. According to Stilicho's critics, Alaric with his reduced army were in sufficiently bad condition at this point as to have easily been exterminated, forever terminating a serious threat to the Roman Empires of East and West. In any case, Alaric was able to escape and straggle over the Alps into Illyricum with the sorry remains of his once-splendid army. For the moment, the Gothic king was thoroughly chastened.

== Aftermath ==
After suffering this reverse, Alaric quickly came to terms with Stilicho's administration, by which Alaric was to return to Honorius' allegiance and aid the western emperor in recovering territory from Arcadius' ministers, who had supposedly usurped these provinces from Stilicho's control. In return, Alaric would receive a subsidy and a military command.

Although the series of Stilicho's victories made a profound impression on the Roman people, which gave itself over to rejoicings and celebrations, especially in the capital, Alaric's ambitions were far from checked, and new threats would soon arise to further damage the unity and strength of the Empire. Stilicho's triumph over Alaric in 402 was followed by a series of disasters which culminated in the Magister militum's disgrace and death in 408. The invasion of Radagaisus at the head of a large Germanic army (405-6), though repelled by Stilicho, was redirected in the next years on Gaul, which was overrun and permanently lost to the Empire. Stilicho was unable to prevent the usurpation of Constantine III in the next year, who conciliated the Germans and thus took control of Britain, Gaul, and Spain. In the year afterward, Stilicho himself fell to the intrigues of Olympius, his rival in the court of Honorius, and was executed at the latter's misguided orders.

Once Stilicho was removed from the scene, the conquest of Rome by Alaric was an easy task. Despite having failed to execute his part of the deal concluded with Stilicho in 403, Alaric crossed the Alps in 409 demanding his promised money and a military position, in what was to all intents and purposes an invasion of Italy. Although Honorius lacked the resources to repel him, he repeatedly refused negotiation, relying on the strong defences of Ravenna, his capital, to preserve the court from the Goths, but leaving Rome undefended. This brought about the war which ended with the siege and Sack of Rome by Alaric in 410.

== Notes ==
- Burns, T. S., Burns, T. S. (1994). Barbarians Within the Gates of Rome: A Study of Roman Military Policy and the Barbarians, Ca.375–425 A.D.. United States: Indiana University Press.
