= In Eutropium =

Panegyric poem by Claudian

In Eutropium is a two-book long panegyric poem and an invective written by the poet Claudian. The poem criticizes Eutropius, an Eastern Roman politician and court eunuch. It attempts to portray Eutropius as a corrupt, ineffective, and effeminate leader through a fictionalized telling of his life. The poem argues that he created a division between the Western and Eastern Roman Empires, and caused numerous problems for the Eastern Empire. Claudian uses this to highlight a contrast between his view of a corrupted and weak Eastern Empire and a powerful and righteous Western Empire.

== Plot ==
The poem begins with Claudian recounting the career of Eutropius, an Eastern Roman politician and court eunuch, who became highly influential in the Imperial court. Claudian claims that Eutropius spent his early years as a catamite, a type of prepubescent male companion in a pederastic relationship in ancient Rome. According to Claudian, Eutropius went on to become a pimp and a lady's maid, before being freed from slavery out of disgust. The poem then discusses his ascent to power, portraying the actions of Eutropius as a ruler, including his campaign in Armenia, as cruel and corrupt. According to Claudian, Eutropius acquired the rank of Consul with the approval of the senate in Constantinople. However, Claudian states that the rest of the Roman world found it to be distasteful. In the text, the goddess Roma begs the Western Emperor Honorius and his general Stilicho to prevent the same fate from befalling the Western empire. Following this speech, due to their disgust at Eutropius, the god Mars and his sister Bellona incite the Greuthungi to revolt. After failing to bribe the rebels, Eutropius is said to have turned to his general Leo, hoping he could end the insurrection. However, the expedition of Leo ends in a military disaster. Afterwards, the goddess Aurora goes to seek Stilicho, appealing to him to intervene and save the Eastern empire.

== Themes ==
Claudian was an ancient Roman poet who lived during the Late Roman Empire and served in the court of Honorius. He was politically opposed to a prominent Eastern Roman politician and consul named Eutropius. Eutropius was a eunuch, a stigmatized characteristic in ancient Rome. Claudian saw him as an effeminate, incompetent, and foreign ruler who polluted the Eastern Empire.

Claudian viewed Eutropius as the scapegoat for all of the issues plaguing the Eastern Roman Empire, and as the sole figure responsible for any disunity between the Western and Eastern Empires. In his poem, Claudian wrote "Why seek to divide the two empires and embroil loving brothers in strife? […] It is for deeds like this that Eutropius demands this year of office, to ensure that by his efforts alone he leaves nothing not dishonored, ruining the army as its general, the court as their judge, the imperial fasti as a consul." These statements were likely an attempt by Claudian to portray Eutropius as fitting the Roman stereotype of a manipulative eunuch that pollutes and destroys. In reality, Eutropius lacked juridical power over the courts, and had been successful in his campaigns against the Huns.

Claudian associated eunuchs, and therefore Eutropius, with foreign cultures. Claudian claimed that an Assyrian queen known as Semiramis invented the practice of castration to disguise her sex by surrounding herself with effeminate men. He also wrote that castration before puberty was a Parthian custom, used to "serve their lusts by thus lengthening the years of youthful charm." From the perspective of the Roman deity Roma, who was a character in his poem, Claudian stated that Roma had: “long learned to tolerate" eunuchs, “ever since the court exalted itself with Arsacid pomp and the example of Parthia corrupted our morals.” Historically, Eutropius was castrated by an Armenian slave dealer and sold in an Assyrian slave market. Within the poem, Claudian has Roma compare Eutropius to Pothinus, an ancient Ptolemaic eunuch responsible for the assassination of Roman general Pompey the Great. Roma states: "The slaves of Egypt’s kings have ever been a curse to the world; behold I suffer from a worse than Pothinus and bear a wrong more flagrant than that of which Egypt was once the scene. Pothinus’ sword at Alexandria spilled the blood of a single consul; Eutropius brings dishonor on us all." Eutropius' status as a former slave was also subject to criticism. In another section of the poem, Claudian compared the regret the people of the Eastern Empire supposedly felt at letting themselves be ruled over by a slave to the myth of Agave. In this myth, Agave, a follower of the god Dionysus, murders her son Pentheus whilst in a bacchic frenzy, after he had outlawed the worship of Dionysus in his city of Thebes.

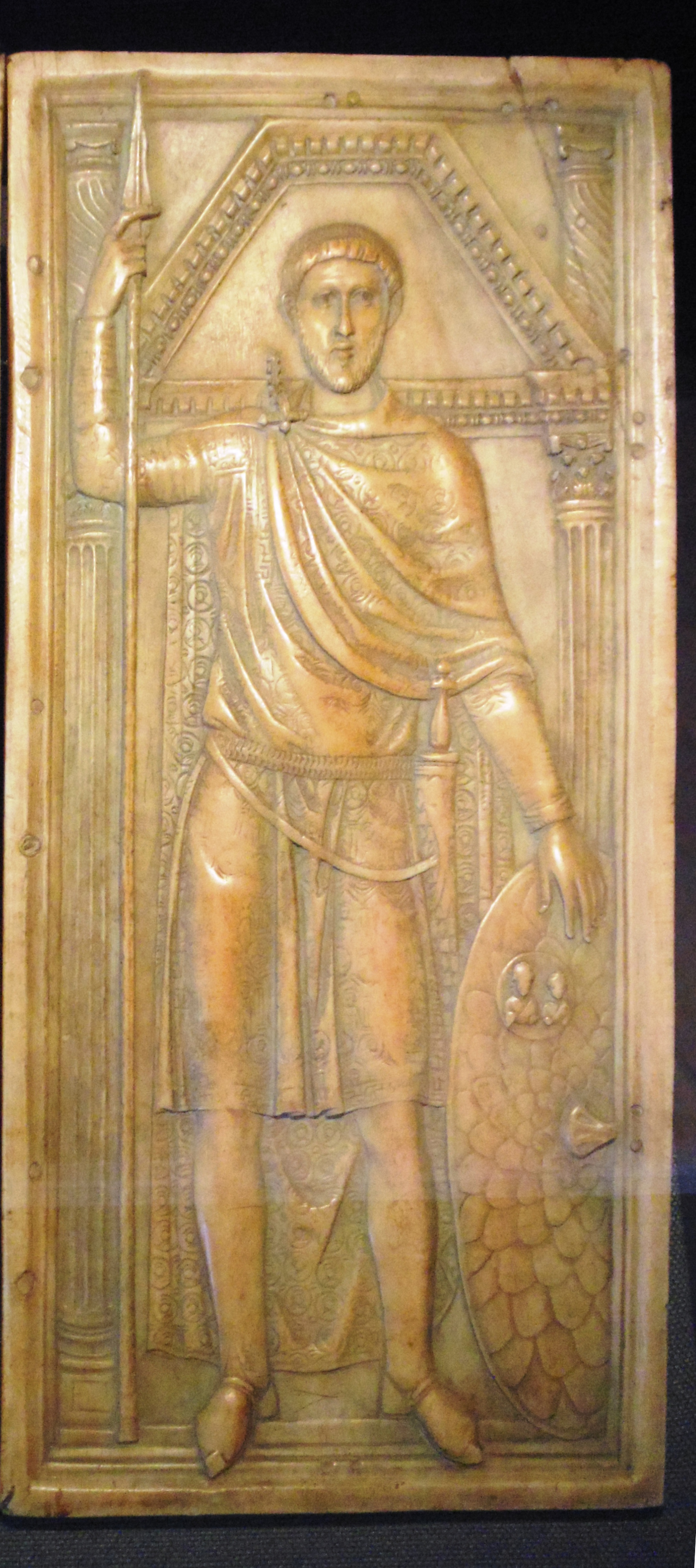
Diptich of the general Flavius Stilicho

Claudian considered Eutropius to be an effeminate figure. Claudian wrote: "O shame to heaven and earth! Our cities behold an old woman decked in a consul’s robe who gives a woman’s name to the year." Claudian also criticized Eutropius for having a "feminine" triumph in Constantinople; he believed that Eutropius acted like an old dame who was traveling to see their daughter-in-law. Eutropius is frequently described as neither a man nor a woman. Roma describes eunuchs as an "Unhappy band…whom the male sex has discarded and the female will not adopt."

He critiques Eutropius for his important role in the military of the Eastern Empire, considering him too effeminate to run an army, claiming that he should have taken up spinning instead. According to Claudian, the enemies of Rome rejoiced as a eunuch was in charge of Rome, stating that they "felt that at last we were lacking in men." Claudian describes the goddess Roma speaking to the Western Emperor Honorius, praising the martial strength of the Western Empire, and criticizing the Eastern Empire for effeminacy, claiming that the Eastern Empire is used to having women as rulers.

Claudian attempts to establish a dichotomy between the martial prowess of the Western Roman Empire and a supposed effeminate and weak Eastern Roman military. The deities Mars and his sister, Bellona, are characters in his poem. Claudian writes that Mars addressed Bellona, demanding that they work towards "curing the East of effeminacy" and praising a Western Roman general named Stilicho for protecting and upholding the power and strength of Rome, keeping it "unsullied by an unheard of crime" as he was "heedful of the empire and of the character and morals of a past age." Following this conversation, Bellona heads to meet Tribigild, the leader of a tribe known as the Greuthungi, whilst disguised as his wife. Bellona urged him to revolt against Eutropius. Historically, the Greuthungi did revolt against the Eastern Empire under the administration of Eutropius. Claudian was likely attempting to portray Eutropius as the sole reason for this revolt.

Claudian believed that an influential Western Roman general named Flavius Stilicho was the only individual capable of protecting and uniting both the Western and Eastern Empires. He viewed Eutropius as an enemy who prevented Stilicho from accomplishing these goals. He portrays Stilicho as the protector of Honorius and Arcadius, the two children of Emperor Theodosius and the emperors of the Western and Eastern Roman Empires respectively. He uses the analogy of children calling for their father's aid in times of distress to describe the situation of the Roman Empire. The children are likely a metaphor for either the people of the empires or Honorius and Arcadius themselves, with Stilicho being the father protecting them from the numerous threats facing the Late Roman Empire. Using the character of Roma, Claudian encourages Stilicho to take military action against Eutropius. Claudian wrote, "Why, Stilicho, dost thou delay to conquer because ashamed to fight [against a eunuch]?" Claudian portrays Stilicho as the savior of the east. He states that the people of the Eastern Empire look to him as they "look as to a star amid this universal shipwreck of war; to him innocent and guilty alike address their prayers." Claudian describes the goddess Aurora traveling to Italy, grasping Stilicho's "victorious hand" and asking him to take action against Eutropius. Aurora claims that Eutropius is maintaining a division between the two Roman Empires, and his elimination would permit the two empires to function as a cohesive unit.
