= Serena (wife of Stilicho) =

Wife of Stilicho

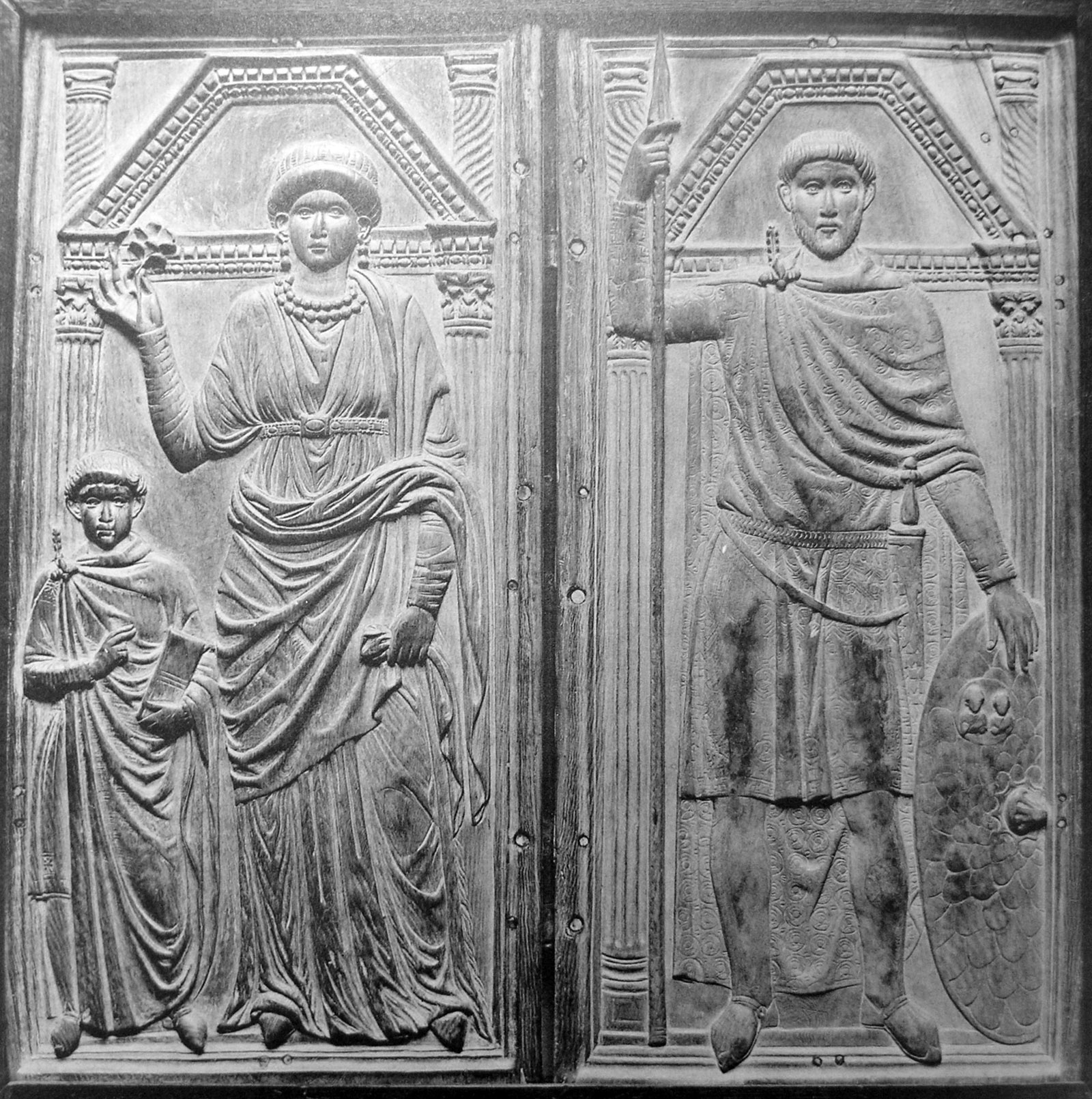
- Serena portrayed with her husband Stilicho and son Eucherius, c. 400 (Monza Cathedral). It may instead depict the family of Aetius.
- Born: before 379; Hispania
- Died: 408; Rome, Italy
- Spouse: Stilicho
- Issue: Eucherius; Maria; Thermantia
- Dynasty: Theodosian
- Father: Honorius
- Mother: Maria (presumed)
- Religion: Christianity

Serena (died 408) was a member of the Theodosian dynasty as the niece of the emperor Theodosius I, as well as the wife of the military commander Stilicho.

== Family ==
Serena was the daughter of Honorius, the brother of Theodosius I and son of Theodosius the Elder, and her mother's name is presumed to be Maria. She had an elder sister named Thermantia. Serena's father died prior to 379, after which she was adopted by her uncle Theodosius.

Around the year 384, she was married to the general Stilicho. The poet Claudian stated that the union had been arranged by Theodosius due to Stilicho's military capability; some modern scholars contend that, as Stilicho was relatively undistinguished at the time, it is more likely that Serena herself had chosen to marry the general. The couple had a son, Eucherius, and two daughters, Maria and Thermantia, respectively the first and second wives of the emperor Honorius.

== Life ==
A resident at the court of Honorius, Serena selected a bride for Claudian, and took care of Honorius' half-sister Galla Placidia.

Zosimus reported that during Theodosius I's visit to Rome in 394, Serena, a Christian, took a necklace from a statue of Rhea Silvia and placed it on her own neck. An old woman, the last of the Vestal Virgins, appeared, rebuking Serena and calling down punishment upon her for her act of impiety. Serena was then subject to dreadful dreams predicting her own untimely death. Alan Cameron and John Matthews are both skeptical of the entire tale, believing that Theodosius' reported visit to Rome should be rejected.

Honorius had Stilicho and Eucherius executed in 408. In the following year Serena was falsely accused of conspiring with the Visigoths besieging Rome, and was executed with Galla Placidia's consent.

== Bibliography ==
- Atanasov, Georgi (2014). "The portrait of Flavius Aetius (390–454) from Durostorum (Silistra) inscribed on a consular diptych form Monza". Studia Academia Sumenensia. (1): 7-21.
- Cameron, Alan (1970). Claudian: Poetry and Propaganda at the Court of Honorius. Clarendon. ISBN 978-0-1981-4351-2.
- Cameron, Alan (2010). The Last Pagans of Rome. Oxford University Press. ISBN 978-0-19-974727-6.
- Hughes, Ian (2010). Stilicho: The Vandal Who Saved Rome. Barnsley: Pen & Sword Military. ISBN 978-1-84415-969-7.
- Martindale, John R.; Jones, A. H. M.; Morris, John, eds. (1971). The Prosopography of the Later Roman Empire: Volume I, AD 260–395. Cambridge: Cambridge University Press. ISBN 0-521-07233-6.
- Matthews, John (1975). Western Aristocracies and Imperial Court, A.D. 364–425. Oxford: Clarendon Press. ISBN 978-0-19-814499-1.
- O’Flynn, John M. (1983). Generalissimos of the Western Roman Empire. University of Alberta Press. ISBN 0-88864-031-5.
