= Jabez Hughes =

English translator

- Born: 1685?
- Died: January 17, 1731
- Occupations: Translator, Clerk
- Known for: Translations of Claudian, Lucan, Suetonius, and Cervantes
- Notable work: The Rape of Proserpine (1714), Lives of the XII Cæsars (1717)
- Spouse: Sarah Hughes
- Children: 1 daughter
- Relatives: John Hughes (brother)

Jabez Hughes (1685?–1731) was an English translator.

== Life ==
Hughes was a younger son of John Hughes, clerk in the Hand-in-Hand Fire Office, Snow Hill, London, and his wife Anne Burges, daughter of Isaac Burges of Wiltshire. He was the younger brother of John Hughes.

Hughes was for some years one of the receiver's clerks in the stamp office. He died on 17 January 1731, in the forty-sixth year of his age, leaving a widow, who accompanied the wife of Robert Byng to Barbados, and died there in 1740, and left an only daughter.

== Works ==
Hughes translated:

- 'The Rape of Proserpine, from Claudian, in three books, with the Story of Sextus and Erichtho from Lucan's Pharsalia, book 6' (London, 1714; another edition, corrected and enlarged, with notes, 1723);
- Suetonius's 'Lives of the XII Cæsars,' with notes (London, 1717, 12mo, 2 vols.);

and several novels from the Spanish of Cervantes, which were published anonymously in Samuel Croxall's 'Select Collection of Novels and Histories' (second edition, London, 1729, six vols.)

His 'Miscellanies in Verse and Prose' were collected by his brother-in-law, William Duncombe, and published for the benefit of his widow in 1737 (London). The dedication to the Duchess of Bedford, though signed by his widow, 'Sarah Hughes,' was written by John Copping, dean of Clogher. Two short pieces written by Hughes are given in John Nichols's 'Select Collection of Poems' (1780), vi. 39–40.
