= Claudian =

Roman poet (c. 370 – c. 404)

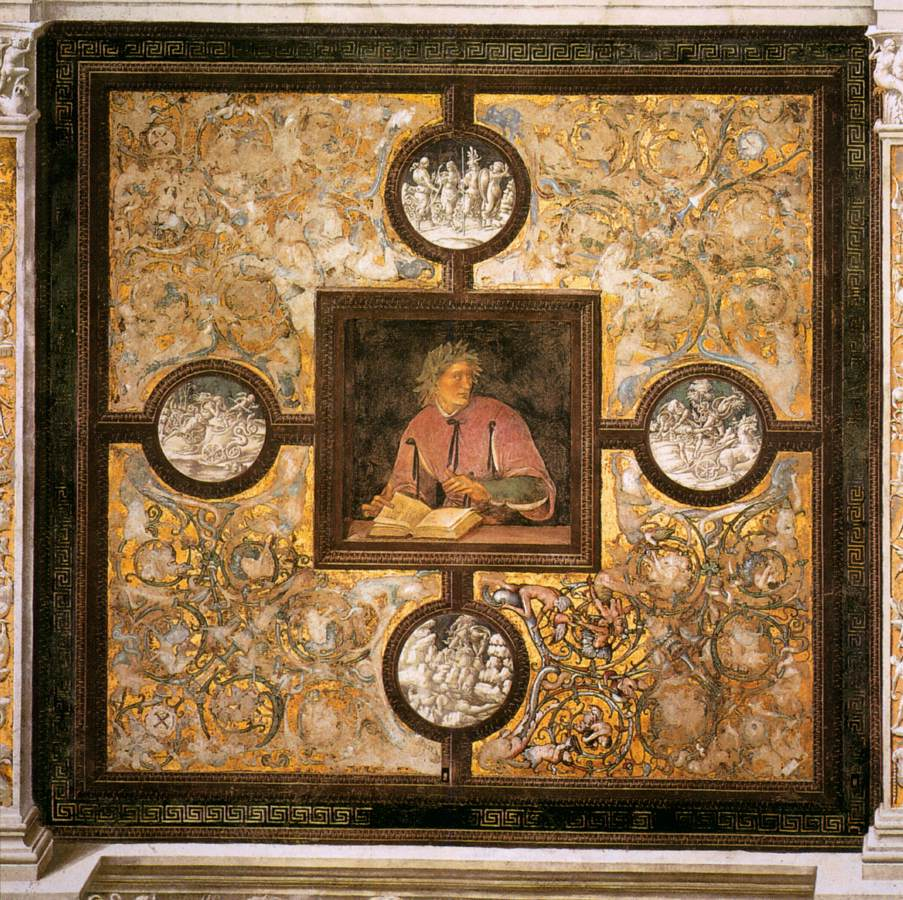
- Born: c. 370; Alexandria, Roman Empire
- Died: c. 404
- Occupations: poet, writer
- Notable work: De raptu Proserpinae

Claudius Claudianus, known in English as Claudian (Greek: Κλαυδιανός; c. 370 – c. 404 AD), was a Latin poet associated with the court of the Roman emperor Honorius at Mediolanum (Milan), and particularly with the general Stilicho. His work, written almost entirely in hexameters or elegiac couplets, falls into three main categories: poems for Honorius, poems for Stilicho, and mythological epic.

== Life ==
Claudian was born in Alexandria. He arrived in Rome in 394 and made his mark as a court poet with a eulogy of his two young patrons, Probinus and Olybrius, consuls of 395. He wrote a number of panegyrics on the consulship of his patrons, praise poems for the deeds of the general Stilicho, and invectives directed at Stilicho's rivals in the Eastern court of Arcadius.

Little is known about his personal life, but it seems he was a convinced pagan: Augustine refers to him as "foreign to the name of Christ" (Civitas Dei, V, 26), and Paul Orosius describes him as an "obstinate pagan" (paganus pervicacissimus) in his Adversus paganos historiarum libri septem (VII, 55).

He was well rewarded for his political engagement, being granted the rank of vir illustris. The Roman Senate honored him with a statue in the Roman Forum in 400. Stilicho's wife, Serena, secured a rich wife for him.

Scholars assume Claudian died in 404, for none of his poems record the achievements of Stilicho after that year. His works give no account of the sack of Rome, while the writings of Olympiodorus of Thebes have been edited and made known only in few fragments, which begin from the death of Stilicho.

== As poet ==
Although a native speaker of Greek, Claudian is one of the best Latin poetry stylists of late antiquity. He is not usually ranked among the top tier of Latin poets, but his writing is elegant, he tells a story well, and his polemical passages occasionally attain an unmatchable level of entertaining vitriol. The literature of his time is generally characterized by a quality modern critics find specious, of which Claudian's work is not free, and some find him cold and unfeeling.

Claudian's poetry is a valuable historical source, though distorted by the conventions of panegyric. The historical or political poems connected with Stilicho have a manuscript tradition separate from the rest of his work, an indication that they were likely published as an independent collection, perhaps by Stilicho himself after Claudian's death.

His most important non-political work is an unfinished epic, De raptu Proserpinae ("The Abduction of Proserpina"). The three extant books are believed to have been written in 395 and 397. In the 20th and early 21st centuries, Claudian has not been among the most popular Latin poets of antiquity, but the epic De raptu influenced painting and poetry for centuries.

== Works ==
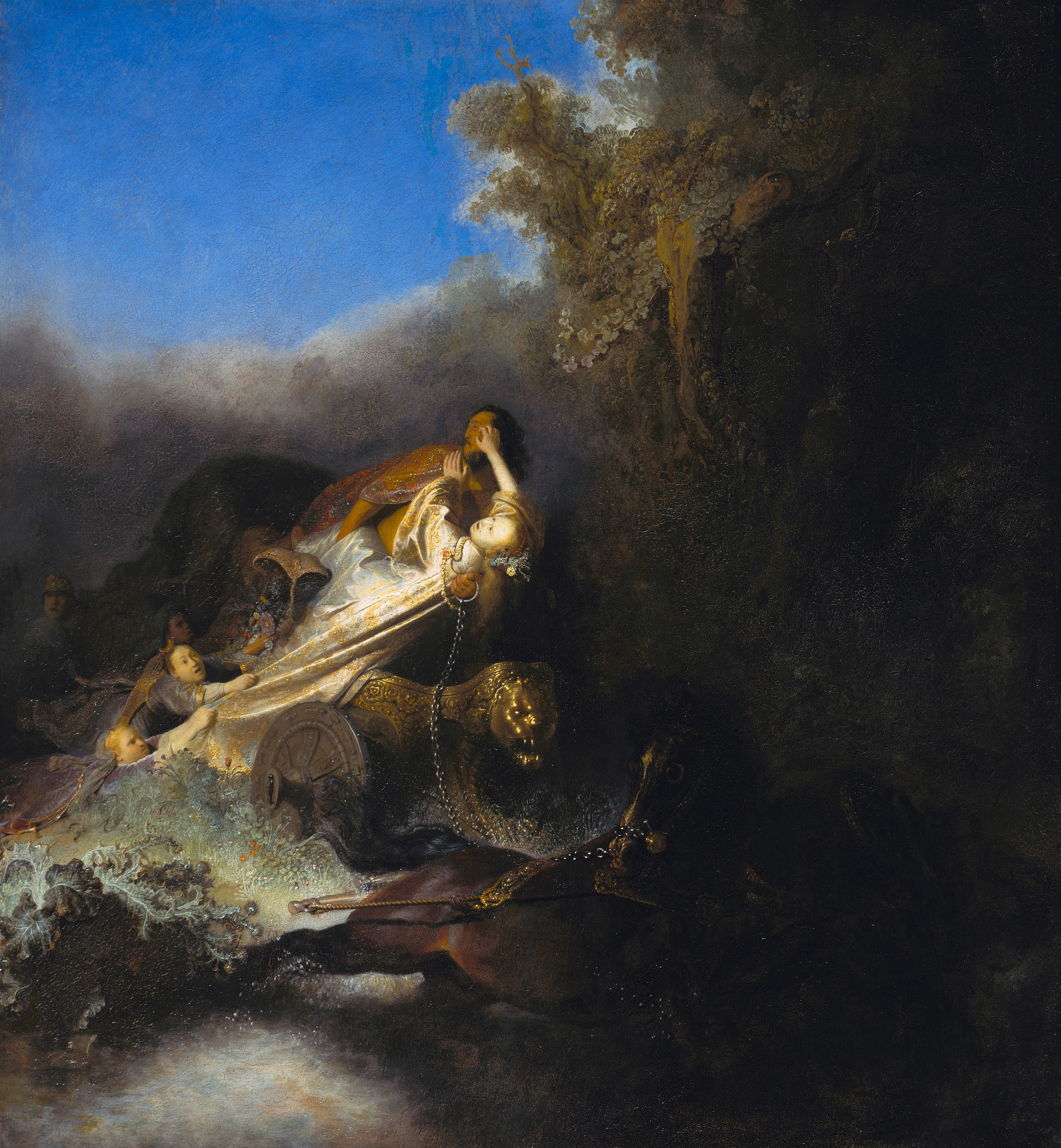
The Abduction of Proserpina (ca. 1631) by Rembrandt was influenced by Claudian's De raptu Proserpinae

- Panegyricus dictus Probino et Olybrio consulibus
- De raptu Proserpinae (unfinished epic, 3 books completed)
- In Rufinum ("Against Rufinus")
- De Bello Gildonico ("On the Gildonic War")
- In Eutropium ("Against Eutropius")
- Fescennina / Epithalamium de Nuptiis Honorii Augusti
- Panegyricus de Tertio Consulatu Honorii Augusti
- Panegyricus de Quarto Consulatu Honorii Augusti
- Panegyricus de Consulatu Flavii Manlii Theodori
- De Consulatu Stilichonis
- Panegyricus de Sexto Consulatu Honorii Augusti
- De Bello Gothico ("On the Gothic War" of 402–403)
- Gigantomachy
- Epigrams
- Lesser poems: Phoenix, Epithalamium Palladio et Celerinae; de Magnete; de Crystallo cui aqua inerat

== Editions and translations ==
- Hall, J.B.. Claudian, De raptu Proserpinae (Cambridge University Press, 1969).
- Dewar, Michael, editor and translator. Claudian Panegyricus de Sexto Consulatu Honorii Augusti (Oxford Clarendon Press, 1996).
- Slavitt, David R., translator. Broken Columns: Two Roman Epic Fragments: The Achilleid of Publius Papinius Statius and The Rape of Proserpine of Claudius Claudianus, with an Afterword by David Konstan (Philadelphia: University of Pennsylvania Press, 1997).
- Gruzelier, Claire, editor (translation, introduction, commentary). Claudian, De raptu Proserpinae (Oxford Clarendon Press, 1997).
- Baier, Thomas and Anne Friedrich, Claudianus. Der Raub der Proserpina, edition, translation and commentary (Darmstadt: WBG (Wissenschaftliche Buchgesellschaft), 2009), Edition Antike.
- English verse translations of Claudian online:
  - A. Hawkin's 1817 translation (rhymed couplet) via Google Books.
  - Helen Waddell's 1976 translation of two Epigrams in "More Latin lyrics, from Virgil to Milton", ed. Felicitas Corrigan (NY: Norton). (Internet Archive)
  - The rape of Proserpine: with other poems, from Claudian (1814). Translated into English blank verse, with a prefatory discourse, and occasional notes. By Jacob George Strutt (Internet Archive).
  - The rape of Proserpine: a poem in three books (1854). Translated by Henry Edward John Howard (1795–1868) (Internet Archive).
  - The rape of Proserpine (1714). With the story of Sextus and Erichtho, from the Pharsalia of Lucan. Translated by Jabez Hughes (c. 1685 – 1731) (Internet Archive).

== See also ==
- Allegory in the Middle Ages
- Classical Latin
- Late Latin
- Latin poetry
