= Zosimus (historian) =

Late 5th/early 6th century Byzantine historian

Zosimus (Ancient Greek: Ζώσιμος [ˈzosimos]; fl. 490s–510s) was a Byzantine Greek historian who lived in Constantinople during the reign of the eastern Roman Emperor Anastasius I (491–518). According to Photius, he was a comes, and held the office of "advocate" of the imperial treasury. Zosimus was also known for condemning Constantine’s rejection of the traditional polytheistic religion.

Little more is known about the life of Zosimus except that he was Greek and a pagan. He was not a contemporary of the events of his books.

== Historia Nova ==
Zosimus' Historia Nova (Ἱστορία Νέα, "New History") is written in Greek in six books and covers the period from 238 to 410 A.D. It was written at the end of the fifth century. For the period from 238 to 270, he apparently uses Dexippus; for the period from 270 to 404, Eunapius; and after 407, Olympiodorus.

His dependence on his sources is clear from the change in tone and style between the Eunapian and Olympiodoran sections, and by the gap left in between them. In the Eunapian section, for example, he is critical of Stilicho; in the Olympiodoran section, he offers precise figures and transliterations from the Latin, and approves Stilicho.

The first book sketches briefly the history of the early Roman emperors from Augustus to Diocletian (305); the second, third and fourth deal more fully with the period from the accession of Constantius Chlorus and Galerius to the death of Theodosius I; the fifth and sixth cover the period between 395 and 410, when Priscus Attalus was deposed; for this period, he is the most important surviving non-ecclesiastical source. The work, which breaks off abruptly in the summer of 410 at the beginning of the sixth book, is believed to have been written in 498–518.

The style is characterized by Photius as concise, clear and pure. The historian's object was to account for the decline of the Roman Empire from a pagan point of view. Zosimus is the only surviving non-Christian source for much of what he reports.

In contrast to Polybius, who had narrated the rise of the Roman Empire, Zosimus documented the events and causes which led to its decline. Though the decline of the Roman Empire was Zosimus' primary subject, he also discussed events connected with Persian and Greek history, perhaps in imitation of Polybius. It is likely that part of the work has been lost, or that he did not live to complete it, since it does not cover all the matters that Zosimus himself tells us he intended to discuss. It is clear that Photius and Evagrius did not have any more of Zosimus' work than what survives today. It has been conjectured, without much probability, that the monks and other ecclesiastics succeeded in suppressing that portion of the work in which the evil influences of their bodies were to be more especially touched upon. If the work was indeed left incomplete that circumstance would account for some carelessness of style which is here and there apparent. However, Photius thought that the work, in the form in which he saw it, was a second edition, but he may have been misled by the title Historia Nova. In what sense the work is a new history is not quite clear. Photius remarks that he had not seen the first edition.

Zosimus was a pagan, and does not spare the characters of the Christian emperors. In consequence his credibility has been fiercely assailed by several Christian writers. The question does not, as has sometimes been supposed, turn upon the credibility of the historians whom Zosimus followed, for he did not adhere in all cases to their judgment with respect to events and characters. For instance, although Zosimus followed Eunapius for the period 270–404, he entirely differed from Eunapius in his account of Stilicho and Serena. Of post-medieval writers, Caesar Baronius, Lelio Bisciola, Kaspar von Barth, Johann Daniel Ritter, Richard Bentley, and G. E. M. de Ste. Croix, have been disparaging. Bentley in particular speaks of Zosimus with great contempt. On the other hand, his authority as an historian has been maintained by Leunclavius, G. B. von Schirach, J. Matth. Schrockh, and Reitemeier. Zosimus is said to have lost his advocatus fisci position in the imperial treasury because of his pagan leanings which explains his bitterness in writing.

Zosimus’ work contains errors of fact, such as wrongly reporting that all three of Constantine’s successors were not the sons of his wife Fausta. Edward Gibbon judged him as “unworthy of esteem and trust,” “poor in judgment,” and “a disingenuous liar.” Ludwig Mendelssohn observed that, “The more familiar one becomes with Zosimus, the more one learns to distrust him.”

=== Editions ===
The editio princeps (first printed edition) of Zosimus' history was the Latin translation of Leunclavius, accompanied by a defence of the historian (Basel, 1576, fol.). The first two books, in Greek, with the translation of Leunclavius, were printed by H. Stephanus, in his edition of Herodian (Paris, 1581). The first complete edition of the Greek text of Zosimus was that by F. Sylburg (Scriptores Hist. Rom. Min., vol. iii., Frankfurt, 1590). Later editions are those published at Oxford (1679), at Zeitz and Jena, edited by Cellarius, with annotations of his own and others (1679, 1713, 1729). The next edition is that by Reitemeier, who, though he consulted no fresh manuscripts, made good use of the critical remarks of Heyne and other scholars (Leipzig, 1784). Bekker produced a reliable edition in 1837 at Bonn. There is a German translation by Seybold and Heyler, and also an English and a French translation. (Schöll, Gesch. d. Griech. Lit. vol. iii, p. 232; Fabric. Bibl. Graec. vol. viii. p. 62.)

The single good manuscript, in the Vatican Library (MS Vat. Gr. 156), was unavailable to scholars until the mid-19th century, although it lacks the conclusion of the first book and the beginning of the second. Ludwig Mendelssohn (Leipzig 1887) edited the first dependable text. The modern standard edition is F. Paschoud Zosime: Histoire Nouvelle (Paris 1971) which has a French translation, introduction and commentary. A later edition in English, Zosimus: New History a translation with commentary by Ronald T. Ridley, was published in 1982 by the Australian Association of Byzantine Studies.

== See also ==
- Historic recurrence

== Sources ==
- Goffart, Walter (1971). "Zosimus, The First Historian of Rome's Fall". The American Historical Review. 76 (2): 412–441. doi:10.2307/1858706. JSTOR 1858706.
- Potter, David S. (2004). The Roman Empire at Bay: AD 180–395. New York: Routledge. ISBN 0-415-10057-7.
