= Sarus campaign against Constantine III =

- Part of Roman civil war of 407–415
- Situation during Sarus Campaign
| Date | 407-408 |
| Location | Gallia Lugdunensis |
| Result | victory Constantine III |

Belligerents
| Honorius | Constantine III |

Commanders and leaders
| Stilicho; Sarus | Justinianus; Nebiogastes; Gerontius; Edobichus |

Strength
| ± 5,000 | 20,000-25,000 |

Sarus campaign against Constantine III took place in 407. It was Stilicho’s reaction to the rapid takeover of power by Constantine III in the Roman civil war of 407–415. The campaign was initially successful, but ended in a defeat.

== Background ==
In early 407, Constantine III crossed from Britain to the mainland to establish his authority in Gaul and Hispania. The timing for his seizure of power was favorable: the Rhine border had collapsed, while Honorius' authority was weakened and fragmented. Within a short time, Constantine managed to establish himself in Valence, a strategically located city on the Rhône, which gave him control over the Gallic field army. His performance was characterized by speed and decisiveness.

In the north, he restored the situation along the Rhine, not so much by military force, but mainly by a combination of diplomacy and integration of local power groups. He renewed treaties with Frankish and other Germanic leaders, including Burgundians and Alemannians. These groups were not expelled, but reinstated into the Roman army. At the same time, Constantine managed to gain the support of the Gallo-Roman elite, thereby controlling both military and political Gaul. At the same time, he sent envoys to the Hispania to legitimize his position. What began as a military uprising developed within a few months into a serious alternative regime of the Western Roman Empire.

=== Advance of Constantine ===
The chronology of these events remains a subject of discussion and is related to Constantine's relationship with the government of Honorius. An important merit of Drinkwater is that he has made the route of Constantine's advance to Gaul from Bononia transparent based on numismatic material. The available evidence, especially the distribution of his earliest coins, suggests that Constantine initially moved neither directly to the Rhineland nor to the Rhone valley. Instead, he marched to Lugdunum (Lyon), where his first coins were minted and where the temporary seat of the Pretorian Prefecture of Gaul was located. From there he marched to Valence, a well-defensible city, near Arles which he would later make his political center in 408.

=== Stilicho's strategy ===
In Italy, the commander-in-chief of the army and regent of the minor emperor Honorius, was surprised by the sudden advance of Constantine. In northern Italy he had a powerful field army, but it was bound to its task of protecting Italy, the heart of the West Roman Empire. The recently ended war against Radegaisus had made it clear how vulnerable Italy was. Moreover, north of the Alps in Pannonia was located the army of Alarik, consisting mainly of Goths, which was now a formal ally, but in reality was an uncertain factor. With this unreliable ally, Stilicho did not dare to use his main force. Nor could he count on support from the Eastern Roman Empire, as relations between the two parts of the empire were tense. Given these limited possibilities, Stilicho could only deploy part of his army. The objective was therefore aimed at disrupting Constantijns' build-up of power in order to gain time for gathering a full-fledged army. It had to be prevented that Arles, the capital of the Pretorian Prefecture of Gaul came into the hands of Constantine and that the Alpine Passes were manned by his troops.

== Sarus campaign ==
=== Army strength ===
Instead of a large-scale offensive, Stilicho chose a mobile intervention force with Sarus, a Gothic general who had proven himself in war against Radagaisus, as commander. It probably consisted of several thousand men, possibly no more than about 5,000. According to Zosimus, this army initially achieved rapid success. That indicates a flexible and mobile operating force, composed of experienced elite units, supplemented by Gothic and other barbarian troops recruited from Sarus's own base.

Constantijns' army is also missing exact numbers, however, modern research makes it clear that his force must have been considerably larger than the original British expeditionary force. The rapid overflow of parts of the Gallic army and the support of allies suggest an effective military capacity of possibly 20,000-25,000 men or more.

=== Cause of the Sarus campaign ===
Around the middle of 407, Sarus entered Gaul, at a time when Constantine's regime had not yet fully crystallized. In line with his assignment, Sarus tried to disrupt the usurper's military and administrative network before it was completed. Initially, the campaign was successful. Sarus defeated an army of Constantine under the command of the magistri militum Justinianus and Nebiogastes. Justinian was killed during the fighting, while Nebiogastes was captured and murdered. He then besieged Valence where the usurper stayed and struck the siege for the city. However after seven days, the battle turned in favor of Constantine. With the arrival of an auxiliary army under Edobichus and Gerontius Sarus forced to lift the siege and to withdraw.

=== Retreat ===
The continuation of the campaign is briefly noted in the sources, the retreat must have been difficult. According to Zosimus, Sarus was confronted with hostile groups and even had to pay them to get passage. Wijnendaele sees reasons to consider these groups as Roman limitaes that had transferred to Constantijn.

== Epilogue ==
The failure of Sarus campaign meant the actual recognition that Constantine III was no longer a local British usurper, but a power factor that had to be taken into account from now on. The defeat also undermined the prestige of Stilicho, whose cautious strategy was increasingly seen as indecisive within parts of the army and court. The failure of Sarus led to increasing tension within the Western Roman army that would eventually lead to the fall of Stilicho in August 408, and the rebellion of Alaric's army with the proclamation of Priscus Attalus as emperor.

== Sources ==
- Orosius, Historiae Adversum Paganos
- Zosimus, Historia Nova
- Olympiodorus, Fragments
- Sozomenus, Historia Ecclesiastica

== Bibliography ==
- Bury, J.B. (1958), History of the Later Roman Empire, Dover edition.
- Drinkwater, J.F. (1998). "The Usurpers Constantine III (407-411) and Jovinus (411-413)". Britannia. 29: 269–298. JSTOR 526818.
- Heather, Peter (2006). The Fall of the Roman Empire: A New History of Rome and the Barbarians (2nd ed.). New York: Oxford University Press. ISBN 0-19-515954-3.
- Jones, Arnold Hugh Martin; Martindale, John Robert; Morris, John (1971). The Prosopography of the Later Roman Empire, Part 2. Cambridge University Press. ISBN 0-521-20159-4
- Kulikowski, Michael (1998). The End of Roman Spain (PhD thesis). University of Toronto. ISBN 9780612339071.
- Kulikowski, Michael (2000). "Barbarians in Gaul, Usurpers in Britain". Britannia. 31. Society for the Promotion of Roman Studies: 325–345 JSTOR 526925. doi:10.2307/526925. JSTOR 526925. S2CID 162663612.
- Kulikowski, Michael (2006). Rome's Gothic Wars: From the Third Century to Alaric (Thesis). Cambridge and New York: Cambridge University Press. ISBN 978-0-521-84633-2.
- Wijnendaele (2019), Sarus the Goth: from imperialcommander to warlord in: Early Medieval Europe pp. 469-493, John Wiley & Sons Ltd. 156.
