= Turpilio =

Turpilio (died 409) was a Roman military commander, a Magister peditum.

At the recommendation of his superior officer, Olympius, the emperor Honorius appointed Turpilio to be Magister equitum after the removal and execution of the emperor's kinsman Stilicho (Honorius had first given the office to Varanes).

Following the downfall of Olympius (409), Turpilio was removed from office and sent into exile, where he was murdered by the members of his escort.
