= Edobichus =

Edobichus (Greek: Ἐδόβιχος or Ἐδόβιγχος; died 411) was a general of the Roman usurper Constantine III. Although he was a native of Britain, according to Zosimus his ancestors were Franks.

== Life ==
After the deaths of the generals Nebiogastes and Iustinianus in 407, the Western usurper Constantine III appointed Edobichus and Gerontius as his magistri militum (commanders-in-chief of the army). Upon their promotions, they forced Sarus, the general of the Western Emperor Honorius, to end his siege of Constantine in Valence and retreat into Italy.

However Gerontius decided to betray Constantine, and in 409 he proclaimed Maximus as emperor in Hispania. Upon hearing of this development, Constantine sent Edobichus to the Franks and the Germanic tribes across the Rhine to raise reinforcements. Meanwhile, Gerontius invaded southern Gaul, found Constantine at Arles, and laid siege to the city until the Imperial general Constantius arrived on the scene and forced him to retreat.

Despite being besieged now by Constantius, Constantine continued to hold Arles, having heard that Edobichus was nearby with the barbarian troops. When Edobichus crossed the Rhone with his troops, he encountered Constantius' force blocking his path. As he prepared to engage the Imperial force, Ulphilas fell upon his soldiers from behind and defeated them. Edobichus managed to flee the battlefield on horseback and fled to one Ecdicius who he believed was his friend. However Ecdicius, seeking a reward from Constantius slew Edobichus and brought his head to Constantius, but the Imperial general rewarded him only with praise. Edobichus' death convinced Constantine to end his resistance, and the usurper took priestly vows before surrendering to the general Constantius.

== See also ==
- Battle of Arles (411)

== Further sources ==
- Gregory of Tours, Historia Francorum, II.9.
- Martindale, John R., ed. (1980). "Edobichus". The Prosopography of the Later Roman Empire: Volume II, AD 395–527. Cambridge: Cambridge University Press. p. 386. ISBN 0-521-20159-4.
