= Battle of Arles (411) =

- Part of Roman civil war of 407–415
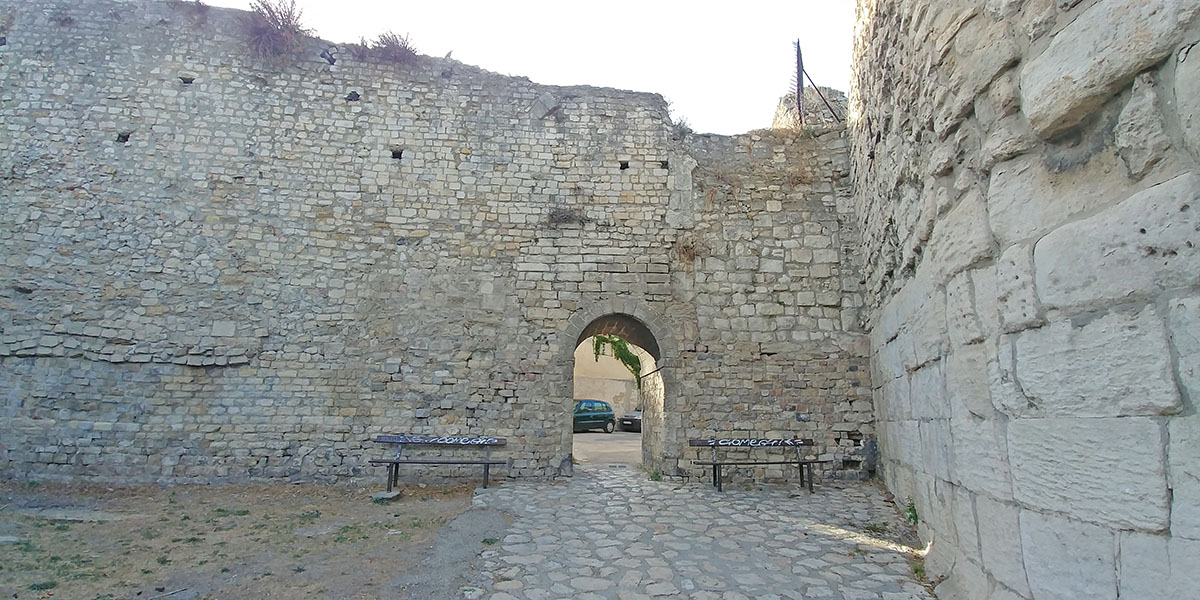
- Roman citywall of Arles
Date	summer 411
Location	north of Arles, present France
Result	victory of Honorius

Belligerents
Constantine III	Honorius

Commanders and leaders
Edobichus; Justus	Constantius III

Strength
±10,000-20,000	20,000-28,000

The so-called battle of Arles was an episode of the Roman civil war of 407–415 in which several military confrontations took place between different opponents and with changing targets. The siege of the city of Arles was central to this. The fighting armies were on the one hand the army of Emperor Constantine III against his former general Gerontius (first phase of the conflict), and the imperial army of Honorius against an army under command of general Edobichus, consisting mainly of Germanic auxiliary troops (second phase). The conflict started at the end of 410–beginning of 411 and ended with a battle north of the city halfway through 411. Honorius' army triumphed.

== Sources ==
The main source for these events is Olympiodorus of Thebes, fragments of his history have been preserved through later Photius I. Additional information can be found at Sozomen and Zosimus. Modern reconstructions are based on works by A.H.M. Jones, Peter Heather and Guy Halsall.

== Background ==
Constantine III of Rome, the British usurper who had controlled Gaul and Hispania since 407, faced an unexpected rebellion by his general Gerontius in Hispania in 410. At that time he was in Italy, where he was campaigning in an attempt to depose Emperor Honorius. He instructed his son Constans, together with an army under the command of a general named Justus, to suppress Gerontius. The details of the events are unclear, it is only certain that Constans failed and returned to Arles in the spring of 410. Around the same time, Constantine also returned after a failed invasion of Italy. Due to the difficulties caused by the Goths there, he considered the threat of Gerontius to be a much greater danger.

== The course of the battle ==
Army displacements and acts of war (410–411)

=== Confrontation between Constans and Gerontius ===
Constantine sent his general Edobichus north with the order to recruit additional troops, while Constans again moved to Spain to confront Gerontius with a new army. Here, too, the details are scarce, but probably Gerontius marched simultaneously to Arles with his army. The armies met somewhere halfway (the location is unknown) and fought, defeating Constans. He fled north with the remnants of his army, hoping to join the reinforcements of Edobichus. Gerontius overtook him at Vienne, probably early 411, defeated him again and killed Constans. After this victory, Gerontius' army marched to Arles, where he besieged the residence of Constantine.

=== Expedition of Edobichus to the Rhine region ===
Edobichus probably left Arles in the winter of 410–411 and moved through the Rhone Valley to North Gaul and the Rhine region. There he acquired an army of allies outside the regular Roman army, which was composed for the most part of Franks and Alemannics. Gathering this army took the necessary time because of the need for negotiations involved and preparations for the march back to the south.

=== Coming of the Imperial Army ===
While Edobichus was absent, the military situation changed dramatically. From Italy, an imperial army approached on behalf of Honorius under the command of magister militum Constantius III. There is no clear description of a battle, the decision seems to have been made because the troops of Gerontius overflowed en masse to Constantine. Presumably the imperial army was so large that the morale of the besiegers collapsed before or during a first confrontation. Gerontius was defeated and fled to Spain with some faithful. Constantius then took over the siege of Arles, leaving Constantine still trapped, but now by imperial troops.

=== Battle north of Arles ===
In the summer of 411, Edobichus returned to South Gaul with his newly formed army. Before he could reach Arles and unite with the besieged, he was intercepted by Constantius. Constantine was aware of his arrival and did not want to let it come to a battle before the walls of Arles. The route that Ebodichus followed was almost certainly along the Via Agrippa along the Rhône, where Constantius took a strategically favorable position and prepared a trap.

The army of Edobichus was ambushed and was defeated in the subsequent battle. The army, consisting largely of Germanic mercenaries, did not prove to be up to the imperial forces. Edobichus initially managed to escape, but was killed soon after, possibly after betrayal by a local landowner, as mentioned in the fragments of Olympiodorus of Thebes.

== Consequences ==
The victory of Constantius III had direct and far-reaching consequences for the political and military situation in the Western Roman Empire. It led to the immediate elimination of Gerontius as a power factor, resulting in his flight to Hispania and subsequent death. Subsequently, the defeat of Edobichus put an end to the last attempt to defeat Constantine III. Without the external support of his troops and facing a strong imperial army, this led to his surrender. He was captured and executed during his transfer to Italy. The fall of Constantine III eventually led to a power vacuum in Gaul, which was filled with the proclamation of Jovinus as emperor in northern Gaul.

== Sources ==
- Sozomenen, Historia Ecclesiastica
- Zosimus, Historia Nova

== Bibliography ==
- Burns, T. S. (1994). Barbarians Within the Gates of Rome: A Study of Roman Military Policy and the Barbarians, ca. 375–425. Bloomington: Indiana University Press. ISBN 978-0-2533-1288-4.
- Bury, J. B. (1889). A History of the Later Roman Empire of Arcadius to Irene. Vol. I. Macmillan.
- Drinkwater, J.F. (1998). "The Usurpers Constantine III (407-411) and Jovinus (411-413)". Britannia. 29: 269–298. JSTOR 526818.
- Jones, A.H.M.; Martindale, J. R.; Morris, J (1971). The Prosopography of the Later Roman Empire. Cambridge University Press.
- Kulikowski, Michael (2000). "Barbarians in Gaul, Usurpers in Britain". Britannia. 31. Society for the Promotion of Roman Studies: 325–345 JSTOR 526925. doi:10.2307/526925. JSTOR 526925. S2CID 162663612.
- Syvänne, Iikka (2020). Military history of the late Rome (395-425). Yorkshire, PA: Pen and Sword Military.
