= Varanes (consul 410) =

Varanes (floruit 393–410) was a politician and general of the Western and Eastern Roman Empires.

== Biography ==
His name suggests a Persian origin. In 393, Varanes was at the court in Constantinople. He probably followed Emperor Theodosius I to the West in 394, in his war against the usurper Eugenius. He remained there, after Theodosius' death, under his son and successor Honorius.

In 408, after the death of Stilicho (August 22), he was appointed Magister peditum, but a little later his office was given to the Magister equitum Turpilio. The following year he was again in Constantinople, where he probably had received the office of Magister militum praesentalis; on this occasion, he suppressed a popular revolt caused by a food shortage. He had the collaboration of Arsacius and Synesius.

He was appointed Consul for the year 410, without colleague. That year Rome was besieged by the Visigoths of Alaric I, who would eventually sack the city; the usurper Priscus Attalus chose Tertullus as consul, but neither the Western Emperor Honorius nor the Eastern court of Theodosius II recognised him.

== Bibliography ==
- Martindale, John R., ed. (1980). "Varanes 1". The Prosopography of the Later Roman Empire: Volume II, AD 395–527. Cambridge: Cambridge University Press. pp. 1149–1150. ISBN 0-521-20159-4.

Preceded by Imp. Caesar Flavius Honorius Augustus IX, Imp. Caesar Flavius Theodosius Augustus III	Consul of the Roman Empire; 410 with Tertullus (in Rome, unrecognized)	Succeeded by Imp. Caesar Flavius Theodosius Augustus IV
