= Iustinianus (magister militum in Gaul) =

Roman military commander

Iustinianus (died 407 AD) was a Roman military commander who supported the usurper Constantine III.

== Life ==
Iustinianus was an officer of the Western Roman army in Britain. In 407 the general Claudius Constantine (Constantine III) rebelled against Emperor Honorius and appointed Iustinianus and Nebiogastes magistri militum of the army of Gaul. Constantine crossed the Channel and attacked the troops loyal to Honorius in Gaul. Iustinianus fought against Sarus, one of Honorius' generals, but was defeated and killed.

== See also ==
- Sarus campaign against Constantine III

== Sources ==
- Olympiodorus of Thebes, fragment 12.
- Zosimus, VI.2.2-3.
- Martindale, John R., ed. (1980). The Prosopography of the Later Roman Empire: Volume II, AD 395–527. Cambridge: Cambridge University Press. ISBN 0-521-20159-4.
