= Olympius =

Late Roman politician

Olympius (died 410/411) was a minister of the Western Roman Empire, in the court of the emperor Honorius (reigned 393–423). Olympius orchestrated the fall and execution of the capable general Stilicho, who had effectively been ruling the Western Roman Empire as regent of Honorius for over twelve years.

Germanic tribes invaded Italy in 405. Honorius and the court took refuge in Ravenna, now the capital of the Western Roman Empire. Stilicho defeated the invaders in the mountains of Fæsulæ (Fiesole) near modern-day Florence. The Vandals, Alani, and Suevi poured over the Rhine into the interior of Gaul, followed by Franks, Burgundians, and Alemanni, who settled permanently on the left bank of the Rhine. Stilicho entered into negotiations with Alaric, holding out promises of Eastern Illyria to secure his aid. Thereupon the Roman general Constantine, who had crossed over from Britain, appeared in Gaul, and proclaimed himself Emperor. The negotiations with Alaric failed and Alaric demanded an indemnity of 4000 pounds in gold; Stilicho, who had twice saved Italy from barbarian incursion, was suspected by the court of entertaining treasonable plans. The weak-willed Honorius listened to the insinuations of the chancellor Olympius and proceeded to have Stilicho and his family put to immediate execution.

After Stilicho's execution, Olympius prompted Honorius to take a more hostile stance toward the Goths, mostly notably Alaric I, who had previously been cooperating with the Romans. Olympius, through Honorius, orchestrated the massacre of tens of thousands of wives and children of Goths serving in the Roman military. Subsequently, around 30,000 Gothic soldiers defected to Alaric and took part in the first sack of Rome in 800 years, a key event in the fall of the Western Roman Empire.

When Constantius, who had been a friend and supporter of Stilicho, became magister militum in 410/11, he had Olympius clubbed to death.

== See also ==
- Ancient Rome: The Rise and Fall of an Empire
