= Battle of Faesulae (406) =

Battle between Romans and Goths

- Part of the War of Radagaisus and Roman–Germanic Wars
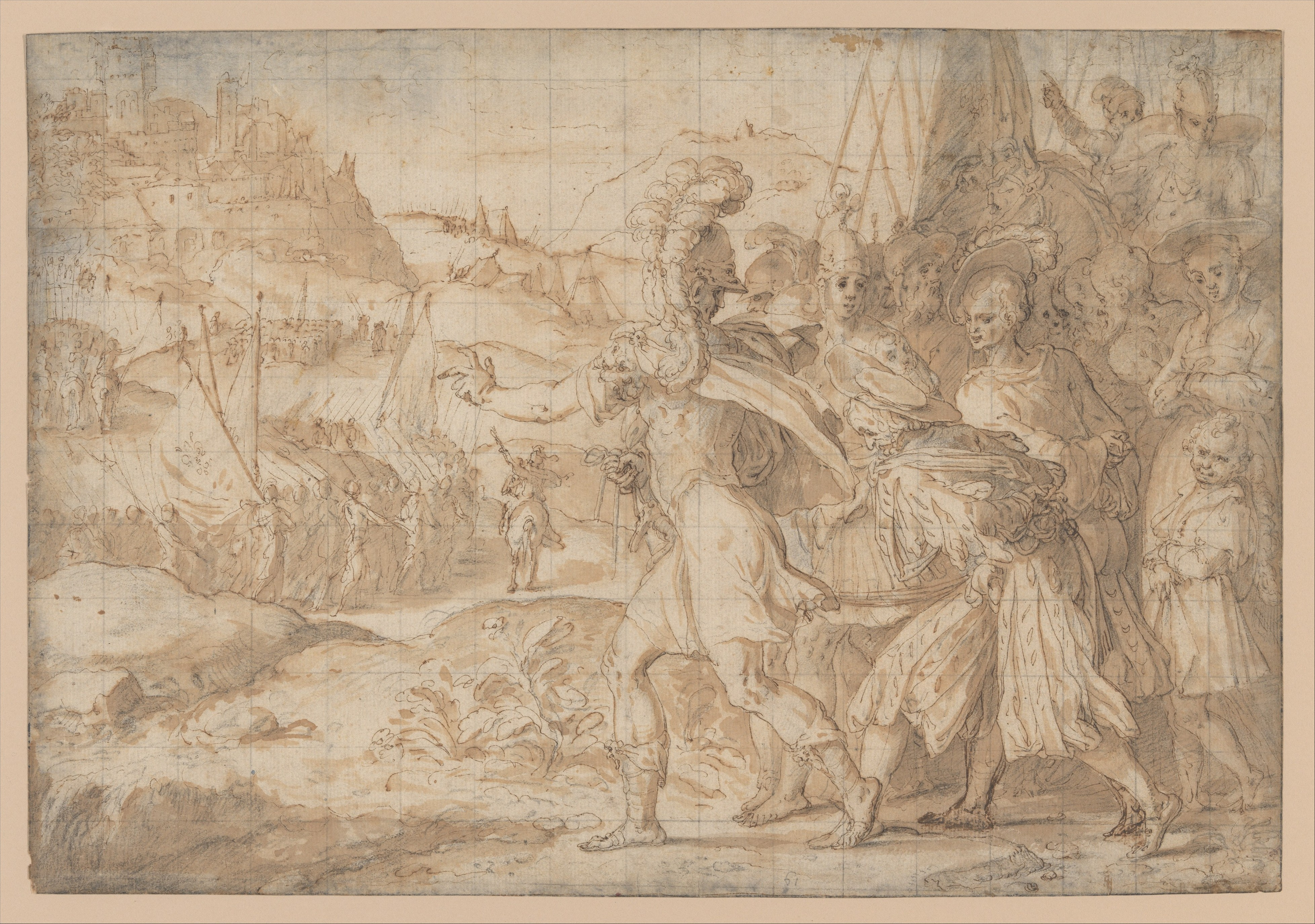
- The Siege of Fiesole by the Goths, Friedrich Sustris
Date	406
Location	Faesulae (modern Fiesole, Italy)
Result	Roman victory

Belligerents
Western Roman Empire; Huns; Goths	Goths; Vandals

Commanders and leaders
Stilicho; Uldin the Hun; Sarus the Goth	Radagaisus (executed)

Strength
15,000–20,000	20,000

Casualties and losses
Unknown (negligible)	12,000+ captured

The Battle of Faesulae was fought in 406 as part of the War of Radagaisus between the Goths and the Western Roman Empire. After General Flavius Stilicho repelled the Visigoths at Pollentia and Verona, he encountered a new incursion of Vandals and Goths led by Radagaisus whose forces attacked Florence. Stilicho ultimately defeated the invaders at Faesulae (modern Fiesole) with support from Uldin the Hun and Sarus the Goth. Radagaisus was executed after the battle and survivors of his armies fled to Alaric.

== Background ==
In late 405 or early 406, King Radagaisus crossed the Alps and marched into Italy with a large Germanic and Alani force. After overrunning the undefended Raetia and northern Italy, heavily devastating the fertile countryside, they halted to besiege Florence, only 180 miles north of Rome. Stilicho, Master-General of the west, hastily gathered forces for the defense of Italy, enrolling in his service a tribe of the Alani, and numbers of the Goths under Sarus and the Huns under Uldin, his army amounting to some 20,000 Romans and Foederati soldiers. Radagaisus, by comparison, who likewise had in his army miscellaneous detachments of Goths and Alani, had as many as 20,000 barbarian warriors at his back, amounting, together with wives, slaves, and children, to between 50,000 and 100,000.

== Battle ==
While Stilicho had been collecting his army, the small garrison of Florence had held out against the vast army encamped outside their walls. As soon as Stilicho arrived with his army of relief, he contrived to smuggle desperately needed supplies and reinforcements into the beleaguered city. But instead of attempting to crush Radagaisus' army in an open battle, Stilicho adopted a more lengthy, though ultimately successful, course of action. After surrounding the barbarians with rudimentary entrenchments, he brought in thousands of the native people to aid in the construction of a more systematic entrenchment of the lines enclosing Radagisus' camp. Although the barbarians made repeated efforts to break out while the work was still in progress, the Romans were able to repulse every attempt due to a lack of proper coordination amongst Radagaisus' forces, whose assaults were individual to each band and made in small numbers. After the lines of circumvallation were completed Radagaisus admitted the hopelessness of his situation, trapped as he was in the midst of enemy territory with no provisions and a vast number of non-combatants in need of subsistence. On August 23 he left his camp to capitulate in the tent of Stilicho. Though he had been promised equitable terms, or even an equal alliance by Stilicho, the latter immediately proceeded to behead him, thus emerging supremely victorious and being once again hailed as the "savior of Italy".

== Bibliography ==
- Hughes, Ian (2015). Stilicho: The Vandal Who Saved Rome. South Yorkshire, England: Pen & Sword Military. ISBN 978-1-47382-900-8.
