= Sarus the Goth =

Gothic Chieftain

Sarus or Saurus (d. 413 AD) was a Gothic chieftain known as a particularly brave and skillful warrior. He became a commander for the Emperor Honorius. He was known for his hostility to the prominent Gothic brothers-in-law Alaric I and Athaulf, and was the brother of Sigeric, who briefly ruled the Goths in 415.

== War against Radagaisus ==
Nothing is known of his life before he came to prominence in 406, when he commanded a force of Gothic troops along with other barbarian foederati against the invasion of Italy by Radagaisus in 405–6 (War of Radagaisus). Roman and foederati forces eventually defeated the invaders at the Battle of Faesulae.

According to Wijnendaele, the arrival of Sarus can be explained on the scene by connecting him to one of the three groups in which Radagaisus' army was divided. His army force consisted of two divisions, one of Goths and the other of Alans and Vandals. Wijnendaele bases his hypothesis on a mysterious sentence in the report of Orosius in which Sarus and Uldin are mentioned as leaders of the Goths and Huns and of which Orosius says: "who were still enemies before". Uldin was captain of the Hunnic auxiliary troops who joined the army of Stilicho. On this basis Wijnendaele suggests that Sarus and his men surrendered to Stilicho in Faesulae, and were then deployed by him to help defeat Radagaisus' division while he besieged Florence.

Heather also argues that behind Stilicho's acquisition of 12,000 of Radagaisus' best warriors "lies a significant diplomatic coup, because with the Roman army it was not unusual to buy opponents. Orosius' account of the events contains clues that point to this. Just before his description of Radagaisus' invasion of Italy, Orosius adds a crucial but often overlooked remark: “I will not say anything about the deadly battles between the barbarians, when two divisions of the Goths, and then the Alans and the Huns, destroyed each other in several massacres.” We have no further details of where, when or why these massacres occurred.

== War against Constantine III ==
In 407 Sarus was chief in the campaign against the British usurper Constantine III. First he defeated and killed Iustinianus, one of Constantine's magistri militum, then he tricked and killed the other, Nebiogastes. Sarus then besieged Constantine himself in Valentia, but fled back to Italy at the approach of Constantine's new generals Edobichus and Gerontius, and was forced to surrender all his booty to the Bacaudae (late Roman bandits or rebels) for passage across the Alps. Since he must have commanded an army, he may have been appointed magister militum (general) for this expedition; elsewhere he is said to have had a following or warband of only about three hundred.

Early in 408, while commanding a force of barbarians at Ravenna, Stilicho induced him to mutiny in an attempt to prevent Honorius from traveling there. Then, when Stilicho was recalled by the emperor on suspicion of treason, Sarus, apparently angry that Stilicho continued to obey orders and refused to use the available barbarian troops for defense, fought his way through Stilicho's Hun bodyguard in protest. Later in 408, after Stilicho's fall, Sarus' name was put forward as Stilicho's successor as the most suitable candidate for the office of magister militum in praesenti (supreme commander), but the Emperor Honorius refused to promote him. It is possible that his resentment of Honorius, as evidenced by later actions, began here.

We next hear of Sarus in 410, apparently living independently in the Picenum region. Athaulf, coming to join his brother-in-law Alaric, decided to attack him in passing, and Sarus, thinking that his force of three hundred would be no match for the Gothic army, fled to Honorius. Later that year, while Alaric was negotiating with Honorius near Ravenna, Sarus attacked him with his warband, apparently on his own initiative. This caused Alaric to finally abandon the negotiations and sack Rome on August 24.

== Death and aftermath ==
Sarus seems to have remained in the emperor's service for the next two years, but he developed a grudge against Honorius for failing to investigate or avenge the murder of his servant. In 412, another usurper, Jovinus, approached from northern Gaul, initially supported by Ataulf; Sarus went to join Jovinus. Sarus had only twenty-eight men with him, but Ataulf gathered a force of ten thousand to ambush him. Despite this, Sarus fought with remarkable courage and was barely taken alive before being killed.

Sarus' final contributions to the events of the time were posthumous. Ataulf had been foolish enough to take one of Sarus' followers into his own service; this man waited until Ataulf visited his stable alone and killed him there (September 415). Sarus' brother, Sigeric, then ruled for seven days before Wallia killed him and took over the kingship.

Sarus was active for only six years during a time of great turmoil, but he is remembered as a figure of some importance in many of the major and minor events of those years. Unfortunately, a mere account of his deeds gives a very disjointed picture of him, but he obviously made an impression on those of his time, who describe him as "a brave and invincible warrior", possessing "marvelous heroism", who "excelled all the other confederates in power and rank", and possessing "intrepidity" and "experience in warlike affairs".
