= Constantine III (Western Roman emperor) =

Roman emperor from 407 to 411

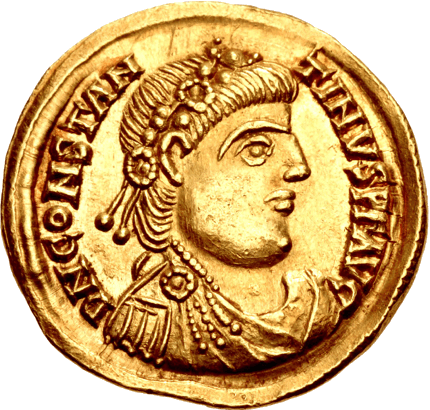
- Gold Solidus of Constantine III

Roman emperor
- Reign: c. 407–411 AD
- Predecessor: Honorius
- Successor: Honorius
- Alongside: Honorius (409–411); Constans II (409–411)
- Born: c. 4th century AD
- Died: c. 411 AD (before 18 September)
- Issue: Constans II; Julian
Regnal name
- Flavius Claudius Constantinus
- Religion: Nicene Christianity

Constantine III (Note: There is particular confusion surrounding the name "Constantine III" as it has also been applied to the later Eastern emperor Heraclius Constantine.) (Latin: Flavius Claudius Constantinus; died shortly before 18 September 411 AD) was a common Roman soldier who was declared emperor in Roman Britain in 407 and established himself in Gaul. He was recognised as co-emperor of the Roman Empire from 409 until 411.

Constantine rose to power from within the field army of Roman Britain and was acclaimed emperor in early 407. He promptly moved to Gaul (modern France), taking all of the mobile troops from Britain, with their commander Gerontius, to confront bands of Germanic invaders who had crossed the Rhine the previous winter. With a mixture of fighting and diplomacy Constantine stabilised the situation and established control over Gaul and Hispania (modern Spain and Portugal), establishing his capital at Arles. The sitting emperor of the Western Roman Empire, Honorius, sent an army under Sarus the Goth to expel Constantine's forces. After initial victories, Sarus was repulsed. In Hispania, Honorius's relatives rose and expelled Constantine's administration. Constantine raised his oldest son to co-emperor as Constans II and sent him with an army to deal with this. When little progress was made, he sent his general Gerontius with additional troops, after which Constantine's authority was re-established. In early 409 Honorius recognised Constantine as co-emperor. In 409 Gerontius rebelled, proclaimed his client Maximus emperor and incited barbarian groups in Gaul to rise up. Constans was sent to quash the revolt, but was defeated and withdrew to Arles. Meanwhile, Constantine invaded northern Italy, but his plan failed and he also pulled back to Arles. In 410 Constans was sent to Hispania again. Gerontius had strengthened his army with Germanic tribesmen and defeated Constans; the latter retreated north and was defeated again and killed at Vienne early in 411. Gerontius then besieged Constantine in Arles. Honorius appointed a new general, Constantius, who arrived at Arles while Gerontius was outside the city. Much of Gerontius's army deserted to Constantius, who took over the siege. A force attempting to relieve Constantine was ambushed. Constantine abdicated, took holy orders and – promised his life – surrendered. Constantius had lied: Constantine was killed and his head presented to Honorius on a pole.

== Background ==
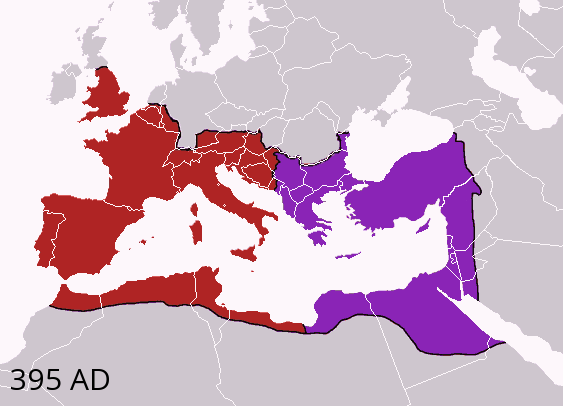
The Western and Eastern Roman Empires at the death of Theodosius I in 395

Following the death of the Roman emperor Theodosius I in 395 the Roman Empire was divided between his two sons: Arcadius became emperor of the Eastern Roman Empire and ten-year-old Honorius of the Western. Honorius was underage and the leading general Stilicho became hugely influential and the de facto commander-in-chief of the Roman armies in the west.

During this period Roman Britain was suffering raids by the Scoti, Saxons and Picts. Sometime between 396 and 398 Stilicho is said by contemporary poet and speech writer Claudian to have ordered a campaign against the Picts, probably a naval campaign intended to suppress their seaborne raids on the east coast of Roman Britain. He may also have ordered campaigns against the Scoti and Saxons. Other interpretations suggest it went badly, or that troops defending Roman Britain defeated a Pictish invasion without external support. This is the last recorded Roman military campaign in Britain. Stilicho sent funds to strengthen the defences along Hadrian's Wall and the coastal defences at about the same time.

In 401 or 402 Stilicho needed military manpower for wars with the Visigoths and the Ostrogoths and so stripped Hadrian's Wall of troops. The year 402 is the last date from which Roman coinage is found in large quantities in Britain, suggesting the Empire was no longer paying the troops who remained. Meanwhile, the Picts, Saxons and Scoti continued their raids, which may have increased in scope. In 405 the Irish king Niall of the Nine Hostages is described as having raided along the southern coast of Britain.

Both the Eastern and Western Empires were suffering from incursions of large groups from Germanic tribes, whom the Romans referred to generically as "barbarians". In 406 a group of Alans and Goths led by Radagaisus invaded Italy. The group included women and children and is estimated to have been 90,000–100,000 strong, of whom more than 20,000 were fighting men. For six months they devastated northern Italy, capturing and sacking several cities. After concentrating his forces, Stilicho caught the Goths while they were besieging Florentia (modern Florence) and defeated them at the Battle of Faesulae; 12,000 prisoners joined the Roman army and so many captives were sold that the market in slaves collapsed. The Western Empire's problems with barbarian intruders were far from over, however.

== Life ==
Little is known of Constantine before he was declared emperor. His date and place of birth are unknown, as is his marital status. He had two sons, although their names prior to being given more regal-sounding ones are likewise unknown. Regarding his personal habits, one fifth-century historian described him as a glutton and another considered that his major flaw was being inconstant in his policies.

=== Rise ===
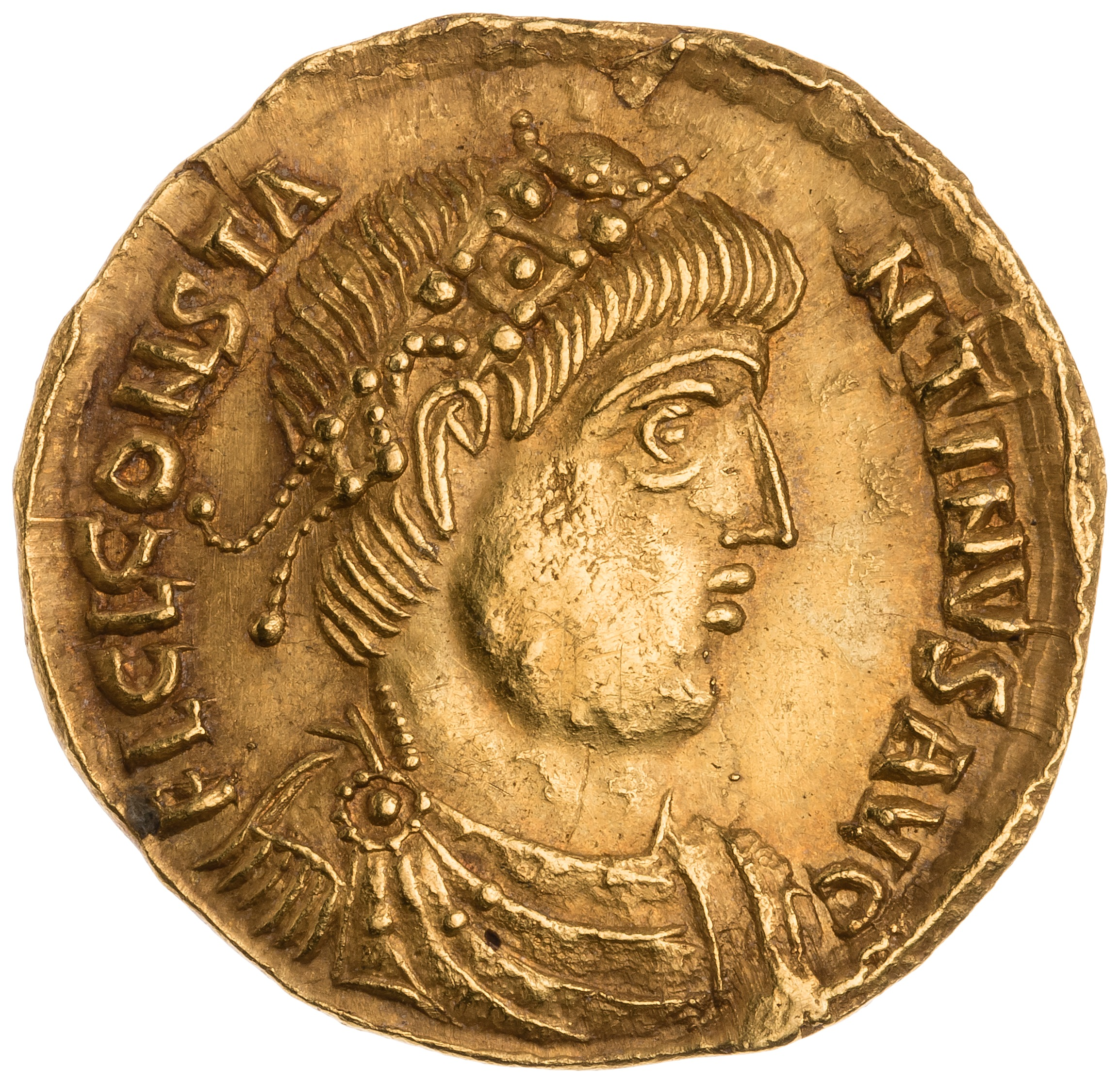
Solidus of Constantine with the legend: fl cl constantinus aug

In 406, the approximately 6,000 troops of the Roman field army based in Roman Britain were dissatisfied. (Note: The ancient historian Zosimus gave the army's main features as "insolence and irascibility".) They had not been paid for several years, a large contingent had left to fight on the continent four years earlier and had not returned, the coastal defences had been dismantled to form the new field army and their commander had been replaced. They revolted and determined to choose their own leader. Their first choice was a man named Marcus, whom they appointed emperor. After a short period, unhappy with his performance, they killed him and appointed Gratian. He also failed to meet the troops' expectations and was killed after four months. On 31 December 406 several tribes of barbarian invaders, including the Vandals, Sueves and Alans crossed the Rhine, perhaps near Mainz, and overran the Roman defensive works in a successful invasion of the Western Roman Empire. (Note: It may have been a transfer of troops from the Rhine frontier, which had long been quiet, to the Channel to guard against a possible invasion by Marcus or Gratian that permitted the invaders to successfully enter the empire.) Hearing of the Germanic invasion the Roman military in Britain was desperate for some sense of security in a world that seemed to be rapidly falling apart. They next chose as their leader a man named after the famed emperor of the early fourth century, Constantine the Great, who had himself risen to power through a military coup in Britain. This Constantine was a common soldier, not an officer, and early in 407, possibly February, his fellows acclaimed him as emperor. The modern historian Francisco Sanz-Huesma differs and proposes that Constantine was a skilled politician who engineered the three acclamations with the (successful) intention of eventually raising himself to imperial power. Early coins of Constantine call him "Flavius Claudius Constantinus", a name he probably adopted because he thought it was that of Constantine the Great, when in fact it was that of his son, Constantine II. The style and legends of these early coins were also copied from those of Constantine II.

Rebellion in Roman Britain was not unusual, a contemporary described it as a "province rich in usurpers". It was on the periphery of the Empire and there was a common view that it was overlooked in terms of resources and patronage. Such revolts were usually short-lived; Constantine was uncommon in both establishing a lasting power base and in successfully exporting his rebellion to the mainland. Constantine moved quickly: he appointed two officers already in Gaul (modern France) as generals, Justinianus and Nebiogastes, instructing them to seize Arles and the passes which controlled traffic to and from Italy. He crossed the Channel at Bononia (modern Boulogne), taking with him all of the 6,000 or so mobile troops left in Britain and their commander, the general Gerontius. This denuded Roman Britain of front-line military protection and explains the disappearance of the legions in the early fifth century. Constantine travelled to Lyon, where he set up his headquarters and commenced minting coins in his own name. The Roman army in Gaul declared for him, followed by the civilian administration in Hispania (modern Spain and Portugal). The central Roman authorities did not respond to the Germanic invasion, and Constantine's forces got the better of at least one confrontation with the Vandals. Constantine also negotiated agreements with the Germanic groupings of the Franks, Alamanni and the Burgundians, thus securing the line of the Rhine. The main Vandal force and their allies moved into northern Gaul (modern Belgium).

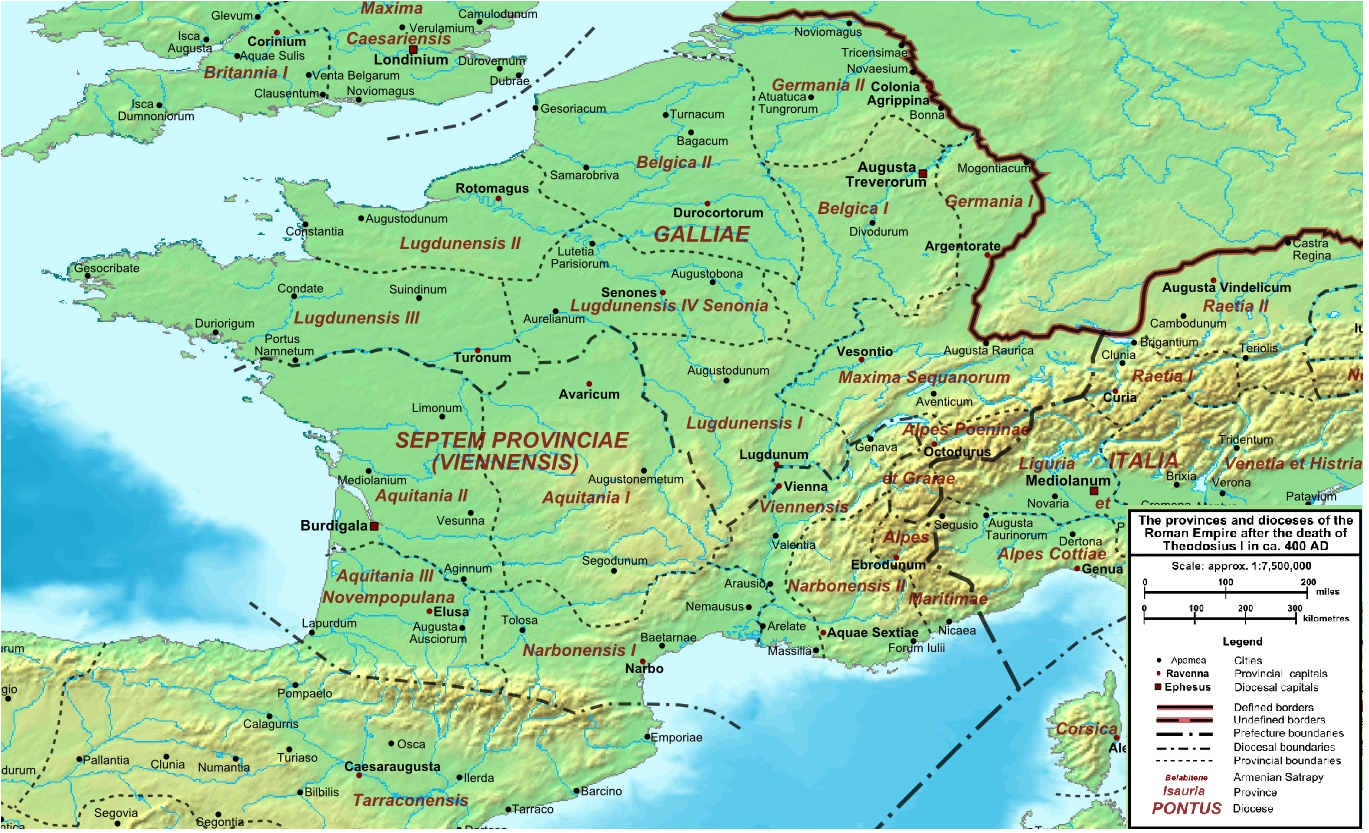
Roman Gaul at the time of Constantine

The Western Roman emperor, Honorius, and his commander-in-chief Stilicho were in conflict with the Eastern Roman Empire and allied to a large force of Visigoths under Alaric. The relationship with the Visigoths was shaky – they were demanding land or money for their services. An agreement was reached for a joint West Roman-Visigoth army to threaten the Eastern Empire to extort land from it which would then be given to the Visigoths. This manoeuvre was supposed to commence in May or June 407. By then the Vandals and their allies had broken into Gaul, where Constantine had control of the army and was claiming the imperial throne. Sending a large Western Roman force to the east would have left Italy open to invasion by one or both of these groups and so the offensive was cancelled. Instead a small army led by Sarus the Goth was sent west to put down Constantine's revolt while Stilicho's main army waited on events.

Sarus defeated the army commanded by Justinianus in a pitched battle, killing Justinianus. Constantine personally moved against Sarus, but was besieged in Valence. Nebiogastes attempted to negotiate and was killed by Sarus. Another army, led by Gerontius and Edobichus and largely made up of freshly recruited Franks and Almannics, arrived to relieve Valence after a week of siege. Sarus was forced to retreat into Italy. Central control had deteriorated to the extent that Sarus needed to buy his passage through the Alpine passes from the brigand Bagaudae, who controlled them. With this success Constantine established control over most of Gaul and the Alpine passes into Italy.

=== Co-emperor ===
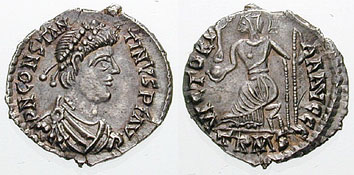
Siliqua of Constantine III. The reverse celebrates the victories of him and his co-emperors.

By May 408 Constantine had captured Arles and made it his capital, taking over the existing imperial administration and officials, and appointing Apollinaris as chief minister (with the title of praetorian prefect). Heros was installed as a pliant archbishop of Arles in spite of local opposition. (Note: After Constantine's death, Heros was deposed and exiled, and was replaced by Patroclus.) Constantine commenced minting large quantities of good quality coins at Arles, possibly using bullion seized from Sarus's loot during his hasty retreat, and made a show of being an equal of both the Western and Eastern Emperors.

Constantine's oldest son had entered a monastery and was a monk at the time his father rebelled, but he was summoned to the new imperial court. Constantine appointed him to the position of caesar – a senior, formal position that also recognised him as heir apparent – and gave him the imperial-sounding name of Constans. He was swiftly married so a dynasty could be founded. Early in 408, he was sent with Gerontius into Hispania. Hispania was a stronghold of the House of Theodosius, but, on Constantine's initial landing on the continent, Honorius's relatives and partisans there had been either unwilling or militarily unable to oppose his assumption of control. When Sarus seemed on the verge of ending Constantine's revolt, two members of Honorius's family – Didymus and Verinianus – rebelled and overthrew Constantine's regime in Hispania. When Sarus withdrew to Italy, the knowledge of the large new army assembling at Ticinum (modern Pavia) with the intention of shortly engaging Constantine encouraged them to persist and even to attempt to seal the Pyrenean passes. Constantine feared that Honorius's cousins would organise an attack from that direction while troops under Sarus and Stilicho attacked him from Italy in a pincer manoeuvre. He struck first, at Hispania. Constans and Gerontius's army forced a pass and was reinforced. Constans established himself at Saragossa and rebuilt the civilian administration. Gerontius took the army and decisively defeated Honorius's supporters at a battle in Lusitania where Didymus and Verinianus were captured. With Hispania back under Constantine's control Constans left his new wife at Saragossa and returned to Arles to report to his father. Didymus and Verinianus accompanied him and were executed as civilian rebels, which further soured relations with Honorius.

By early 408 the Visigoths were running out of patience with Stilicho. They moved from Epirus (modern Albania) to Noricum (modern Austria) and demanded a payment of 4,000 pounds (1,800 kg) of gold on pain of their invading Italy. Honorius and the Roman Senate were prepared to resist, but Stilicho persuaded them to approve the payment to allow him to concentrate on the situation in Gaul. He had assembled an army at Ticinum with which to do this. It is possible that the plan was for the Visigoths to accompany this force as military allies. On 1 May, the emperor of the Eastern Empire, Arcadius, died, leaving a seven-year-old heir, Theodosius II. A disagreement arose between Stilicho and Honorius, who each wished to travel to Constantinople – the capital of the Eastern Empire – to represent the Western Empire's interests. Stilicho got his way: He was to leave for the east while Honorius remained in Ravenna, the capital of the Western Empire. But a rift between him and Honorius was obvious. The Roman establishment, led by the senior bureaucrat Olympius, worked to oppose Stilicho by spreading rumours that he wished to travel east to depose Theodosius and set his own son on the throne. On 13 August Honorius was formally reviewing the army about to set out from Ticinum against Constantine. With him were many of the senior officers and officials of the Western Empire. The troops mutinied, slaughtering Stilicho's supporters but respecting the person of the Emperor. Stilicho sought sanctuary, then surrendered and was executed on 22 August.

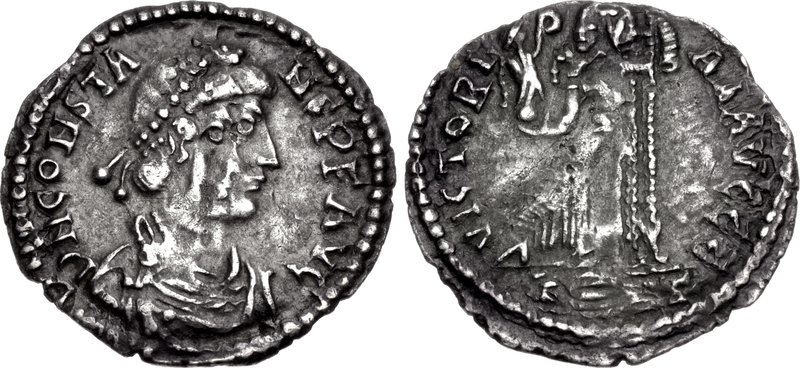
Siliqua of Constans II

Olympius reversed the policy of making a massive payment to the Visigoths and the native parts of the Army of Italy started slaughtering Goths, especially their fellow soldiers and their wives and children. The latter, living in Italian cities, sometimes overtly as hostages for their husbands' and fathers' good behaviour, were easy targets. Those Goths who could fled north and joined Alaric, greatly increasing his fighting strength. Alaric promptly crossed the Alps and headed south through Italy, devastating the countryside. He camped his army outside Rome and demanded a huge ransom. Late in 408 Constantine sent an embassy to Ravenna. Needing to placate him, Honorius acknowledged him as co-emperor and sent a purple robe as formal recognition. The pair were joint consuls in 409. At around this time, Constantine raised Constans to the position of co-emperor, theoretically equal in rank to Honorius or Theodosius, as well as to Constantine.

With the Visigoths deep in Italy and unopposed, Olympius's influence ended (Note: Constantius had Olympius clubbed to death in late 410 or early 411.) and a new chief minister, Jovius, entered into peace negotiations but Honorius continued to refuse to reach an agreement with Alaric. The Visigoths in retaliation continued to roam across Italy and extort vast sums from the city of Rome. Alaric elevated his own emperor, the senator Priscus Attalus, to no avail. On 24 August 410 the Visigoths entered Rome and pillaged the city for three days.

=== Decline ===
In spring or summer 409 Apollinaris was replaced as praetorian prefect by Decimus Rusticus and Constans was sent back to Hispania. Either before Constans left Arles or while he was travelling Gerontius rebelled, proclaiming his client Maximus as emperor. Maximus was an important figure in his own right, but it was clear he was controlled by Gerontius. They set up court at Tarraco (modern Tarragona). Gerontius was concerned that he would not be able to withstand the military force Constantine could bring to bear and so attempted to incite the barbarians who had entered Gaul late in 406 against Constantine. These had been quiescent in the north of the territory, but now set off across Gaul for the rich territories of Aquitaine and Narbonensis (modern south-west and southern France). They spread devastation across these areas, much to the horror of the populace. Concentrating on the threat from Constans, Gerontius weakened his garrisons in the Pyrenean passes and in autumn 409 much of the barbarian force entered Hispania. Eventually Gerontius was able to reach a modus operandi with some of these groups whereby they supplied him with military forces, which enabled him to take the offensive against Constantine.

From 408 Saxon pirates raided Roman Britain extensively, undeterred by the totally inadequate force which Constantine had left. The locals organised their own defences, so successfully that they defeated the Saxons in 409. Distressed that Constantine had failed to defend them, the Roman inhabitants of Britain rebelled and expelled his officials, accepting that henceforth they would have to look to their own defence. Inspired by the example of Roman Britain, later that year the Bagaudae of Armorica (modern Brittany) also expelled Constantine's officials and declared independence.

Constantine sent a further embassy to Ravenna, which achieved little, but Constantine's emissary, Jovius, did suborn one of Honorius's senior generals, Allobich. In spring 410 Constantine led an army into northern Italy. It is possible that he claimed he intended to assist Honorius against the Visigoths. It is also likely he was counting on support from Allobich. When he reached the River Po he heard, wrongly, that Allobich was dead, which caused him to abandon his mission and withdraw to Arles.

Meanwhile, Constans, with an army commanded by a general named Justus, attempted to subdue Gerontius. He failed, although no details are known, and returned to Arles in spring 410. At about the same time Constantine returned from his abortive invasion of Italy. Given the difficulties the Visigoths were creating in Italy, Gerontius was considered a greater threat than Honorius. Edobichus was again sent north to raise troops from the Franks while Constans returned to confront Gerontius with a fresh army. Events are again unclear, but it seems likely that Gerontius was simultaneously advancing on Arles. The two armies clashed and Constans was defeated. He fell back to the north with what was left of his command, hoping to be reinforced by Edobichus. But Gerontius caught him at Vienne, probably early in 411, defeated his army and killed Constans. Gerontius's army then marched on Arles and besieged Constantine.

=== Fall ===
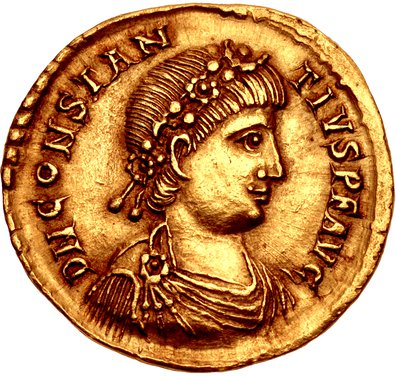
Solidus of Constantius III

In 411 Honorius appointed a new general, Constantius III, who took the Army of Italy over the Alps into Gaul in another attempt to suppress Constantine. Constantius arrived at Arles while Gerontius was outside the city. Many of Gerontius's troops deserted to Constantius and Gerontius retreated to Hispania with the remainder. There, in a hopeless position, Gerontius committed suicide. Constantius's army took over the siege. Meanwhile, Edobichus raised troops in northern Gaul among the Franks and Alamanni, combined them with those of the Army of Gaul still loyal to Constantine and marched to Constantine's assistance. Constantius defeated this force in an ambush. Constantine, his hopes fading after the troops guarding the Rhine abandoned him to support yet another claimant to the imperial throne, the Gallo-Roman Jovinus, surrendered to Constantius along with his surviving son Julian. Despite a promise of safe passage, and Constantine's assumption of clerical office, Constantius imprisoned the former soldier and had him and Julian beheaded in either August or September 411. His head was mounted on a pole and presented to Emperor Honorius on 18 September. It was later displayed outside Carthage, as was that of Julian. (Note: In 414 the heads of Jovinus and his son were also to be seen at Carthage.)

== Aftermath ==
Constantius withdrew in the face of Jovinus's forces. The modern historian Peter Heather describes the Roman Army of Gaul as emerging from Constantine's wars "in tatters". In 413 a Visigoth army under Athaulf, who was now allied with Honorius, suppressed Jovinus's revolt. Constantius took over Stilicho's role as the main power in the Western Empire and generalissimo. He was broadly able to recover the situation for the central authorities and to enable reconstruction. Gaul was pacified, the rebellion in Armorica was quashed and the area brought back under Roman control, the barbarians in Hispania were in large part subdued and the Visigoths were settled on land in Aquitaine as Roman allies. Roman rule never returned to Britain after Constantine stripped its defences. In 417 Constantius married Honorius's sister, Galla Placidia. On 8 February 421 Honorius made Constantius co-emperor under himself. Constantius reigned only seven months, dying on 2 September. Honorius then ruled alone until his death in 423, whereupon Constantius's son, Valentinian III, assumed the throne.

== Legend ==
Constantine III is also known as Constantine II of Britain. He has been associated with the Constantine found in Geoffrey of Monmouth's popular (though fictitious) Historia Regum Britanniae, who comes to power following Gracianus Municeps's reign. Geoffrey's Constantine, through his son Uther Pendragon, becomes the grandfather of the legendary King Arthur. Other sources explicitly state that Constantine III is the grandfather of Arthur.

== Notes, citations and sources ==
=== Sources ===
- Ashe, Geoffrey (1996). "Constantine (1)". In Lacy, Norris J. (ed.). The New Arthurian Encyclopedia. New York: Garland. p. 98. ISBN 978-1-5686-5432-4.
- de la Bédoyère, Guy (2001). Eagles Over Britannia: The Roman Army in Britain. Stroud: Tempus. ISBN 978-0-7524-1923-7.
- Birley, Anthony (2005). The Roman Government in Britain. Oxford: Oxford University Press. ISBN 978-0-1992-5237-4.
- Burns, T. S. (1994). Barbarians Within the Gates of Rome: A Study of Roman Military Policy and the Barbarians, ca. 375–425. Bloomington: Indiana University Press. ISBN 978-0-2533-1288-4.
- Bury, J. B. (1889). A History of the Later Roman Empire from Arcadius to Irene. Vol. 1. London; New York: Macmillan. OCLC 22138662.
- Curley, Michael J. (1994). Geoffrey of Monmouth. New York: Twayne. ISBN 978-0-8057-7055-1.
- Drinkwater, J. F. (1998). "The Usurpers Constantine III (407–411) and Jovinus (411–413)". Britannia. 29: 269–298. doi:10.2307/526818. JSTOR 526818. S2CID 161846385.
- Elton, Hugh (1999). "Constantine III (407–411 A.D.)". De Imperatoribus Romanis. Florida International University.
- Foss, Clive (2005). "Emperors Named Constantine". Revue numismatique. 6 (161): 93–102. doi:10.3406/numi.2005.2594.
- Frere, Sheppard Sunderland (1987). Britannia: A History of Roman Britain (3rd, revised ed.). London: Routledge & Kegan Paul. ISBN 978-0-7102-1215-3.
- Heather, Peter (2005). The Fall of the Roman Empire. Basingstoke and Oxford: Pan Macmillan. ISBN 978-0-3339-8914-2.
- Heather, Peter (2008) [1998]. "Goths and Huns, c. 320–425". In Cameron, Averil; Garnsey, Peter (eds.). The Cambridge Ancient History: The Late Empire, A.D. 337–425. Vol. XIII. Cambridge: Cambridge University Press. pp. 487–515. ISBN 978-0-5213-0200-5.
- Heinzelmann, M. (1992). "The 'Affair' of Hilary of Arles (445) and Gallo-Roman Identity in the Fifth Century". In Drinkwater, John; Elton, Hugh (eds.). Fifth-Century Gaul: A Crisis of Identity?. Cambridge: Cambridge University Press. pp. 239–251. ISBN 978-0-5214-1485-2.
- Higham, Nicholas (1992). Rome, Britain and the Anglo-Saxons. London: B. A. Seaby. ISBN 978-1-8526-4022-4.
- Hollway, Don (2022). At the Gates of Rome The Fall of the Eternal City, AD 410. Oxford: Bloomsbury Publishing. ISBN 978-1-4728-4996-0.
- Hunt, David (2008) [1998]. "The Church as a Public Institution". In Cameron, Averil; Garnsey, Peter (eds.). The Cambridge Ancient History: The Late Empire, A.D. 337–425. Vol. XIII. Cambridge: Cambridge University Press. pp. 238–276. ISBN 978-0-5213-0200-5.
- Jones, Arnold Hugh Martin; Martindale, John Robert & Morris, John (1992). The Prosopography of the Later Roman Empire. Vol. 2. Cambridge: Cambridge University Press. ISBN 978-0-5212-0159-9.
- Jones, Barri; Mattingly, David (1990). An Atlas of Roman Britain (2007 ed.). Cambridge: Blackwell Publishers. ISBN 978-1-8421-7067-0.
- Kent, John (2018) [1994]. Roman Imperial Coinage. Volume X. Spink Books. ISBN 978-1-912667-37-6.
- Kulikowski, Michael (2000). "Barbarians in Gaul, Usurpers in Britain". Britannia. 31: 325–334. doi:10.2307/526925. JSTOR 526925. S2CID 162663612.
- Mattingly, David (2006). An Imperial Possession: Britain in the Roman Empire (2007 ed.). London: Penguin Books. ISBN 978-0-1401-4822-0.
- Miller, M. (1975). "Stilicho's Pictish War". Britannia. 6: 141–144. doi:10.2307/525995. JSTOR 525995. S2CID 154735147.
- Mitchell, Stephen (2007). A History of the Later Roman Empire. Malden: Blackwell. ISBN 978-1-4051-0856-0.
- Sanz-Huesma, Francisco (2005). "Usurpaciones en Britania (406–407): hipótesis sobre sus causas y protagonistas [Usurpations in Britain (406–407): Hypotheses Regarding Their Causes and Protagonists]". Gerión (in Spanish) (23): 315–324.
- Snyder, Christopher A. (1998). An Age of Tyrants: Britain and the Britons A.D. 400–600. University Park: Pennsylvania State University Press. ISBN 978-0-2710-1780-8.
- Snyder, Christopher A. (2003). The Britons. Malden: Blackwell Publishing. ISBN 978-0-6312-2260-6.
- Thompson, E. A. (1977). "Britain, A.D. 406–410". Britannia. 8: 303–318. doi:10.2307/525904. ISSN 0068-113X. JSTOR 525904. S2CID 161802945.
- Ward-Perkins, Bryan (2006). The Fall of Rome and the End of Civilisation. Oxford: Oxford University Press. ISBN 978-0-1928-0728-1.
- Wijnendaele, Jeroen W. P. (2018). ""Dagli altari alla polvere." Alaric, Constantine III, and the Downfall of Stilicho". Journal of Ancient History. 6 (2): 260–277. doi:10.1515/jah-2018-0012. OCLC 7938682414. S2CID 165726112.

Regnal titles
Preceded by Honorius	Western Roman emperor 407–411 with Honorius	Succeeded by Honorius
Political offices
Preceded by Anicius Auchenius Bassus; Flavius Philippus	Roman consul 409 with Honorius and Theodosius II	Succeeded by Varanes; Tertullus
Legendary titles
Vacant Turmoil Title last held by Gracianus Municeps	King of Britain; 407–411	Succeeded by Constans
