= Nebiogastes =

Nebiogastes (Greek: Νεοβιγάστης or Νεβιγάστιος; died 407 AD) was a Roman military commander that supported the usurper Constantine III.

== Life ==
Nebiogastes was an officer of the Western Roman army in Britain. In 407 the general Claudius Constantine (Constantine III) rebelled against Emperor Honorius and appointed Nebiogastes and Iustinianus magistri militum of the army of Gaul. Constantine crossed the English Channel and attacked the troops loyal to Honorius in Gaul. Nebiogastes was persuaded to meet with Sarus, one of Honorius' generals, but was betrayed and killed.

== See also ==
- Sarus campaign against Constantine III

== Sources ==
- Olympiodorus of Thebes, fragment 12
- Zosimus, VI.2.2-3.
- Martindale, John R., ed. (1980). The Prosopography of the Later Roman Empire: Volume II, AD 395–527. Cambridge: Cambridge University Press. ISBN 0-521-20159-4.
