= 70s BC =

Decade

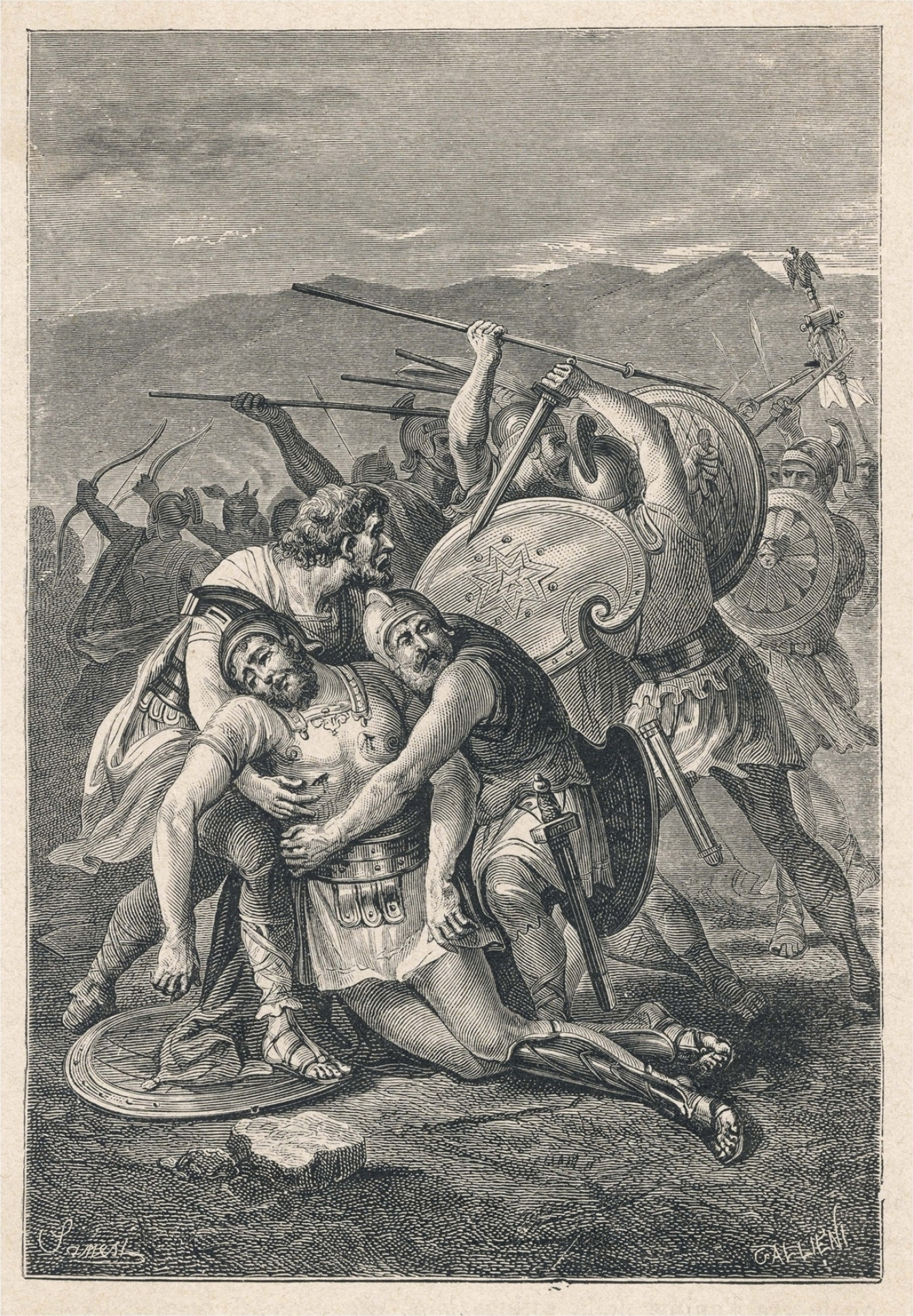
71 BC marks the end of the Third Servile War at the Battle of the Silarius River.

The 70s BC were the period 79 BC – 70 BC.

== Events ==
=== 79 BC ===
==== By place ====
====== Roman republic ======
- Sulla renounces his dictatorship.
- Cicero travels to Athens and then to Rhodes to continue his studies of philosophy and oratory.

=== 78 BC ===
==== By place ====
====== Roman Republic ======
- In Rome, Marcus Aemilius Lepidus becomes consul. He attempts to undermine the Sullan reforms, quarrels with his consular colleague, is sent to govern Transalpine Gaul, and initiates a rebellion against the Senate with his army there.
- The Senate sends Publius Servilius Vatia to Cilicia as governor, where he fights a successful campaign against the Piracy in southern Anatolia (Lycia, Pamphylia and Isauria), he is thereafter known by the agnomen Isauricus.
- The Tabularium is built in the Forum.
- The Third Dalmatian war begins.
- Julius Caesar returns to Rome after about two years of service in the army

=== 77 BC ===
==== By place ====
====== Roman Republic ======
- Marcus Aemilius Lepidus, Roman proconsul of Transalpine Gaul and leader of the Populares faction in the senate, is defeated by Quintus Lutatius Catulus at the Milvian bridge outside Rome. The remnants of the rebels are wiped out by Pompey in Etruria.
- Lepidus, with some 21,000 troops, manages to escape to Sardinia. Soon afterwards he becomes ill and dies, his battered army, now under command by Marcus Perperna Vento, sails on to the Iberian Peninsula.
- Pompeius marches along the Via Domitia through Gallia Narbonensis crossing the Pyrenees to Spain. He joins with Quintus Metellus Pius to suppress the revolt of Quintus Sertorius, but is at first unsuccessful.

====== Armenia ======
- The city of Tigranakert of Artsakh is built.

=== 76 BC ===
==== By place ====
====== Judea ======
- Salome Alexandra becomes queen of Judea, after the death of her husband, Alexander Jannaeus, until 67 BC.
- Hyrcanus II becomes high priest of Jerusalem for the first time, on the death of his father, Alexander Jannaeus, until 66 BC.

====== Roman Republic ======
- The Third Dalmatian war ends with the capture of Salona by proconsul Gaius Cosconius and the victory of Rome.
- On the Iberian Peninsula, in the Roman province of Hispania Citerior, the rebel forces of Quintus Sertorius defeat the republican army of Pompey the Great at the Battle of Lauron.

=== 75 BC ===
==== By place ====
====== Roman Republic ======
- In Rome, the tribune Quintus Opimius speaks out against Sullan restrictions on the tribunate, in orations noted for sarcasm against conservatives.
- Cicero is quaestor in Western Sicily.
- Nicomedes IV of Bithynia bequeaths his kingdom to Rome on his death (75/4 BC). Angered by the arrangement, Mithridates VI of Pontus declares war on Rome and invades Bithynia, Cappadocia and Paphlagonia, thus starting the Third Mithridatic War.
- Third Mithridatic War: M. Aurelius Cotta is defeated by Mithridates in the Battle of Chalcedon.
- Julius Caesar travels to Rhodes and is taken captive by pirates\
- In the Roman province of Hispania Citerior a republican army under Pompey the Great defeats an army of Sertorian rebels at the Battle of Valentia.
- In the Roman province of Hispania Ulterior a republican army under Quintus Caecilius Metellus Pius defeats an army of Sertorian rebels at the Battle of Italica.
- In the Roman province of Hispania Citerior an army of Sertorian rebels under Quintus Sertorius himself defeats a republican army under Pompey the Great at the Battle of Sucro.
- At the Battle of Saguntum the republican forces on the Iberian Peninsula and the Sertorian rebels fight each other to a draw. Quintus Sertorius is forced to withdraw leaving the battlefield to Pompey and Metellus (the republican commanders).

====== Greece ======
- Julius Caesar travels to Rhodes to study under Apollonius Molon. On his way across the Aegean Sea, he is kidnapped by Cilician pirates and held prisoner in the Dodecanese islet of Pharmacusa. The young Caesar is held for a ransom of twenty talents, but he insists they ask for fifty. After his release Caesar raises a fleet at Miletus, pursues and crucifies the pirates in Pergamon.

==== By topic ====
====== Literature ======
- Start of Golden Age of Latin Literature.

=== 74 BC ===
==== By place ====
====== Roman Republic ======
- Nicomedes IV, last king of Bithynia bequeaths his kingdom to the Roman Senate upon his death (75/4 BC).
- Third Mithridatic War: Battle of Cyzicus: Roman forces under Lucius Lucullus defeat the forces of Mithridates VI of Pontus.
- Marcus Antonius (father of Mark Antony), a praetor, receives wide-ranging powers and considerable resources to fight the pirates in the Mediterranean Sea.
- Publius Servilius Vatia returns to Rome, where he has triumphed against the pirates in Anatolia, and is given the agnomen Isauricus.
- Cyrene becomes a Roman province.

====== Spain ======
- Pamplona is founded.

=== 73 BC ===
==== By place ====
====== Roman Republic ======
- Third Servile War: Spartacus, a Thracian gladiator, escapes with around 70 slave-gladiators from a gladiator school at Capua. They defeat a small Roman force and equip themselves with captured military equipment as well with gladiatorial weapons. Spartacus and his band of gladiators plunder the region surrounding Capua and retire to a defensible position on Mount Vesuvius.
- Battle of Mount Vesuvius: Spartacus defeats a Roman militia force (3,000 men) under Gaius Claudius Glaber. The rebel slaves spend the winter of 73–72 BC training, arming and equipping their new recruits, as well as expanding their raiding territory, which includes the towns of Nola, Nuceria, Thurii and Metapontum.
- On the Iberian Peninsula (part of the Roman Republic) rebel leader Quintus Sertorius is assassinated by some of his own lieutenants (lead by Marcus Perperna). (Note: the year of his assassination is disputed – the debate is whether he was assassinated in 73 or 72 BCE) Perperna takes command of the rebel army.

=== 72 BC ===
==== By place ====
====== Roman Republic ======
- Third Servile War: Spartacus moves with his followers northward to the Po Valley. Roman forces under Lucius Gellius Publicola defeat a group of slaves (30,000 men) led by Crixus near Mount Gargano. He kills two-thirds of the rebels, including Crixus himself.
- Summer – Spartacus and his followers defeat the Roman forces under Gnaeus Cornelius Lentulus Clodianus and Gellius, forcing the Roman legions to retreat in disarray. Both consuls are recalled to Rome in disgrace and relieved of their duties.
- Spartacus moves north again, to cross the Alps into Gaul and then to Thracia. Outside Mutina on the plain of the River Po he defeats the Roman forces under Gaius Cassius Longinus, governor of Gallia Cisalpina.
- Autumn – Spartacus and his followers withdraw to the Bruttium peninsula. At one juncture he contemplates attacking Rome – but moves south. The Senate sends Marcus Licinius Crassus against Spartacus.
- Winter – Spartacus decides to camp near Thurii. Marcus Licinius Crassus with ten Roman legions tries to trap the rebels in the toe of Italy. He builds a trench and a low earth rampart (with a fortified palisade).
- Battle of Cabira: Lucius Lucullus defeats King Mithridates VI and overruns Pontus. Mithridates flees to Armenia, ruled by his son-in-law Tigranes, who refuses to turn his father-in-law in to Lucius Lucullus.
- On the Iberian Peninsula (part of the Roman Republic) rebel leader Quintus Sertorius is assassinated by some of his own lieutenants (led by Marcus Perperna). (Note: the year of his assassination is disputed – the debate is whether he was assassinated in 73 or 72 BCE) Perperna takes command of the rebel army.
- Perperna is defeated by Pompey the Great at the Battle of Osca, ending the Sertorian War in Spain.

====== Europe ======
- The Suebi and other tribes under King Ariovistus invade Gaul.

=== 71 BC ===
==== By place ====
====== Roman Republic ======
- Third Servile War ends; Slave rebellion under leadership of Spartacus is crushed by a Roman army under Marcus Licinius Crassus. Slaves taken prisoner are crucified naked along the Via Appia.
- Marcus Antonius is defeated by the Cretans, who have made an alliance with the pirates. He is compelled to concede a humiliating peace. Antonius dies in office the same year and is awarded, posthumously, with the cognomen Creticus.
- Nessebar in modern-day Bulgaria comes under Roman rule.

=== 70 BC ===
==== By place ====
====== Roman Republic ======
- August – In Rome, Cicero prosecutes former governor Verres; Verres exiles himself to Marseille before the trial is over.
- The office of censor is reinstated.
- Lucullus captures Sinop, then invades Armenia.

====== Parthia ======
- Phraates III becomes the king of Parthia.

== Births ==
78 BC

- Jing Fang, Chinese mathematician and music theorist (d. 37 BC)

77 BC

- Berenice IV Epiphaneia, Greek princess and queen of the Ptolemaic Kingdom (d. 55 BC)
- Liu Xiang, Chinese scholar, editor of the Shan Hai Jing, compilator of the Lienü zhuan, and father of Liu Xin (d. 6 BC)

75 BC

- Calpurnia, Roman noblewoman and wife of Julius Caesar
- Gaius Asinius Pollio, Roman politician and poet (d. AD 4)
- Yuan of Han, Chinese emperor of the Han Dynasty (d. 33 BC)

73 BC

- Herod the Great, client king of Judea (d. 4 BC)
- Marcus Porcius Cato, assassin of Julius Caesar (d. 42 BC)

71 BC

- Wang Zhengjun, Chinese empress of the Han dynasty (d. AD 13)

70 BC

- October 15 – Virgil, Roman poet (d. 19 BC)
- Cleopatra VII, queen of Egypt (d. 30 BC)
- Crinagoras, Greek epigrammatist (d. 18 BC)
- Gaius Maecenas, Roman politician (d. 8 BC)

== Deaths ==
79 BC

- Sulla dies in Campania

78 BC

- Lucius Cornelius Sulla, Roman general and statesman (b. 138 BC)

77 BC

- Marcus Aemilius Lepidus, Roman statesman and consul (b. 120 BC)
- Tian Qianqiu, Chinese politician and prime minister
- Titus Quinctius Atta, Roman comedy writer
- Vattagamani Abhaya, king of Sri Lanka

76 BC

- Alexander Jannaeus, king and high priest of Judea

75 BC

- Gaius Herennius, tribune of the plebs in 80 BC and legate to Quintus Sertorius during the Sertorian War, killed at the Battle of Valentia.
- Lucius Hirtuleius, right-hand-man of Quintus Sertorius during the Sertorian War, killed at the Battle of Saguntum.
- Gaius Memmius, brother-in-law of Pompey the Great, died at the Battle of Saguntum.

74 BC

- Lucius Aelius Stilo Praeconinus, Roman philologist
- Lucius Octavius, Roman politician and consul
- Nicomedes IV (Philopator), king of Bithynia
- Zhao of Han, Chinese emperor (b. 94 BC)

73 BC

- Devabhuti, king of the Shunga Empire
- Gaius Aurelius Cotta, Roman statesman and orator
- Quintus Sertorius, leader of the Sertorian rebels during the Sertorian War
- Heli, king of Britain (approximate date)

72 BC

- Crixus, Gaulish gladiator and military leader
- Quintus Sertorius, leader of the Sertorian rebels during the Sertorian War
- Marcus Perperna Vento, lieutenant of Quintus Sertorius during the Sertorian War

71 BC

- Castus, Gallic gladiator and rebel leader
- Gannicus, Celtic gladiator and rebel leader
- Marcus Antonius Creticus, Roman politician (father of Mark Antony)
- Spartacus, Thracian gladiator and rebel leader (presumably killed in battle) (b. 109 BC)
- Xu Pingjun, Chinese empress of the Han dynasty

70 BC

- Mithridates I, king of Commagene
- Sanatruces (or Sanatruk), king of Parthia
