= Battle of Saguntum (75 BC) =

Battle of the Sertorian War

- Part of the Sertorian War
Date	75 BC
Location	On the plain of "Saguntum"
Result	Draw

Belligerents
Sertorian Rebels	Roman Republic

Commanders and leaders
Quintus Sertorius; Marcus Perpenna Vento; Lucius Hirtuleius †	Quintus Caecilius Metellus Pius; Gnaeus Pompeius Magnus (Pompey)

Strength
Unknown but similar to the Romans	10 understrength legions and an unknown number of auxiliaries and allied troops

Casualties and losses
Sertorius: 3,000; Perpenna: 5,000; Lucius Hirtuleius †	Pompey: 6,000, Metellus: unknown; C. Memmius †

The Battle of Saguntum was fought in 75 BC between forces of the Roman Republic under the command of Gnaeus Pompeius Magnus and Quintus Caecilius Metellus Pius and an army of Sertorian rebels under the command of Quintus Sertorius. The location of the battle is disputed, but it was most likely near modern Langa de Duero, as Sallust informs us the battle was fought on the banks of the river Douro. The battle lasted from noon till night and ended in a draw.

== Background ==
In 88 BC, Lucius Cornelius Sulla marched his legions on Rome, starting a period of civil wars. Quintus Sertorius, a client of Gaius Marius, joined his patron's faction and took up the sword against the Sullan faction (mainly optimates). After the death of Lucius Cornelius Cinna and Gaius Marius, Sertorius lost faith in his faction's leadership. In 82 BC, during the war against Sulla, he left Italy for his assigned province in Hispania. Unfortunately his faction lost the war in Italy right after his departure, and in 81 BC Sulla sent Gaius Annius Luscus with several legions to take the Iberian provinces from Sertorius. After a brief resistance Sertorius and his men are expelled from Hispania. They ended up in Mauretania in north-western Africa where they conquered the city of Tingis. Here the Lusitanians, a fierce Iberian tribe who were about to be invaded by a Sullan governor, approached him. They asked him to become their war leader in the fight against the Sullans. In 80 BC Sertorius landed at the little fishing town of Baelo near the Pillars of Hercules (Gibraltar) and returned to Hispania. Soon after his landing he fought and defeated the Sullan general Lucius Fufidius (the aforementioned Sullan governor) at the Baetis River. After this, he defeated several Sullan armies and drove his opponents from Hispania.

Threatened by Sertorius' successes, the Senate in Rome upgraded Hispania Ulterior to a proconsular province and sent the proconsul Quintus Caecilius Metellus Pius with a large army to fight him. Sertorius used guerrilla tactics so effectively that he wore down Metellus to the point of exhaustion while Sertorius' legate Lucius Hirtuleius defeated the governor of Hispania Citerior, Marcus Domitius Calvinus. In 76 BC the government in Rome decided to send Pompey and an even larger army to help Metellus. In the same year Sertorius was joined by Marcus Perpenna, who brought with him the remnants of the army of Marcus Aemilius Lepidus, the rebel consul of 78 BC. Thus reinforced, Sertorius decided to try and take the Iberian east coast (because the cities there supported his enemies). His first target was the city of Lauron where he outgeneraled Pompey and massacred a large part of his army (see: the battle of Lauron).

In 75 BC Sertorius decided to take on Metellus and leave the battered Pompey to his legates Perpenna and Gaius Herennius. Pompey defeated his opponents in a battle near Valentia forcing Sertorius to come and take charge of the situation. Metellus used the change in command to defeat Hirtuleius, left in charge of the Sertorian western army, at the Battle of Italica and marched after Sertorius. Pompey and Sertorius, not wanting to wait for Metellus, met at the Battle of Sucro, which ended in a draw. Sertorius had to give up his conquest of the Iberian east coast and withdrew inland. Metellus and Pompey followed him to "Saguntum" (probably not Saguntum on the coast, for he had withdrawn inland, but one of the many Segontias in Celtiberia).

== Prelude ==
After the disastrous battles of Valentia and Italica and the draw and retreat from the Battle of Sucro, Sertorius had to raise the morale of his troops. In this he succeeded by using the White Fawn. Sertorius owned a white fawn which he claimed gave him messages from the goddess Diana. With his forces morale raised he awaited the Roman armies while launching many guerilla raids to weaken them during their advance. The Romans were hard pressed for supplies and Metellus decided to march on the Celtiberian town of Segontia to feed his army on their stores. Sertorius's Celtiberian troops refused to let one of their towns fall into Roman hands and fighting ensued.

== Battle ==
Plutarch remarks that this battle was forced upon Sertorius (probably by his Iberian and/or Celt-Iberian troops). The fighting started at noon and lasted well into the night. Sertorius first fought Pompey while his legates Perpenna and Hirtuleius fought Metellus. After Hirtuleius had fallen Sertorius switched places with Perpenna and launched several attacks on Metellus intended on taking him out of the fight. Metellus stood his ground and in the course of the fight he was wounded by a spear. This turned out to be a turning point in the battle for Metellus' men counter-attacked in revenge and pushed back the Iberians.

All the Romans who saw or heard of this [Metellus being wounded] were filled with shame at the idea of deserting their commander. The same event filled them with fury against the enemy. So, they covered Metellus with their shields and carried him out of danger. Then they fell energetically on the Iberians and pushed them back. Victory changed sides.

Metellus then complacently decided to rest his troops and made camp. Sertorius in the meantime had regrouped his men and in the evening launched an unexpected attack on Metellus' camp, and attempted to exploit its vulnerable position by cutting it off with a trench. Unfortunately for the Sertorians, Pompey and his army now showed up and forced them to withdraw. Over the course of the battle Pompey had lost 6,000 men while Sertorius had lost only 3,000, but to offset this Perperna had lost some 5,000 soldiers. Metellus's losses are unknown, but must have been significant as well. Sertorius' second-in-command, Lucius Hirtuleius, and Pompey's brother-in-law, Gaius Memmius (married to Pompey's sister), were among the casualties.

== Aftermath ==
This was the last pitched battle Sertorius fought, and probably one he had not wanted in the first place. Sertorius ordered his army to break up and reassemble at a place he designated. He then made for the fortress town of Clunia and prepared for a siege. Even while fortifying Clunia Sertorius was dispatching messengers to his allies, requesting them to raise new levies. The war was far from over, Sertorius still had allies, his reputation and an army. After the Siege of Clunia he reverted to guerilla warfare and the war would drag on for another three years and only end because a few of his own men plotted against Sertorius and assassinated him.
