= Sulla's proscription =

Political murders by Sulla in 82–81 BC

Sulla's proscription was a reprisal campaign by the Roman proconsul and later dictator, Lucius Cornelius Sulla, to eliminate his enemies in the aftermath of his victory in the civil war of 83–82 BC.

Following his victory at the battle of the Colline Gate, Sulla wanted to take his revenge against the former supporters of Marius and Cinna, who had declared him a public enemy in 87 BC. After having obtained a positive vote from a popular assembly, he published two lists with the names of his enemies among senators and equites, the two tiers of the Roman aristocracy. The lists contained 520 names, of which 75 are known. Those on the lists had their lives and property forfeit; rewards were given to those who assassinated the victims. Several henchmen, as well prominent politicians who supported Sulla, massively profited from the proscription, collecting bounties and receiving seized properties at concessionary prices.

The proscription was just one element of the repression organised by Sulla against his enemies. Sulla concurrently ordered many show trials, summary executions, confiscations of property, and even the massacre of the Samnites, but they were not part of the proscription, which only targeted the Roman elite.

The sons of proscribed men were also targeted; they lost their civic rights and were forced into exile. Several attempts were made to rehabilitate the proscribed and their descendants, especially by Julius Caesar, but were mostly unsuccessful. Their full rehabilitation only took place in 49 BC, after Caesar took control of Rome during his civil war.

== History ==
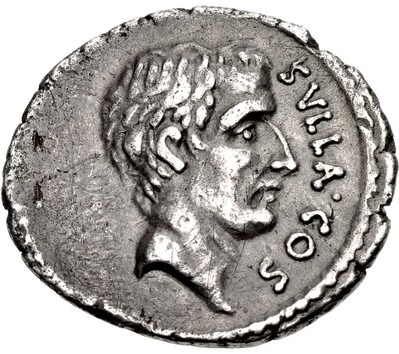
Portrait of Sulla on a denarius minted in 54 BC by his grandson Pompeius Rufus.

=== Background ===
In 88, (Note: All dates BC unless specified otherwise.) Sulla was consul and marched on Rome, deposing and killing one of the tribunes of the plebs and outlawing about ten of his political enemies, including Gaius Marius. The next year, after his consulship, Sulla left Italy for Greece in order to fight against the king of Pontus, Mithridates VI. His enemies Marius and Cinna seized power in his absence after fighting a short war against the Senate and then controlled politics of the Republic for several years. Meanwhile, Sulla won several victories in Greece against Mithridates and rapidly concluded a peace treaty under favourable terms for Pontus. In 83, he came back to Italy to fight the Cinno-Marian faction (Marius and Cinna had died in 86 and 84, respectively), whom he decisively defeated at battle of the Colline Gate on 1 November 82. While Sulla did not bear grudge against men who had served under Cinna but joined him when he returned, he would be merciless against his unrepentant enemies.

Sulla was appointed dictator rei publicae constituendae ("Dictator for the Reconstitution of the Republic").

=== Legislative process ===
Sulla drew up a list of those he considered enemies of the state. Initially, Sulla wanted to obtain a vote from the senate on his proscription, but during the session that took place on 2 November 82 in the Temple of Bellona, the senate rejected his proposal. This temple was located outside of the pomerium, the sacred boundary of Rome, so Sulla could retain his imperium (which he would have lost if he had entered the pomerium). This meeting of the senate took place next to the slaughter of the Samnite prisoners captured after the battle of the Colline Gate in the nearby villa publica, and whose shouts could probably be heard by senators. Sulla's bill was opposed by both moderate senators, such as the Julii Caesares, who were horrified by Sulla's ongoing massacre, and extremists like Marcus Licinius Crassus, who would have been limited by the scope of the proscription. Indeed, the victims would have been named in the law, preventing men like Crassus from launching indiscriminate purges.

The following day, Sulla countered his failure in the senate by calling a popular assembly, which approved the proscription. A first list of proscribed was immediately published under the form of an edict. It comprised 80 names, made of the most important of Sulla's enemies sorted by rank. The four remaining Marians of consular rank were listed first, including the consuls for 82. The first name on the list was Gnaeus Papirius Carbo, then Marius the Younger (consuls for 82), Gaius Norbanus, and Lucius Cornelius Scipio Asiagenus (consuls for 83). The following names were the praetors, starting with the most recent ones, then the tribunes of the plebs and active Marians. Almost every magistrate elected since Sulla's departure from Italy in 88 was targeted. A second list counting 440 names was published in two equal parts on 5 and 6 November. The lists were personally composed by Sulla and definitive. Nobody could be struck off the lists.

The proscribed were exclusively from the Roman aristocracy; equites were more numerous than senators, even though more names of the latter group have survived. Proscription lists were copied and sent to the rest of Italy to purge municipal administrations from the equites that opposed Sulla. Cicero, in his speech Pro Cluentio, tells that a certain Oppianicus was sent by Sulla to the city of Larinum, where he murdered four proscribed municipal councillors. The councillors were also Oppianicus' personal enemies, whose names he likely suggested to Sulla, who agreed to their proscription as they had been elected under the Marians. Apparently, Sulla was easily persuaded by his supporters to add new names on his lists. Romans of lower rank and foreigners were also prosecuted in many show trials throughout Italy and the provinces, often over futile charges, but they were not part of Sulla's proscription.

Nevertheless, the proscription limited the repression, because the names of Sulla's enemies were clearly listed, which avoided the risk of a general massacre. Ancient writers consider that this limitation was imposed on Sulla by some senators; Orosius gives the name of Catulus, Plutarch those of Gaius Caecilius Metellus and Fufidius.

In 81, Sulla passed a law named lex Cornelia de hostibus rei publicae which retroactively legalised the proscription and made the dispositions of the edict permanent (in Roman law, an edict was terminated at the end of the magistrate's mandate). The law listed again the names of the proscribed mentioned in the edict, but also covered all the people labelled enemies of the Republic, not just the proscribed, and organised the sale of their properties. The sale of properties was a way for Sulla to target his enemies who were already dead before his victory in 82. The lex Cornelia furthermore dealt with the descendants of the proscribed (liberi proscriptorum), who were deprived of their properties, civic rights, and banished from Rome. According to Plutarch, the greatest injustice of all the consequences was stripping the rights of their children and grandchildren.

=== Procedure ===
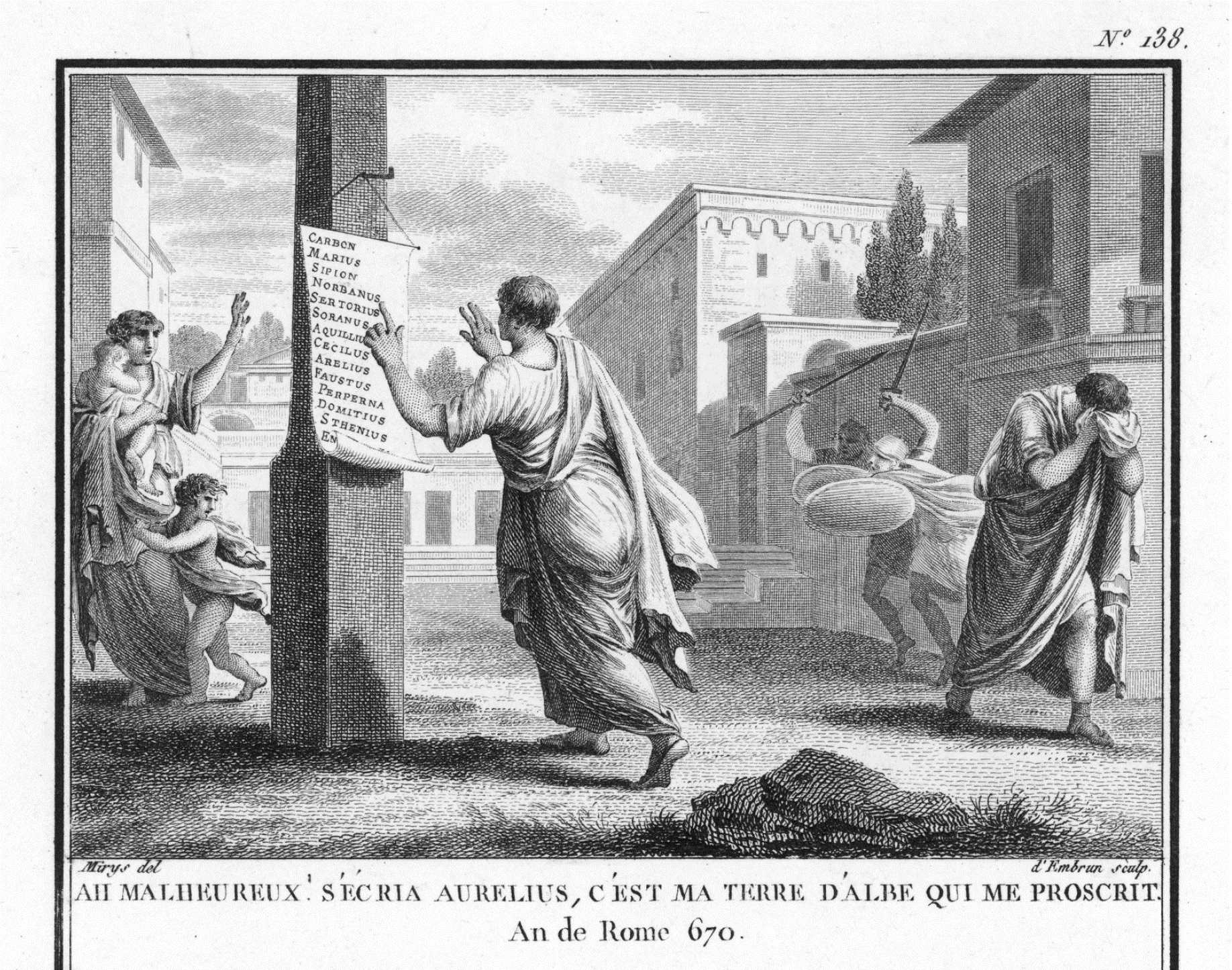
Etching of S.D. Mirys (c.1799), depicting Quintus Aurelius about to be murdered after he has found his name on the proscription list.

The proscribed names were painted over whitened planks (tabulae) displayed on the forum and possibly read by a herald. Full immunity was granted to anybody killing someone on the list. In addition, people who assisted proscribed ones were also put to death, but they were not in turn inscribed on the proscription list. A large reward of 48,000 sesterces (or 12,000 denarii) (Note: Sums in denarii have been converted to sesterces for consistency (at a rate of 1 denarius for 4 sesterces), as ancient and modern sources interchangeably use sesterces, denarii, or Attic talents.) was offered for the head of a proscribed man, while informants also received compensation. Slaves who murdered their proscribed master were likewise rewarded with manumission. Rewards were given publicly by the quaestor with funds taken from the public treasury to those who brought proscribed heads, called percussores.

Proscribed men were usually beheaded, because rewards were only given for severed heads. The head of the most prominent of Sulla's enemies were paraded in the streets, then displayed on the rostra—the platform on the forum where orators spoke. Some victims were also brought alive to Sulla and beheaded in an official manner with an axe, as with captured barbarians. Sulla had himself performed such executions in Asia against Ephesians that had revolted; likewise, Pompey personally killed several Marian leaders at Asculum and even the proscribed ex-consul Gnaeus Papirius Carbo. The place of execution was near the Servilius Lacus, a fountain on the Forum, where some heads were also displayed. Headless corpses were sometimes mutilated, then dragged by a hook and thrown in the river Tiber. One of the most active executants of the proscription, Catiline, notoriously inflicted gruesome mutilations on Gratidianus. Sulla had officially asked Catiline to hunt the proscribed. The main goal of the decapitation and mutilations was to further humiliate the victims beyond death, as Romans believed that physical integrity was necessary for afterlife. Burial was forbidden for the same reason; the proscription edict may have contained a clause denying burial for the victims.

Sulla systematically confiscated the properties of his enemies, even before the beginning of the proscription. People hit by this punishment, even though they were not on the proscription list, were simply labelled adversarii. Any person who killed a proscribed man was entitled to keep part of his estate (the remainder went to the state).

=== Profiteers ===
The main percussores were freedmen, because when Sulla captured his enemies' slaves, he often granted manumission to the ablest ones, who became his loyal henchmen. Appian writes that he had the outstanding number of 10,000 freedmen. Giving the procedure a particularly sinister character in the public eye was that many of the proscribed men, escorted from their homes at night by groups of men all named "Lucius Cornelius", never appeared again. This gave rise to a general fear of being taken from one's home at night as a consequence of any outwardly seditious behaviour.

The most well known freedman was Lucius Cornelius Chrysogonus. Another one named Cornelius Phagita commanded forces in Sabine territory to catch Sulla's enemies; he may have arrested the young Julius Caesar (who was not proscribed and only summoned for interrogation). According to Plutarch, Caesar escaped with a bribe of 48,000 sesterces, the reward for a proscribed person's head. Such bribes were a quick source of wealth for Sulla's freedmen. It seems that Caesar's propaganda later exaggerated his hardships during the proscription. who mentions Suetonius as an instance of this propaganda.

Apart from Sulla's freedmen, many Roman citizens made fortunes thanks to the proscription. A former centurion named Lucius Luscius received 144,000 sesterces for three proscribed heads, which grew to a fortune of 10 million sesterces by 64 thanks to shrewd investments. Among major politicians, Marcus Licinius Crassus was the most famous profiteer; his greed in Bruttium was so outrageous that even Sulla refused to confer him political positions in Rome. Crassus' new wealth enabled him to have a very successful career; he joined the three-way alliance later called the First Triumvirate in 59. Although ancient sources are mostly silent on wealth transfers during the proscription, one of the wealthiest men of the Republic like Lucius Domitius Ahenobarbus must have benefited from it. Other men such as Publius Cornelius Cethegus, Gnaeus Cornelius Dolabella and his homonymous cousin, Pompey, Quintus Caecilius Metellus Pius, Quintus Lutatius Catulus, Gaius Scribonius Curio, Gaius Antonius, Gaius Verres, Marcus Aemilius Lepidus, and Quintus Titinius probably profited from the proscription because of their influence in the 70s. Sulla's relatives likewise took a large share of the proscribed's properties, which were sold well under their real value, or sometimes offered by Sulla. His daughter Cornelia bought the former villa of Marius in Miseno at the discount price of 300,000 sesterces and sold it soon after to Lucullus for 2,000,800 sesterces. From this figure of a 85% discount on the proscribed's properties, François Hinard inferred that the overall change of wealth that followed the proscription amounted to 2.3 billion sesterces. With a different calculation, Israel Shatzman reaches the sum of 1.88 billion sesterces. C. F. Konrad considers that the wealth transfers that followed the proscription were "the most radical redistribution of property in Roman history – to that point".

Sulla's proscription was bureaucratically overseen, and the names of informers and those who profited from killing proscribed men were entered into the public record.

Many victims of the proscription were caught because of their wealth rather than their political background, as Sulla expected rich men to produce swift and demonstrative proofs of allegiance. When failing to do so, their wealth made them easy targets for Sulla. Marius had done the same in 87 when he returned to Rome after Sulla's departure to the East.

=== Survivors ===
Several men survived the proscription, thanks to bribes or help from Sulla's lieutenants, sometimes from Sulla himself. For instance, although fourth on the list and unrepentant, the consul for 83, Scipio Asiagenus, was allowed to go into exile to Massalia, where he was still alive in 57. He owed his life to his illustrious lineage, as Sulla did not want to kill such a prestigious name. The difference is striking with Scipio's former consular colleague Gaius Norbanus, who had fled to Rhodes, but committed suicide when Sulla forced the Rhodians to surrender him.

One quarter (18 of 75) of the known proscribed survived by escaping Italy and joining Quintus Sertorius, a prominent Marian general who had continued the resistance against Sulla in Spain. The length of the Sertorian War (80–72) can partially be explained by the impossibility for its proscribed leaders to recover their former status at Rome. Sertorius was finally murdered in 72/73 BC by his fellow proscribed, who were later all executed by Pompey, except Aufidius, who had likely made a deal with him. Aufidius was nevertheless not rehabilitated and died in misery in a Spanish town. Other proscribed fled to Mithridates, which explains the contacts between the king and Sertorius. Many of them died at the battle of Lemnos in 73, even though only Marcus Varius is mentioned in ancient sources.

Only six proscribed still alive after 72 are known: Scipio, Aufidius, Aulus Trebonius, Gnaeus Decidius, Lucius Fidustius, and Lucius Cornelius Cinna (the son of Cinna). The latter two were notably proscribed again during the proscription of the Second Triumvirate in 43.

=== Rehabilitation ===
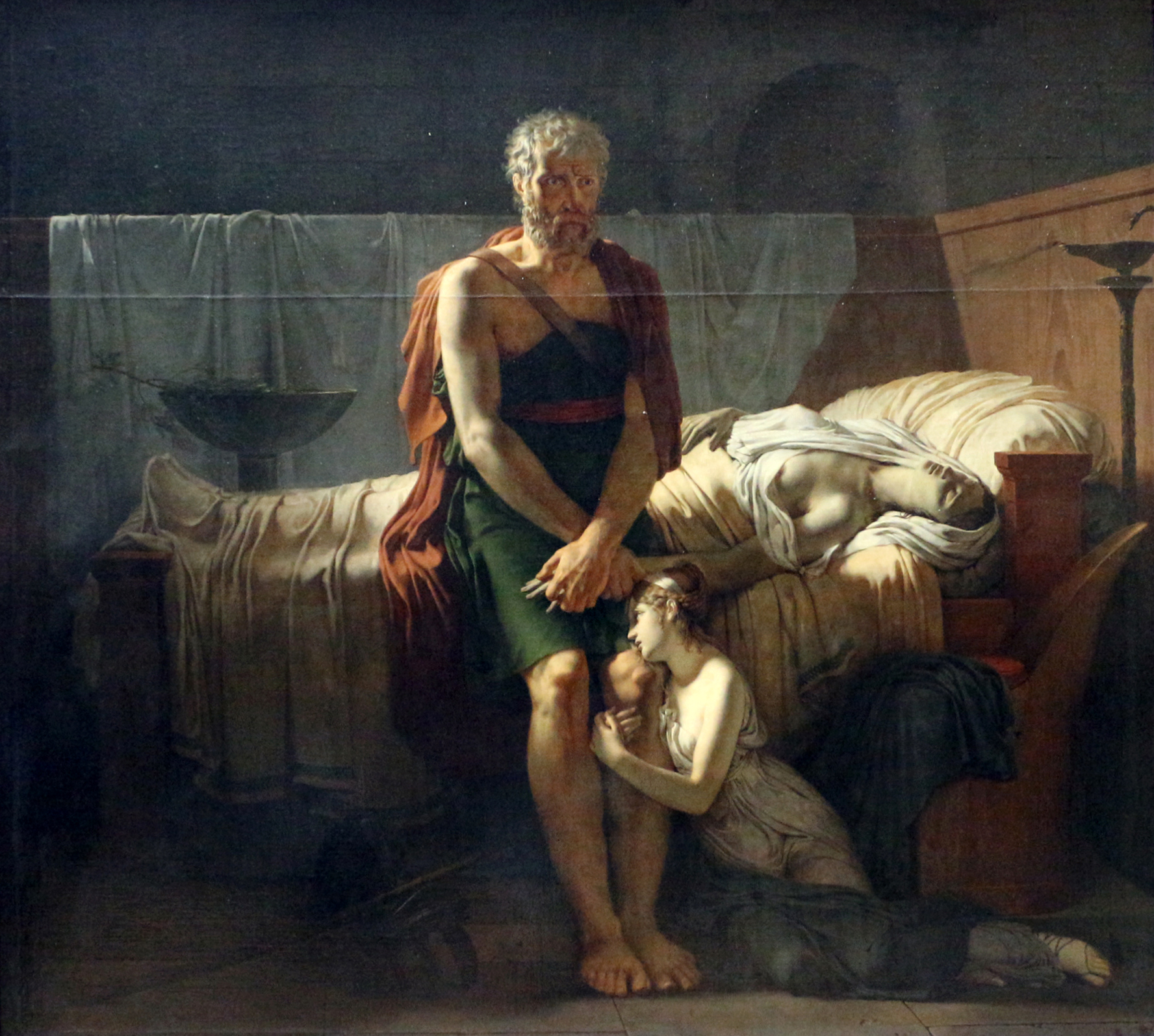
A 1799 painting of Pierre-Narcisse Guérin depicting the fictional Marcus Sextus, returning to his home after his proscription by Sulla, an allusion to the Terror in Revolutionary France.

Possibly in 70, a lex Plautia was passed by a tribune of the plebs named Plautius with the support of Julius Caesar, who was the brother-in-law of the younger Cinna. It probably contained an amnesty for the supporters of the rebellions of Aemilius Lepidus in 78 and Sertorius, in which many proscribed are found. The lex Plautia granted asylum in some cities to the proscribed, while the main disposition of the lex Cornelia remained in place. The law also allowed descendants of proscribed to return to Rome, but it deprived them from most of their political rights: they could not run for offices or even launch a judicial accusation. Therefore, the purpose of the law was to alleviate the living conditions of the proscribed and their family, but also to prevent them from taking their revenge in the courts.

Because Roman law could criminalise acts ex post facto in 64, Marcus Porcius Cato and Julius Caesar launched prosecutions against several percussores, but their action appears limited. Only minor figures such as L. Luscius and L. Bellienus were condemned. Although accused, Catilina was acquitted, probably because he was ranked too high among former supporters of Sulla. The following year, the tribune of the plebs Servilius Rullus put forward several ambitious bills, including one to restore the political rights of proscribed's sons and another on an agrarian reform. Cicero, one of the consuls for 63, decisively fought the bills by focusing on the agrarian reform, which was the easiest to attack. Its abandonment led to the withdrawal of the other bills. Cicero's main argument against an amnesty law, which he had already developed against the lex Plautia of 70, was that the former proscribed would take their revenge against their enemies and that would cause chaos in the Republic. The failure of the amnesty law closed any hope of rehabilitation for the proscribed and their descendants. It explains why some of them were involved in the conspiracy of Catilina, even though he had been one of the most violent agents of the proscription.

Afterwards, some liberi proscriptorum (descendants of proscribed) were present in the circle of Julius Caesar, such as the younger Cinna, the future consuls Gaius Carrinas, Lucius Marcius Censorinus, Gaius Norbanus Flaccus, and Gaius Vibius Pansa Caetronianus. Once he took control of Rome in 49, Caesar asked Mark Antony to pass a law—the lex Antonia de proscriptorum liberis—to restore the political rights of the proscribed's sons, especially their right to run for magistracies. The lex Antonia nevertheless did not restore their properties, because it would have made Caesar's own acquisitions during the civil war challengeable later. Instead, Caesar gave the liberi proscriptorum the properties he had seized from his Pompeian enemies.

Some liberi proscriptorum might have recovered their full citizen status before 49, such as the famous Marcus Junius Brutus. Although his homonymous father had been proscribed like two other members of his family, Brutus was able to start his political career without hindrance in the 50s thanks to his adoption by Quintus Servilius Caepio in 59, because he was technically no longer the son of a proscribed. Likewise, the father of the consul of 43 Gaius Vibius Pansa Caetronianus might have benefited from a similar tactical adoption.

The proscription of Sulla served as model for the proscription of the Second Triumvirate in 43 BC.

== List ==
Hinard has recovered the names of 75 out of the over 520 men who were proscribed, including 51 senators and 24 equites.

| Name | Rank | Fate | Comment |
|---|---|---|---|
| Sextus Alfenus | Eques | Lost his properties | Supporter of the Marians. |
| Lucius Antistius | Eques | Executed in 82 | Professional accuser (delator) before. |
| Marcus Antonius | Senator | Died in 72 | He fled to Sertorius in Spain, member of the conspiracy against him in 72. |
| Quintus Antonius Balbus | Praetor | Killed in battle in 82 | Died in battle against Lucius Marcius Philippus in Sardinia. |
| Sextus Appuleius | Senator | Unknown | Proscription inferred from the delayed career of his son. Apparently not related to Saturninus. |
| Aufidius | Eques | Survived | The only murderer of Sertorius to survive, perhaps thanks to a deal passed with Pompey. |
| Quintus Aurelius | Eques | Executed in 82 | Found out that he was proscribed while reading the list, and was murdered on the spot. |
| Aulus Aurius Melinus | Eques | Executed in 82 or 81 | Quattuorvir of Larinum, murdered by Oppianicus. |
| Aulus Aurius | Eques | Executed in 82 or 81 | Quattuorvir of Larinum, murdered by Oppianicus. |
| Gaius Aurius | Eques | Executed in 82 or 81 | Quattuorvir of Larinum, murdered by Oppianicus. |
| Baebius | Senator | Executed in 82 | |
| Burrienus | Praetor | Executed in 82 | Praetor urbanus in 83. |
| Quintus Caecilius | Eques | Executed in 82 | Murdered by Catilina, who—according to Cicero—was also his brother-in-law. |
| Gaius Carrinas | Praetor | Executed in 82 | Etruscan. Beheaded the day after the battle of the Colline Gate, therefore dead before the publication of the list. |
| Titus Cloelius | Senator | Unknown | Triumvir monetalis in 98, his coins show his support of Marius. |
| Lucius Considius or Consius | Senator | Executed in 82 | Praetor of Capua after its refoundation by the Marians. |
| Lucius Cornelius Cinna | Senator | Survived | Son of Cinna, supporter of Lepidus in 78, he joined Sertorius. Brother-in-law of Caesar, he was rehabilitated in 49; he became praetor in 44 thanks to Caesar, but married Pompey's daughter and supported Caesar's murderers. He was proscribed again in 43. |
| Lucius Cornelius Scipio Asiagenus | Consul | Exiled | Consul in 83, he refused to rejoin Sulla and went into exile in Massalia, where he was still alive in 57. He was probably spared because of his illustrious family. He was 4th in the list. |
| Lucius Cornelius Scipio Aemilianus | Senator | Killed in 77 | Natural son of Lepidus, the consul of 77, he was adopted by Scipio, the consul of 83. Left alive with Scipio in 82, he followed Lepidus in the revolt of 77, but was captured and executed. |
| Lucius Critonius | Aedile | Unknown | Aedile between 86 and 82, his proscription inferred from the delayed career of his son. |
| Gaius? Curtius | Eques | Unknown | Delator in the 80s, his proscription inferred from the delayed career of his son. |
| Gnaeus Decidius | Eques | Survived | He was saved by Cluentius and Caesar may have helped him to recover his properties. He was still alive in 66. |
| Domitius | Senator? | Executed | Identification is difficult, he was perhaps the brother of Marcus Domitius Calvinus, praetor in 80. |
| Gnaeus Domitius Ahenobarbus | Promagistrate | Executed in 81 | He married Cinna's daughter. Pompey probably murdered him after he lost a battle in Africa. |
| Lucius Fabius Hispaniensis | Senator | Died in 72 | Quaestor in 81, he joined Sertorius in Spain, member of the conspiracy against him in 72. |
| Lucius Fidustius | Senator | Survived | He survived the first proscription, but was proscribed again in 43 by Antony and murdered. |
| Quintus Granius | Senator | Unknown | Public enemy in 88 with Marius, he was possibly proscribed by Sulla, as his probable son only became quaestor in 46. |
| Gutta | Senator | Killed in battle in 82 | Died at Praeneste in 82, before the publication of the list. His brother Titus was a senator of Sulla. |
| Gaius Herennius | Senator | Killed in battle in 75 | Tribune of the plebs in 88, he was opposed to Sulla. He fled to Sertorius and was killed by Pompey in the battle of Valentia. |
| Lucius Hirtuleius | Senator | Killed in battle in 75 | Brother of Quintus, he joined Sertorius and died in the battle of Saguntum. |
| Quintus Hirtuleius | Senator | Killed in battle in 75 | Brother of Lucius, he joined Sertorius and died in the battle of Saguntum. |
| Gaius Insteius | Senator | Unknown | Younger brother of Lucius. Served under Sertorius. |
| Lucius Insteius | Senator | Unknown | Older brother of Gaius. Served under Sertorius. |
| Marcus Junius Brutus | Praetor | Suicide in 82 | Praetor in 88, he opposed Sulla during his March on Rome, who then declared him public enemy. He commanded a fleet in 82, but cornered by the Pompeian fleet he committed suicide. |
| Marcus Junius Brutus | Tribune of the plebs | Executed in 77 | Tribune of the plebs in 83, he continued the fight in Gaul like Sertorius in Spain. He rallied with Lepidus in 78, but was captured by Pompey in 77 and put to death. |
| Lucius Junius Brutus Damasippus | Praetor | Executed in 82 | An extreme Marian, he was Praetor urbanus in 83 and commanded armies against Sulla in Pompey. He was captured after the battle of the Colline Gate and executed. |
| Publius Laetorius | Senator | Executed in 82 | Executed just after Gratidianus. |
| Marcus Lamponius | Senator | Executed in 82 | Perhaps appointed by Marius to the senate, he fought at the battle of the Colline Gate. |
| Lucius Livius Salinator | Senator | Killed in battle in 82-81 | Perhaps quaestor, he followed Sertorius in Spain. He died in battle against Gaius Annius sent by Sulla to fight Sertorius. |
| Lollius | Eques | Executed in 82 | Found out that he was proscribed while reading the list, and was murdered on the spot. |
| Quintus Lucretius Vespillo | Senator | Executed in 82 | |
| Maecenas | Eques | Died in 72 | Fled to Sertorius, member of the conspiracy against him in 72. |
| Manlius | Senator | Died in 72 | Fled to Sertorius, member of the conspiracy against him in 72. |
| Mammius | Eques | Executed in 82 | Former delator. Executed in the Lacus Servilius. |
| Gaius Marcius Censorinus | Senator | Executed in 82 | Murderer of the consul Gnaeus Octavius in 87, he was captured after the battle of the Colline Gate and beheaded the next day. |
| Lucius Marcius Censorinus | Senator | Unknown | Brother of Gaius, his proscription is inferred from the delayed career of his son. |
| Marius | Eques | Executed in 82 | Former delator. Executed in the Lacus Servilius. |
| Gaius Marius | Consul | Died in 82 | Son of Gaius Marius, seven times consul. Elected consul in 82, he died in Praeneste while besieged by Sulla. He was 2nd on the list. |
| Marcus Marius Gratidianus | Praetor | Executed in 82 | Nephew of Gaius Marius. Praetor in 85 and 82, he was tortured to death by Catilina or Catulus. |
| Nannius | Eques | Executed in 82 | Murdered by Catilina. His name is uncertain, he could also have been Nonius, Mannius, Ninnius, or Fannius. |
| Gaius Norbanus | Consul | Exiled, then suicide | Consul in 83, he managed to flee to Rhodes, but committed suicide when Sulla demanded his capture from the Rhodians. He was 3rd on the list. |
| Gaius Norbanus | Senator | Survived | Son of the consul of 83. Father of the consul of 38. |
| Gaius Octavius Graecinus | Senator | Died in 72 | Fled to Sertorius, member of the conspiracy against him in 72. |
| Gnaeus Papirius Carbo | Consul | Executed in 82 | Three times consul (85, 84, 82). He was the leader of the Marians after the death of Cinna in 84. After his defeat, he fled to Sicily, but was caught by Pompey in the end of 82, who beheaded him. He was first on the list. |
| Gaius Papius Mutilus | Senator? | Suicide | Perhaps the Samnite leader defeated by Sulla during the Social War. He committed suicide in his wife's house at Teanum. |
| Marcus Perperna Veiento | Praetor | Executed in 72 | Unlike his father, the consul of 92, he refused to rally Sulla. He later joined Lepidus, then Sertorius. In 72, he organised the murder of Sertorius, but he was captured and executed by Pompey. |
| Perperna? | Senator | Executed in 72 | Nephew of Marcus Perperna, he followed him and joined Sertorius. His uncle killed him after the murder of Sertorius in 72. He was possibly the son of the praetor's sister; if so, he had a different name. |
| Marcus Plaetorius | Senator | Executed in 82 | Executed just after Gratidianus. |
| Pontius Telesinus | Senator | Executed in 82 | Samnite general during the Social War, during which he fought Sulla. Captured in 82, he was beheaded with Carrinas. |
| Pontius Telesinus | Senator | Died in 82 | Younger brother of the Samnite leader, he was with the younger Marius in Praeneste and died with him. |
| Quinctius | Eques | Unknown | Legate of Gnaeus Papirius Carbo in 82. |
| Sextius Saltius | Senator | Executed in 82 | Praetor of Capua after its refoundation by the Marians. |
| Marcus? Sergius | Eques | Executed in 82 | Brother of Catilina, who placed him on the proscription list. Perhaps a confusion with the story of Quintus Caecilius. |
| Quintus Sertorius | Proconsul | Murdered in 73/72 | Successful general in Spain between 97 and 93. Having served under Gaius Marius for a time, he declared for the Cinna-Marian faction in 87 due to Sulla's hostility to him. Left to Spain in 83, where he took command of the resistance against Rome, until his murder in 73/72 by Perperna and his other subordinates. |
| Lucius Tanusius | Eques | Executed in 82 | Murdered by Catilina and his Gallic henchmen. |
| Gaius Tarquitius Priscus | Senator | Executed in 72 | Either the senator (son of Lucius) mentioned in the concilium of Pompeius Strabo in 89, or the quaestor (son of Publius) of Gaius Annius in 82. Part of Sertorius' murder in 72, executed soon after. |
| Gnaeus Titinius | Eques | Executed in 82 | Murdered by Catilina and his Gallic henchmen. |
| Aulus Trebonius | Eques | Survived | Trebonius survived, because he could not inherit when his brother Publius (who had not been proscribed) died in 75. |
| Quintus Valerius Soranus | Tribune of the plebs | Executed in 82 | Tribune of the plebs in 82, executed by Pompey in Sicily. |
| Marcus Varius | Senator | Executed in 73 | Probably brother of Quintus Varius, he fled to Sertorius, who sent him to Asia to help Mithridates. He was defeated and killed by Lucullus after the battle of Lemnos. |
| Venuleius | Eques | Executed in 82 | Executed just after Gratidianus. |
| Versius | Eques | Executed in 72 | Part of Sertorius' murder in 72, executed soon after. |
| Sextus Vibius | Senator | Executed in 82 or 81 | Quattuorvir of Larinum, murdered by Oppianicus. |
| Gaius Vibius Pansa | Senator | Survived | A Gaius Vibius Pansa was tribune of the plebs in 51. Therefore either the proscribed of 82 was another man, or he escaped the ban on magistracy through adoption by a Caetronius (hence the cognomen of the consul of 43 Gaius Vibius Pansa Caetronianus). |
| Marcus Volumnius | Senator | Executed in 82 | Murdered by Catilina. |

== Bibliography ==
- Ernst Badian, "Marius' Villas", The Testimony of the Slave and the Knave", The Journal of Roman Studies, Vol. 63, 1973, pp. 121–132.
- Michael Crawford, Roman Republican Coinage, Cambridge University Press, 1974. ISBN 9780521074926
- Thomas E. Crow, Emulation, David, Drouais, and Girodet in the Art of Revolutionary France, New Haven, Yale University Press, 2006. ISBN 9780300117394
- Gruen, Erich S. (1978). Roman Politics and the Criminal Courts, 149–78 B.C. Cambridge, MA: Harvard University Press. ISBN 0-674-28420-8.
- Hinard, François (1985). Les proscriptions de la Rome républicaine (in French). Rome: Ecole française de Rome. ISBN 2728300941.
- ——, Rome, la dernière république, Recueil d'articles de François Hinard, textes réunis et présentés par Estelle Bertrand, Ausonius, Pessac, 2011. ISBN 9782356130426
- C. F. Konrad, "From the Gracchi to the First Civil War (133–70)" in Nathan Rosenstein & Robert Morstein-Marx, A Companion to the Roman Republic, Oxford, Blackwell, 2006, pp. 167–189. ISBN 978-1444334135
- Bruce Marshall, "Catilina and the Execution of M. Marius Gratidianus", The Classical Quarterly, Vol. 35, No. 1 (1985), pp. 124–133.
- Silvestre Mirys, Figures de l'histoire de la République romaine accompagnées d'un précis historique, première partie, Paris, An VIII.
- Robert Morstein-Marx, Julius Caesar and the Roman people, Cambridge University Press, 2021. ISBN 9781108837842
- Christopher Pelling, Plutarch Caesar: Translated with an Introduction and Commentary, Oxford University Press, 2011. ISBN 9780198149040
- Rolf Reichardt & Hubertus Kohle, Visualizing the Revolution, Politics and Pictorial Arts in Late Eighteenth century France, London, Reaktion Books, 2008. ISBN 978 1 86189 312 3
- Federico Santangelo, Sulla, the Elites and the Empire, A Study of Roman Policies in Italy and the Greek East, Leiden/Boston, Brill, 2007. ISBN 9789004163867
- Robin Seager, "Sulla", in J. A Crook, Andrew Lintott, Elizabeth Rawson, The Cambridge Ancient History, vol. IX, The Last Age of the Roman Republic, 146–43 B.C., Cambridge University Press, 1992, pp. 165–207. ISBN 0521256038
- Israël Shatzman, Senatorial Wealth and Roman Politics, Bruxelles, Latomus, 1975.
