= Battle of Italica =

75 BCE battle, Sertorian War

- Part of the Sertorian War
| Date | 75 BC |
| Location | near Seville in Spain 37°26′38″N 6°02′48″W |
| Result | Roman victory |

Belligerents
| Roman Republic | Sertorian Rebels |

Commanders and leaders
| Quintus Caecilius Metellus Pius | Lucius Hirtuleius |

Strength
| 4 understrength legions and an unknown number of auxiliaries and allied troops | Unknown but similar to Metellus' force |

Casualties and losses
| Unknown but significantly lower than their opponents | 20,000 |
- Location within Spain

The Battle of Italica was fought in 75 BC between a rebel army under the command of Lucius Hirtuleius a legate of the Roman rebel Quintus Sertorius and a Roman Republican army under the command of the Roman general and proconsul of Hispania Ulterior Quintus Caecilius Metellus Pius. The battle was fought near Italica (a Roman colony in Spain) and ended in a stunning victory for the Metellan army.

== Background ==
In 88 BC, Lucius Cornelius Sulla marched his legions on Rome, starting a period of civil wars. Quintus Sertorius, a client of Gaius Marius, joined his patron's faction and took up the sword against the Sullan faction (mainly optimates). After the death of Lucius Cornelius Cinna and Gaius Marius, Sertorius lost faith with his factions leadership. In 82 BC, during the war against Sulla, he left Italy for his assigned province in Hispania. Unfortunately his faction lost the war in Italy right after his departure and in 81 BC Sulla sent Gaius Annius Luscus with several legions to take the Iberian provinces from Sertorius. After a brief resistance Sertorius and his men are expelled from Hispania. They ended up in Mauretania in north-western Africa where they conquered the city of Tingis. Here the Lusitanians, a fierce Iberian tribe who were about to be invaded by a Sullan governor, approached him. They asked him to become their war leader in the fight against the Sullans.

In 80 BC Sertorius landed at the little fishing town of Baelo near the Pillars of Hercules (Gibraltar) and returned to Hispania. Soon after his landing he fought and defeated the Sullan general Lucius Fufidius (the aforementioned Sullan governor) at the Baetis river. After this he defeated several Sullan armies and drove his opponents from Hispania.

Threatened by Sertorius' success the Senate in Rome upgraded Hispania Ulterior to a proconsular province and sent the proconsul Quintus Caecilius Metellus Pius with a large army to fight him. Sertorius used guerrilla tactics so effectively he wore down Metellus to the point of exhaustion while Sertorius' legate Lucius Hirtuleius defeated the governor of Hispania Citerior Marcus Domitius Calvinus. In 76 BC the government in Rome decided to send Pompey and an even larger army to help Metellus. In the same year Sertorius is joined by Marcus Perpenna, who brought him the remnants of the army of Marcus Aemilius Lepidus the rebel consul of 78 BC. Thus reinforced Sertorius decided to try and take the Iberian east coast (because the cities there support his enemies). His first target was the city of Lauron where, against Pompey, Sertorius showed himself to be the better general. Sertorius' forces massacred a large part of Pompey's army (see: the Battle of Lauron).

== Prelude ==
In 75 BC, Sertorius decided to take on Metellus and leave the battered Pompey to his legates Perpenna and Gaius Herennius. Pompey however defeated his opponents in a battle near Valentia and forced Sertorius to come and take charge of the situation, leaving Hirtuleius to deal with Metellus. Metellus and Hirtuleius were campaigning near the Roman colony of Italica when Hirtuleius made the mistake of trying to force his opponent into a pitched battle.

== The battle ==
Hirtuleius mustered his army some time soon after dawn and marched on Metellus's encampment trying to provoke his opponent into battle. Metellus kept his troops in his camp behind their entrenchments until noon. It was extremely hot and Hirtuleius's troops were soon sweltering out in the open while Metellus's legionaries remained relatively fresh. Since his enemy remained drawn up in front of his camp for hours, Metellus had plenty of time to study their dispositions and make his own plans accordingly. He observed that Hirtuleius had posted his strongest units in the centre of his battle line and decided to use this to his advantage. When the battle finally commenced Metellus held back his own centre and concentrated on winning on the flanks. After routing their opponents his flanks he enveloped Hirtuleius centre. This was the classic tactic used by Hannibal at Cannae almost a century and a half ago. It had worked then and it had worked now. Hirtuleius lost 20,000 men at Italica and, chastened, he fled north to join his commander Sertorius who was squaring off against Pompey. Metellus was right on his heels wanting to make the most of his victory by trapping Sertorius between Pompey and himself.

== Aftermath ==
With Hirtuleius' army destroyed Metellus and Pompey had the opportunity to catch Sertorius between themselves. Metellus marched his army north to fall on Sertorius' rear, unfortunately Pompey decided to take Sertorius on before Metellus arrived and almost lost his army and life at the Battle of Sucro. When Metellus finally arrived Sertorius retreated toward Clunia in Celtiberia and reverted to guerrilla warfare. The war would drag on for another three years and only end because a few of his own men plotted against Sertorius and assassinated him.
