= 75 BC =

75 BC in various calendars
- Gregorian calendar: 75 BC; LXXV BC
- Ab urbe condita: 679
- Ancient Egypt era: XXXIII dynasty, 249
- Pharaoh: Ptolemy XII Auletes, 6
- Ancient Greek Olympiad (summer): 176th Olympiad, year 2
- Assyrian calendar: 4676
- Balinese saka calendar: N/A
- Bengali calendar: −668 – −667
- Berber calendar: 876
- Buddhist calendar: 470
- Burmese calendar: −712
- Byzantine calendar: 5434–5435
- Chinese calendar: 乙巳年 (Wood Snake); 2623 or 2416 — to — 丙午年 (Fire Horse); 2624 or 2417
- Coptic calendar: −358 – −357
- Discordian calendar: 1092
- Ethiopian calendar: −82 – −81
- Hebrew calendar: 3686–3687
- Hindu calendars
- Vikram Samvat: −18 – −17
- Shaka Samvat: N/A
- Kali Yuga: 3026–3027
- Holocene calendar: 9926
- Iranian calendar: 696 BP – 695 BP
- Islamic calendar: 717 BH – 716 BH
- Javanese calendar: N/A
- Julian calendar: N/A
- Korean calendar: 2259
- Minguo calendar: 1986 before ROC 民前1986年
- Nanakshahi calendar: −1542
- Seleucid era: 237/238 AG
- Thai solar calendar: 468–469
- Tibetan calendar: ཤིང་མོ་སྦྲུལ་ལོ་ (female Wood-Snake); 52 or −329 or −1101 — to — མེ་ཕོ་རྟ་ལོ་ (male Fire-Horse); 53 or −328 or −1100

Year 75 BC was a year of the pre-Julian Roman calendar. At the time it was known as the Year of the Consulship of Octavius and Cotta (or, less frequently, year 679 Ab urbe condita). The denomination 75 BC for this year has been used since the early medieval period, when the Anno Domini calendar era became the prevalent method in Europe for naming years.

== Events ==
=== By place ===
==== Roman Republic ====
- In Rome, the tribune Quintus Opimius speaks out against Sullan restrictions on the tribunate, in orations noted for sarcasm against conservatives.
- Cicero is quaestor in Western Sicily.
- Nicomedes IV of Bithynia bequeaths his kingdom to Rome on his death (75/4 BC). Angered by the arrangement, Mithridates VI of Pontus declares war on Rome and invades Bithynia, Cappadocia and Paphlagonia, thus starting the Third Mithridatic War.
- Third Mithridatic War: Marcus Aurelius Cotta is defeated by Mithridates in the Battle of Chalcedon.
- Julius Caesar travels to Rhodes and is taken captive by pirates
- In the Roman province of Hispania Citerior a republican army under Pompey the Great defeats an army of Sertorian rebels at the Battle of Valentia.
- In the Roman province of Hispania Ulterior a republican army under Quintus Caecilius Metellus Pius defeats an army of Sertorian rebels at the Battle of Italica.
- In the Roman province of Hispania Citerior an army of Sertorian rebels under Quintus Sertorius himself defeats a republican army under Pompey the Great at the Battle of Sucro.
- At the Battle of Saguntum the republican forces on the Iberian Peninsula and the Sertorian rebels fight each other to a draw. Quintus Sertorius is forced to withdraw leaving the battlefield to Pompey and Metellus (the republican commanders).

==== Greece ====
- Julius Caesar travels to Rhodes to study under Apollonius Molon. On his way across the Aegean Sea, he is kidnapped by Cilician pirates and held prisoner in the Dodecanese islet of Pharmacusa. The young Caesar is held for a ransom of twenty talents, but he insists they ask for fifty. After his release Caesar raises a fleet at Miletus, pursues and crucifies the pirates in Pergamon.

=== By topic ===
==== Literature ====
- Start of Golden Age of Latin Literature.

== Births ==
- Calpurnia, Roman noblewoman and wife of Julius Caesar
- Gaius Asinius Pollio, Roman politician and poet (d. AD 4)
- Yuan of Han, Chinese emperor of the Han Dynasty (d. 33 BC)

== Deaths ==
- Gaius Herennius, tribune of the plebs in 80 BC and legate to Quintus Sertorius during the Sertorian War, killed at the Battle of Valentia.
- Lucius Hirtuleius, right-hand-man of Quintus Sertorius during the Sertorian War, killed at the Battle of Saguntum.
- Gaius Memmius, brother-in-law of Pompey the Great, died at the Battle of Saguntum.
