= Battle of Sucro =

75 BCE battle, Sertorian War

- Part of the Sertorian War
Date	75 BC
Location	on the banks of the Sucro river 39°9′50″N 0°15′6″W
Result	Draw (each side lost one of its wing’s)

Belligerents
Sertorian rebels	Roman Senate

Commanders and leaders
Sertorius	Pompey; Lucius Afranius

Strength
Unknown but similar to Pompey's	6 understrength legions and an unknown number of auxiliaries and allied troops

Casualties and losses
10,000	10,000
- Location within Spain

The Battle of Sucro was fought in 75 BC between a rebel army under the command of the Roman rebel Quintus Sertorius and a Roman army under the command of the Roman general Pompey. The battle was fought on the banks of the river Sucro near a town bearing the same name (present day Albalat de la Ribera). It ended indecisively: with Sertorius winning a tactical victory but having to withdraw because Pompey's colleague Metellus and his army were approaching.

== Background ==
In 88 BC, Lucius Cornelius Sulla marched his legions on Rome, starting a series of civil wars. Quintus Sertorius, a client of Gaius Marius, joined his patron's faction and took up the sword against the Sullan faction (mainly optimates). After the death of Lucius Cornelius Cinna and Gaius Marius, Sertorius lost faith with his factions leadership. In 82 BC, during the war against Sulla, he left Italy for his assigned province in Hispania. Unfortunately his faction lost the war in Italy right after his departure and in 81 BC Sulla sent Gaius Annius Luscus with several legions to take the Iberian provinces from Sertorius. After a brief resistance Sertorius and his men are expelled from Hispania. They ended up in Mauretania in north-western Africa where they conquer the city of Tingis. Here the Lusitanians, a fierce Iberian tribe who were about to be invaded by a Sullan governor, approached him. They asked him to become their war leader in the fight against the Sullans. In 80 BC, Sertorius landed at the little fishing town of Baelo near the Pillars of Hercules (Gibraltar) and returned to Hispania. Soon after his landing he fought and defeated the Sullan general Lucius Fufidius (the aforementioned Sullan governor) at the Baetis river. After this he defeated several Sullan armies and drove his opponents from Hispania.

Threatened by Sertorius' success the Senate in Rome upgraded Hispania Ulterior to a proconsular province and sent the proconsul Quintus Caecilius Metellus Pius with a large army to fight him. Sertorius used guerrilla tactics so effectively he wore down Metellus while Sertorius' legate Lucius Hirtuleius defeated the governor of Hispania Citerior Marcus Domitius Calvinus. In 76 BC, the government in Rome decided to send Pompey and an even larger army to help Metellus. In the same year (76), Sertorius is joined by Marcus Perpenna, who brought him the remnants of the army of Marcus Aemilius Lepidus the rebel consul of 78 BC. Thus reinforced Sertorius decided to try and take the Iberian east coast (because the cities there support his enemies). His first target was the city of Lauron where he outwitted Pompey and massacred a large part of his army (see: the battle of Lauron). In 75 BC Sertorius decided to take on Metellus and leave the battered Pompey to his legates Perpenna and Gaius Herennius. Pompey defeated his opponents in a battle near Valentia and forced Sertorius to come and take charge of the situation. Metellus used the change in command to defeat Hirtuleius whom Sertorius had left in charge at the Battle of Italica and marched after Sertorius. Pompey and Sertorius, not wanting to wait for Metellus, met at the river Sucro and drew up for battle.

== Prelude ==
The evening before the battle there was a thunderstorm, the entire horizon was lit by lightning flashes. The veteran soldiers of both armies ignored the ominous event and the next day the armies drew up for battle. Each general took station on his right flank, which meant that Sertorius was facing the capable Lucius Afranius, Pompey's second-in-command, while Pompey was facing an unknown subordinate of Sertorius.

== The battle ==
As both sides engaged there was hard fighting all over the line. Halfway through the battle Pompey's wing began to push hard and the enemy's left began to fall back. Sertorius, realizing the danger his army was in, turned over command of fighting Afranius to one of his subordinates and rode over to save his left wing. The presence of Sertorius in their ranks inspired his men. After stabilizing his left Sertorius launched a fierce counter-attack which shattered the Pompeian right. Pompey did his best to stem the tide of his men's retreat and was almost captured by his enemy. He was saved by his horse, not because it carried him to safety but because Sertorius' troops stopped to capture the prized abandoned equine apparition instead of going after its owner. Meanwhile, Afranius had overwhelmed his opponents and had pushed into the Sertorian camp. Now Afranius' men, sure of victory, started pillaging the place. Unfortunately for them Sertorius and the other half of his army now descended on them with a vengeance. Catching them off guard the Sertorians killed many of them. In the meantime Pompey had regrouped most of his army and retreated to his own camp.

Meanwhile, a second Roman army under the command of Metellus Pius, Pompey's colleague, had fought its way through the force Sertorius had left as a rearguard to keep him [Metellus] at bay and was only a good days march away. This meant that, if Sertorius chose to fight Pompey the next day, he would probably end up fighting Metellus as well. Fighting two enemies at once was something Sertorius did not relish. He had lost his chance to take Pompey out of the campaign. His bitter comment has been preserved by Plutarch:

If the old woman had not made an appearance, I'd have trashed the boy and packed him off to Rome.

Despite knocking Pompey out of the battle, Sertorius’ army had suffered a great number of casualties and when Metellus arrived he would be outnumbered. Sertorius decided to retreat toward Clunia in the highlands of Celtiberia. Here he would be among his allies and Pompey and Metellus would have to follow him at their own peril.

== Aftermath ==
Sertorius had fought long and hard for the Iberian east coast but now had no other choice other than concede his conquests. But the war was long from over, Sertorius still had allies, his reputation and an army. He marched into the Celtiberian uplands and reverted to guerrilla warfare again. The war would drag on for another three years and only end because a few of his own men plotted against Sertorius and assassinated him.
