= Transalpine war =

Transalpine war may refer to

- the First Transalpine War (125–121 BCE)
- the Gallic Wars or Second Transalpine War (58–50 BCE)
- certain hostilities in 77 BCE in Gaul involving Pompey (who was on his way to Hispania for the Sertorian War of 80–72 BCE) which Cicero (Cic. Man. 28) called the bellum transalpinum
