= Hirtuleia gens =

Family in ancient Rome

The gens Hirtuleia was a minor plebeian family of equestrian rank at ancient Rome, which appears in history during the final century of the Republic, and under the early Empire.

== Origin ==
The nomen Hirtuleius belongs to a large class of gentilicia formed using the suffix -eius, and frequently of Oscan origin. The root might be hirtulus, perhaps a diminutive of hirtus, hairy or rude, or derived from Hirtius, another gentile name.

== Members ==
This list includes abbreviated praenomina. For an explanation of this practice, see filiation.

- Quintus Hirtuleius L. f., an eques named in an inscription from Rome, dating to 88 BC.
- Hirtuleius, quaestor in an uncertain year, amended the lex Valeria de aere alieno, a law passed by Lucius Valerius Flaccus, consul in 86 BC, which was intended to alleviate a debt crisis by reducing the amount to be paid to creditors to a quadrans, or one fourth of the original sum. Hirtuleius' amendment tripled the amount to be paid, reducing the amount of relief accorded debtors from three quarters of their debts to one quarter.
- Lucius Hirtuleius, a legate of Sertorius in Spain, earned three important victories in 79 BC, defeating first Marcus Domitius Calvinus propraetor of Hispania Citerior, then Thorius, legate of Quintus Caecilius Metellus, and finally Lucius Manlius, propraetor of Gallia Narbonensis. In 75, he was defeated by Metellus, and fell in battle at Segovia.
- Quintus Hirtuleius L. f., served in the Social War under Pompeius Strabo in 89 BC. He was probably the brother of Lucius Hirtuleius, and if so, likely died alongside him.
- Hirtuleia L. f., a woman named in a funerary inscription from Rome, dating to the second quarter of the first century BC, together with Lucius Septimius, master of a temple on the Capitoline Hill.
- Aulus Hirtuleius Asiaticus, made an offering to Aesculapius at Buthrotum in Macedonia, some time in the first century AD.
- Marcus Hirtuleius M. f. Albanus, a soldier serving in the praetorian guard, named in an inscription from Vasio in Gallia Narbonensis.

== See also ==
- List of Roman gentes

== Bibliography ==
- Marcus Tullius Cicero, Pro Fonteio.
- Gaius Sallustius Crispus (Sallust), Historiae (The Histories).
- Titus Livius (Livy), History of Rome.
- Sextus Julius Frontinus, Strategemata.
- Lucius Mestrius Plutarchus (Plutarch), Lives of the Noble Greeks and Romans.
- Paulus Orosius, Historiarum Adversum Paganos (History Against the Pagans).
- Dictionary of Greek and Roman Biography and Mythology, William Smith, ed., Little, Brown and Company, Boston (1849).
- Theodor Mommsen et alii, Corpus Inscriptionum Latinarum (The Body of Latin Inscriptions, abbreviated CIL), Berlin-Brandenburgische Akademie der Wissenschaften (1853–present).
- René Cagnat et alii, L'Année épigraphique (The Year in Epigraphy, abbreviated AE), Presses Universitaires de France (1888–present).
- August Pauly, Georg Wissowa, et alii, Realencyclopädie der Classischen Altertumswissenschaft (Scientific Encyclopedia of the Knowledge of Classical Antiquities, abbreviated RE), J. B. Metzler, Stuttgart (1894–1980).
- George Davis Chase, "The Origin of Roman Praenomina", in Harvard Studies in Classical Philology, vol. VIII, pp. 103–184 (1897).
- T. Robert S. Broughton, The Magistrates of the Roman Republic, American Philological Association (1952–1986).
- François Hinard, Les proscriptions de la Rome républicaine, École française de Rome (1985), ISBN 2-7283-0094-1.
