= Battle of Valentia (75 BC) =

Battle of the Sertorian War

- Part of the Sertorian War
Date	75 BC
Location	Valentia in Spain 39°28′00″N 0°22′30″W
Result	Roman victory

Belligerents
Roman Republic	Sertorian Rebels

Commanders and leaders
Gnaeus Pompeius Magnus (better known as Pompey)	Marcus Perpenna; Gaius Herennius

Strength
6 understrength legions and an unknown number of auxiliaries and allied troops	Unknown but probably similar to Pompey's army

Casualties and losses
Unknown but a lot lighter than their opponents	10,000
- Location within Spain

The Battle of Valentia was fought in 75 BC between a rebel army under the command of Marcus Perpenna Vento and a general called Gaius Herennius, both legates of the Roman rebel Quintus Sertorius, and a Roman Republican army under the command of the Roman general Gnaeus Pompeius Magnus (better known as Pompey the Great). The battle was fought at Valentia in Spain and ended in a stunning victory for the Pompeian army.

== Background ==
In 88 BC, Lucius Cornelius Sulla marched his legions on Rome, starting a period of civil wars. Quintus Sertorius, a client of Gaius Marius, joined his patron's faction and took up the sword against the Sullan faction (mainly optimates). After the death of Lucius Cornelius Cinna and Gaius Marius, Sertorius lost faith with his factions leadership. In 82 BC, during the war against Sulla, he left Italy for his assigned province in Hispania. His faction lost the war in Italy right after his departure and in 81 BC Sulla sent Gaius Annius Luscus with several legions to take the Iberian provinces from Sertorius. After a brief resistance Sertorius and his men are expelled from Hispania. They end up in Mauretania in north-western Africa where they conquer the city of Tingis. Here the Lusitanians, a fierce Iberian tribe who were about to be invaded by a Sullan governor, approached him. They asked him to become their war leader in the fight against the Sullans.

In 80 BC, Sertorius landed at the little fishing town of Baelo near the Pillars of Hercules (Gibraltar) and returned to Hispania. Soon after his landing he fought and defeated the Sullan general Lucius Fufidius (the aforementioned Sullan governor) at the Baetis river. After this, he defeated several Sullan armies and drove his opponents from Hispania. Threatened by Sertorius' success the Senate in Rome upgraded Hispania Ulterior to a proconsular province and sent the proconsul Quintus Caecilius Metellus Pius with a large army to fight him. Sertorius used guerrilla tactics so effectively he wore down Metellus to the point of exhaustion while his legate Lucius Hirtuleius defeated the governor of Hispania Citerior Marcus Domitius Calvinus.

In 76 BC, the government in Rome decided to send Pompey and an even larger army to help Metellus. In the same year Sertorius is joined by Marcus Perpenna, who brought him the remnants of the army of Marcus Aemilius Lepidus the rebel consul of 78 BC. Thus reinforced Sertorius decided to try and take the Iberian east coast (because the cities there support his enemies). His first target was the city of Lauron where he outgeneraled Pompey and massacred a large part of his army (see: the Battle of Lauron).

== Prelude ==
In 75 BC Sertorius decided to take on Metellus and leave the battered Pompey to his legates Perpenna and Gaius Herennius (probably a Samnite noble). Pompey and Metellus repeated their strategy of the previous year. While Metellus returned through the centre of Hispania to the further province, Pompey once more marched his legions south toward the plain of Valentia. This time he met with no serious resistance until he reached Valentia itself. Here he found Herennius and Perpenna holding the line of the river Turia.

== The battle ==
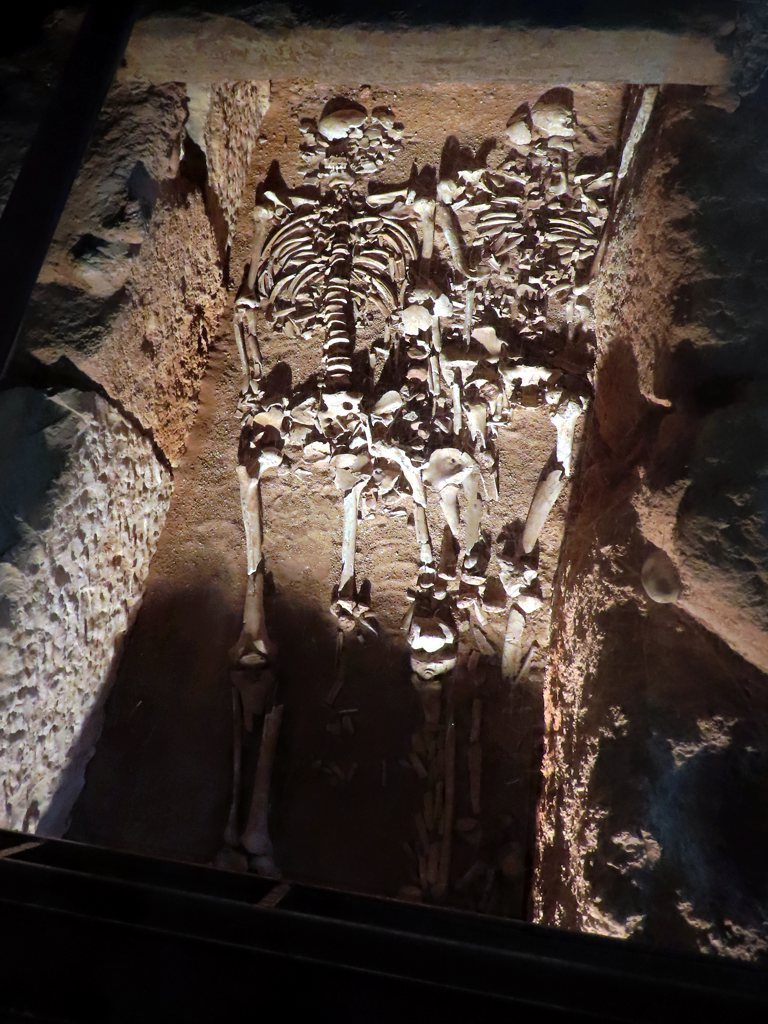
Skeletons of Roman rebel soldiers executed when Pompey sacked Valentia Edetanorum

Perperna and Herennius decided to give battle apparently under the impression they could defeat Pompey in a pitched battle. They fought in the narrow space which separated the river from the city walls. The battlefield gave no distinct tactical advantage to either side, so what developed was a conventional clash of strength, morale and endurance. Pompey's army of battle-hardened veterans totally outclassed and massacred their opponents. Herennius himself was among the 10,000 casualties. Valentia was taken and sacked.

== Aftermath ==
When word reached Sertorius of Herennius and Perpenna's defeat he decided to retrieve the situation in the north himself. He left Hirtuleius in charge of the western campaign against Metellus while he marched north to face Pompey. While Sertorius was en route Hirtuleius made things worse in the south by getting himself drawn into a pitched battle with Metellus near the Roman colony of Italica. At the Battle of Italica Metellus crushed Hirtuleius' army and immediately marched north in pursuit of Sertorius, he wanted to catch Sertorius between himself and Pompey's army. Pompey and Sertorius, both not wanting to wait for Metellus, met at the river Sucro, where Pompey almost lost his army and his life. Sertorius failed to destroy Pompey at the Battle of Sucro, and with Metellus on the way he had no other choice than to march inland and revert to guerrilla warfare. The war would drag on for another three years and only end when a few of his own men plotted against Sertorius and assassinated him.
