= Lucius Hirtuleius =

Ancient Roman, rebel, lieutenant of Sertorius

- Died: 75 BC
- Military career
- Allegiance: Quintus Sertorius
- Rank: Legate
- Conflicts: Sertorian War

Lucius Hirtuleius was a legate of Quintus Sertorius during the Sertorian War, in which he fought from 80 BC until his death in 75 BC. After the death of Julius Salinator, he was considered Sertorius's most trusted lieutenant, his second-in-command, and was often given independent commands. During the war he defeated the Roman governors Marcus Domitius Calvinus and Lucius Manlius.

== Biography ==
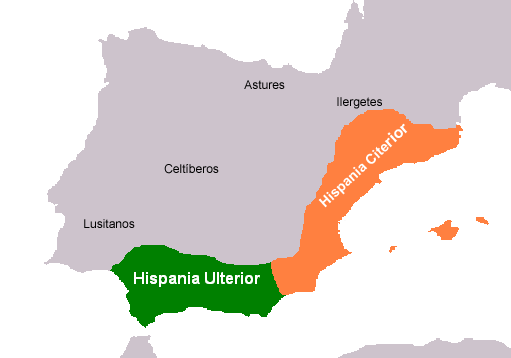
Iberia, showing the Roman Provinces in the time of Hirtuleius.

Not much is known of Hirtuleius's early life and career. He shows up in historical records on the staff of Quintus Sertorius during the latter's propraetorship of the Iberian peninsula. In 82 BC, during Rome's civil war, Sertorius one of the more prominent leaders of the Cinna-Marius faction and those loyal to him, were sent to the Iberian peninsula to establish their faction's rule there. They were driven from the peninsula in 81 BC, but were able to return in 80 BC starting what would become known as the Sertorian War. Hirtuleius was a member of Sertorius's entourage, and helped him establish an independent state in Hispania. He was technically Sertorius' quaestor (though his term of office had long expired).

=== The Sertorian War ===
Hirtuleius became Sertorius's most trusted lieutenant during what was to become the war on the Iberian peninsula. In 80 BC, while Sertorius was consolidating his power in Hispania Ulterior, Hirtuleius was sent against Marcus Domitius Calvinus, the governor of Hispania Citerior, and it was late in the year when Domitius arrived in Ulterior. The following year, Domitius marched south and Hirtuleius resorted to guerrilla warfare, falling back before the enemy and using ambuscades and raids to wear them down. Possibly while combatting Domitius, Hirtuleius dug a ditch in a steep valley and set wooden ramparts in it, which he then set on fire, enabling his escape. Such tactics likely demoralized Domitius' army; eventually, Hirtuleius met Domitius and defeated him at Consabura on the banks of the river Anas. Domitius was slain in the defeat, which helped the Sertorians consolidate their control of Hispania Ulterior.

Sometime later, Hirtuleius besieged the city of Consabura. The inhabitants of Consabura did not yield to Hirtuleius, and he was forced to give up his siege sometime later. In 78 BC, the new governor of Hispania Citerior, Quintus Calidius, showed so little interest in defending the province, that Lucius Manlius, the propraetor of Gallia Transalpina, was called on to intervene by Quintus Caecilius Metellus Pius (who was leading the Senatorial armies against Sertorius), only to be defeated by Hirtuleius at Ilerda. Hirtuleius, in this engagement, outnumbered Manlius, who possessed 3 legions and 1,500 cavalry. Manlius then retreated, but Hirtuleius apparently pursued and besieged him at Ilerda before he eventually escaped across the Pyrenees.

In 76 BC the Senate sent massive reinforcements under the general Gnaeus Pompey Magnus to aid Metellus. When Pompey arrived in Iberia he was outgeneraled and defeated by Sertorius at the Battle of Lauron. Hirtuleius was left in command of the army facing Metellus at this time, but other sources suggest he may have led the Iberians sent by Sertorius who had successfully ravaged one of Pompey's legions. Sertorius gave orders to Hirtuleius not to engage Metellus in a pitched battle, as Sertorius believed he could not match Metellus. The next year Sertorius left Pompey, who had remained in Hispania Citerior with the remnants of his army, to two of his legates, Marcus Perpenna and Gaius Herennius, while he himself campaigned against Metellus in Hispania Ulterior, probably rejoining Hirtuleius. Unfortunately for Sertorius, Perpenna and Herennius were outmaneuvered by Pompey and defeated at the Battle of Valentia; he was now rapidly marching south. Sertorius now raced to Hispania Citerior and took over the command against Pompey, leaving Hirtuleius in command of the army facing Metellus.

==== The Battle of Italica ====
Hirtuleius tried to defeat his opponent in a battle near the Roman colony of Italica. His reasons for doing so are unclear, given Sertorius' orders not to engage Metellus: it is possible he was provoked by Metellus' "luxurious mode of life" or, less probably, Metellus was attempting to pursue Sertorius and Hirtuleius felt compelled, or followed orders, to stop him.

At dawn Hirtuleius mustered his army and marched on Metellus's encampment trying to provoke his opponent into battle. Metellus, however, kept his troops in his camp behind their entrenchments until noon. It was extremely hot and Hirtuleius's troops were soon sweltering out in the open while Metellus's legionaries remained relatively fresh. Since his enemy remained drawn up in front of his camp for hours, Metellus had plenty of time to study their dispositions and make his own plans accordingly. He observed that Hirtuleius had posted his strongest units in the centre of his battle line and decided to use this to his advantage. When the battle finally commenced Metellus held back his own centre and concentrated on winning on the flanks. After routing their opponents his wings enveloped Hirtuleius centre. Hirtuleius lost 20,000 men and fled north to join his commander Sertorius who was squaring off against Pompey in the Battle of Sucro. Metellus followed Hirtuleius wanting to make the most of his victory by trapping Sertorius between Pompey and himself.

==== The Battle of Saguntum ====
Several weeks later Hirtuleius faced Metellus again, commanding one of Sertorius's wings at the Battle of Saguntum. During the battle Hirtuleius's wing was pushed back by Metellus's legions, he died in the fighting. When Sertorius learned of Hirtuleius' death from a native, he stabbed the native with a dagger so as to keep the news from breaking the spirit of his men.

== See also ==
- Hirtuleia gens
- Battle of Italica
- Battle of Saguntum (75 BC)

== Bibliography ==
- Howard H. Scullard, From the Gracchi to Nero: A History of Rome from 133 B.C. to A.D. 68, Psychology Press (1982).
- Philip O. Spann, Quintus Sertorius and the Legacy of Sulla, University of Arkansas Press (1987).
- Philip Matyszak, Sertorius and the Struggle for Spain, Pen & Sword Books Ltd (2013).
