= Sertorian War =

Civil war in Roman republican Spain

- Part of the Crisis of the Roman Republic
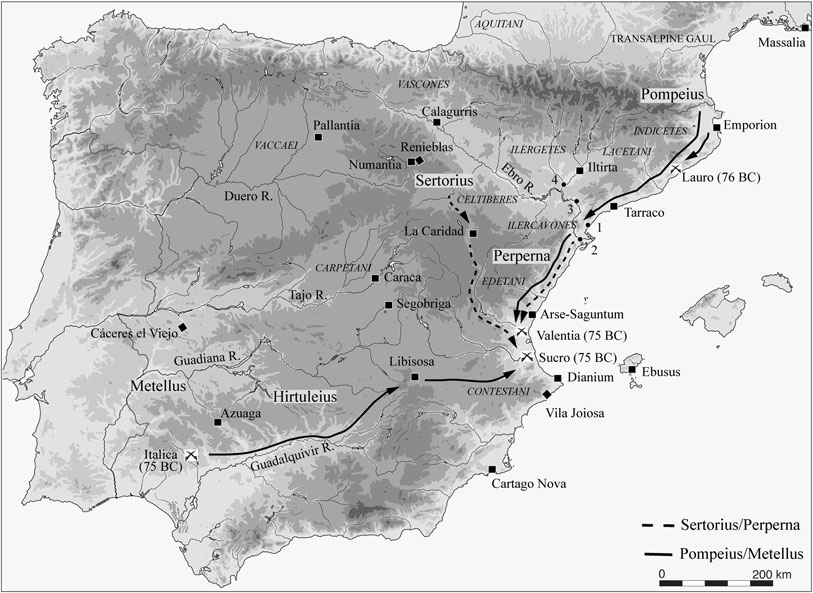
- Troop movements and battles of the Sertorian War between 76–75 BC
| Date | 80–72 BC |
| Location | Hispania (Iberian Peninsula) |
| Result | Sullan victory |

Belligerents
| Sertorians; Iberian peoples; Celtiberians; Cilician Pirates; Mauretania | Sullan senate |

Commanders and leaders
| Quintus Sertorius X; Lucius Hirtuleius †; M. Perperna Veiento (executed); Gaius Herennius †; Gaius Octavius Graecinus; Gaius Tarquitius Priscus; Lucius Insteius; Gaius Insteius; Marcus Marius | Metellus Pius; Pompey; Gaius Memmius †; Lucius Afranius; Decimus Laelius †; Lucius Fufidius; Gaius Aurelius Cotta; M. Domitius Calvinus †; Lucius Thorius Balbus †; Quintus Calidius; Lucius Manlius; Lucius Cornelius Balbus |

The Sertorian War was a civil war in the Roman Republic fought from 80 to 72 BC between two Roman factions, one led by Quintus Sertorius and another led by the senate as constituted in the aftermath of Sulla's civil war. The war was fought on the Iberian Peninsula (called Hispania by the Romans) and was one of the Roman civil wars of the first century BC. The Sertorians comprised many Roman exiles from the Sullan proscriptions led by Sertorius, who fashioned himself proconsul, and native Celts, Aquitanians, and Iberians.

The war takes its name from Quintus Sertorius, the leader of the opposition. It was notable for Sertorius' successful use of guerrilla warfare. Sertorius was sent by the Marian regime as proconsul to Hispania in 83 BC, but was ejected by a Sullan army in 81 BC. He returned in 80 BC, landing in Hispania Ulterior, and campaigned with success against the Sullan governors, depicting himself as the legitimate Roman governor of Hispania while winning over the native tribes.

Sertorius consolidated control over both Hispanian provinces (Ulterior and Citerior) between 80–77 BC through pitched battles and guerrilla warfare, along with the aid of his legate Lucius Hirtuleius. Metellus Pius, sent against Sertorius in 80 BC, failed to dislodge him after several years of campaigning, as Sertorius repeatedly defeated him. The Roman Senate sent Pompey to help Metellus in late 77 BC, but in 76 BC Pompey was defeated by Sertorius at the Battle of Lauron, and the Sullan generals made no progress in the year.

75 BC featured four large battles that deteriorated the Sertorian cause. Marcus Perperna Veiento and Gaius Herennius were defeated by Pompey at the Battle of Valentia, while Metellus defeated Hirtuleius at the Battle of Italica. Sertorius engaged Pompey at the indecisive Battle of Sucro, and then the combined armies of Pompey and Metellus at the indecisive Battle of Saguntum.

The Sertorian armies were greatly diminished following these battles. The Sullan generals were able to call on reinforcements from Rome, and from 74 BC onward conducted a war of attrition that the Sertorians were unable to stop. After years of fighting, discontent in the Sertorian coalition grew and culminated in the assassination of Sertorius by Perperna in 73 or 72 BC. The war ended soon after when Perperna was promptly defeated by Pompey in the Battle of Osca.

== Origins ==
During Sulla's civil war, Quintus Sertorius fought for the Marian-Cinnan faction against Sulla. In 83 BC, Sertorius, after falling out with his faction's leadership, was sent to the Iberian Peninsula as its governor. Unfortunately for Sertorius, his faction lost the war in Italy, and Sulla dispatched an army which drove him from Iberia. After some wandering, Sertorius ended up in Tingis in North Africa. There, he helped the locals depose Ascalis, a pro-Sullan tyrant. In Tingis he was met by an embassy of discontented Lusitanians, a fierce Celtic people, who implored him to lead them against the Sullan government which was extorting them back home. The Lusitanians chose Sertorius because of the mild policy he had pursued while governor in 82 BC, as compared to harsher earlier governors.

The Lusitani had a long history of resistance to Rome. Some historians have concluded that the Lusitani were seeking independence, and by taking over the leadership of the movement, Sertorius was opposing Rome itself. Philip Spann considers this unlikely, because were Sertorius to accept such a treasonable offer, it would be to destroy any hope of his return to Rome. More likely, the offer grew out of an acceptance by the Lusitani that they would not be able to defeat Rome and that their best hope was to assist the establishment in Rome of a regime sympathetic to them. Spann suggests that a major reason for Sertorius' acceptance was that it was becoming clearer that there would be no amnesty for him and his followers nor reconciliation with the regime set up by Sulla.

In 80 BC, Sertorius, after defeating off Mellaria a small naval force under Aurelius Cotta, landed in the Iberian Peninsula at Baelo, near the Pillars of Hercules (Gibraltar). Plutarch's account implies that Sertorius first went to Lusitania, where he organized the tribes and only then returned to the Baetis valley to defeat a Roman force under Lucius Fufidius (probably the governor of Hispania Ulterior). Spann suggests that a more probable sequence is that the battle of the Baetis River occurred during Sertorius' initial march to Lusitania.

== Events of 80–77 BC ==
Sertorius‘ victory at the Baetis brought the majority of Hispania Ulterior back under his control. While he consolidated his power in the south-west (Ulterior) he sent his trusted lieutenant, Lucius Hirtuleius, to Hispania Citerior to take care of its governor, one Cotta, and the remaining Sullan forces on the Iberian Peninsula. Concerned at the growing threat, the authorities in Rome upgraded Hispania Ulterior from a propraetorian to a proconsular province, and appointed Quintus Caecilius Metellus Pius, Sulla's consular partner of 80 BC, as its governor. In 79 BC, with Metellus on his way, Marcus Domitius Calvinus (who had taken over Hispania Citerior from Cotta) crossed over into Hispania Ulterior, he found his passage blocked by the army of Hirtuleius who had fortified Consabura.

Hirtuleius, a lieutenant of Quintus Sertorius, was taking a handful of cohorts up a narrow road between two steep and impassable mountains. On being told that a substantial enemy force was approaching he dug a ditch between the mountains, and set a wooden rampart behind that. He then set fire to the rampart and made his escape with the enemy cut off [on the other side of the flames].

Hirtuleius used guerrilla warfare to wear down Domitius Calvinus's army while he lured him inland. Eventually a battle was fought at the Anas River; where Domitius was defeated; he either died in battle or was killed by his own troops who defected to the rebels.

Metellus, unaware of the disaster, had already sent one of his legates, Lucius Thorius Balbus, to provide assistance to Domitius, but he too was defeated, this time by Sertorius himself. Domitius Calvinus's replacement as governor was Quintus Calidius. Metellus entered Spain in late 80 or early 79 BC, basing himself at Metellinum (modern Medellin), made several thrusts into the interior, but was thwarted by Sertorius who used guerrilla tactics.

He [Metellus] was accustomed to regular warfare with heavy infantry. He liked to command a solid, ponderous bloc of infantry. This formation was superbly trained to push back and vanquish the enemy in combat at close quarters. For constantly chasing men who floated like the wind over mountains he had to climb, for enduring – as their enemy did – constant hunger without either tent or campfire, his army was useless. The light armour and consequent agility of his Iberian warriors meant Sertorius was constantly shifting the focus and changing the situation, until Metellus was at his wits' end. Metellus was no longer young, and after the many heroic contests of his youth he was now inclined to ease and luxury, while Sertorius was full of mature vigour. ... When Sertorius challenged Metellus to single combat, Metellus' men cheered and urged him to fight it out, general on general, and they mocked him when he declined.

Lacking strong-points in central Hispania, Metellus set about creating them, he also started to methodically secure the cities and tribes of Hispania [this was the same strategy his father had used in the Jugurthine War when he had to fight king Jugurtha of Numidia who also used guerrilla tactics – Metellus had served on his father's staff back then]. Some of these forts are known today – Metellinum (Medellin), Castra Caecilia (Cáceres), Viccus Caecilius and Caecilina. This strategy might have worked on an inferior opponent, but Sertorius kept up a relentless campaign of hit-and-run attacks and ambuscades slowly wearing down Metellus who was soon forced to call for help.

Lucius Manlius, the governor of Gallia Transalpina, tried to come to Metellus's aid, he marched with three legions and 1,500 cavalry across the Pyrenees. He fought a battle with the forces of Lucius Hirtuleius near Ilerda where he was defeated and driven back into the city. After this setback, Manlius decided to retreat to his province. Hirtuleius tried to put Manlius under siege in Ilerda, but the governor of Gaul was able to escape. When he returned to Gaul where he was attacked by the Aquitani.

In 78 BC Metellus tried to take Langobriga (probably Laccobriga near Lisbon), a town allied to Sertorius. Metellus intended it to be an object lesson; he wanted the Celtic towns to know Sertorius could not protect them. Forewarned Sertorius supplied and fortified the city and stripped the countryside around Langobriga of anything useful. Through these countermeasures Sertorius not only forced Metellus into besieging the city but also caused him to rapidly run out of supplies. Metellus detached a legion to go scouting for provisions. Upon their return they were ambushed by Sertorius who routed them and forced them to abandon their supplies. Metellus was left with nothing to feed his army; he abandoned the siege and marched back to the coast. Back in Rome, Sulla died (78 BC) of natural causes leaving his faction without a strong leader.

In 77 BC Metellus adopted a more cautious strategy, only holding on to the line of the Baetis river while he awaited the events in Rome where a new revolt loomed. Sertorius left Metellus to his devices and concentrated on subduing those tribes in the interior that had not yet yielded to his authority.

== Events of 76–74 BC ==
The ongoing Sertorian threat forced the government in Rome into taking drastic measures; they agreed that the new governor of Hispania Citerior should get a proconsular command and that he should be sent out with a sizeable army to support Metellus's struggle against Sertorius and his rebels. In 76 BC the Senate accepted a proposal by Lucius Marcius Philippus to send his son-in-law Gnaeus Pompeius Magnus (Pompey), who had never been a magistrate, on behalf of the consuls (both of whom had refused the command themselves). Pompey recruited an army of 30,000 infantry and 1,000 cavalry, its size evidence of the seriousness of the threat presented by Sertorius, and marched to Hispania.

In the same year (76 BC) Sertorius was joined by Marcus Perperna, who brought the remnant of the army of rebellious consul Marcus Aemilius Lepidus from Sardinia. However, Perperna had only reluctantly agreed to put himself under Sertorius's command; he had sailed his army to Liguria and was raising troops from among the Ligurians and Gauls there. When his men heard that Pompey was marching north to deal with them, they demanded that Perperna take them to Hispania and join up with Sertorius. Perperna brought a substantial force of fifty-three cohorts (almost five-and-a-half legions) with him to Spain. Thus reinforced Sertorius decided to take on the eastern cities who supported the Sullan faction. His first target was the city of Lauron between Valentia and Saguntum. Meanwhile, Pompey had crossed the Pyrenees and was marching his army toward Sertorius. He intended to finish the rebellion in one stroke by trying to force Sertorius into a pitched battle and defeating him. Pompey also sent a fleet under his brother-in-law, Gaius Memmius, accompanied by the Spaniard Balbus, to try and take New Carthage, secure it as a base, and from there move up the coast. Memmius was immediately blockaded in the city, probably by Sertorius's pirate allies, and was unable to play his part in the campaign.

=== The Battle of Lauron ===
Pompey had a veteran army (recruited from among his own and Sulla's veterans) of 30,000 infantry and 1,000 cavalry at his back and must have been very confident for he immediately took the offensive. Upon entering Hispania he started clearing the coastal strip from the Pyrenees to New Carthage in order to link up with Metellus who was in Hispania Ulterior. Initially successful, he suffered a major setback when he faced Sertorius at the city of Lauron. Sertorius arrived at Lauron first, and began to lay siege to the city. Pompey was very confident of victory; when he arrived he built his camp close to that of Sertorius to force Sertorius into battle. Sertorius decided to teach Pompey a lesson.

Pompey, was delighted with the way things had turned out, for he now positioned his army so that Sertorius was, as he believed, caught between the city and the army. So Pompey sent a messenger to the people of Lauron. He invited them to celebrate, and take their seats along the city wall to see how Sertorius enjoyed being besieged. Sertorius was told of this, and found it highly amusing. Sulla's pupil (as he jokingly liked to refer to Pompey) was due another lesson – this time from Sertorius himself.

Sertorius responded by sending out his light troops and cavalry to harass Pompey's foragers. He ordered his men to concentrate on the forage parties in the nearby areas but to leave the Pompeians in the more distant tracts alone. Eventually, tired of the continual raids, the Pompeians moved their foraging operations to the more remote areas. This was what Sertorius had been waiting for; During the night he ordered ten cohorts of heavily armed troops and ten cohorts of light troops under the command of Octavius Gracinus and two thousand cavalry under Tarquitius Priscus to move out of his camp and ambush the foragers.

The Battle of Lauron was a brilliant tactical victory for the Sertorians and proved the war was far from over. Unfortunately for Sertorius, Metellus fought his way past Perperna who was trying to keep him from interfering and came to Pompey's rescue. Unwilling to be caught between two enemies, Sertorius withdrew.

=== The battles of Valentia and Italica ===
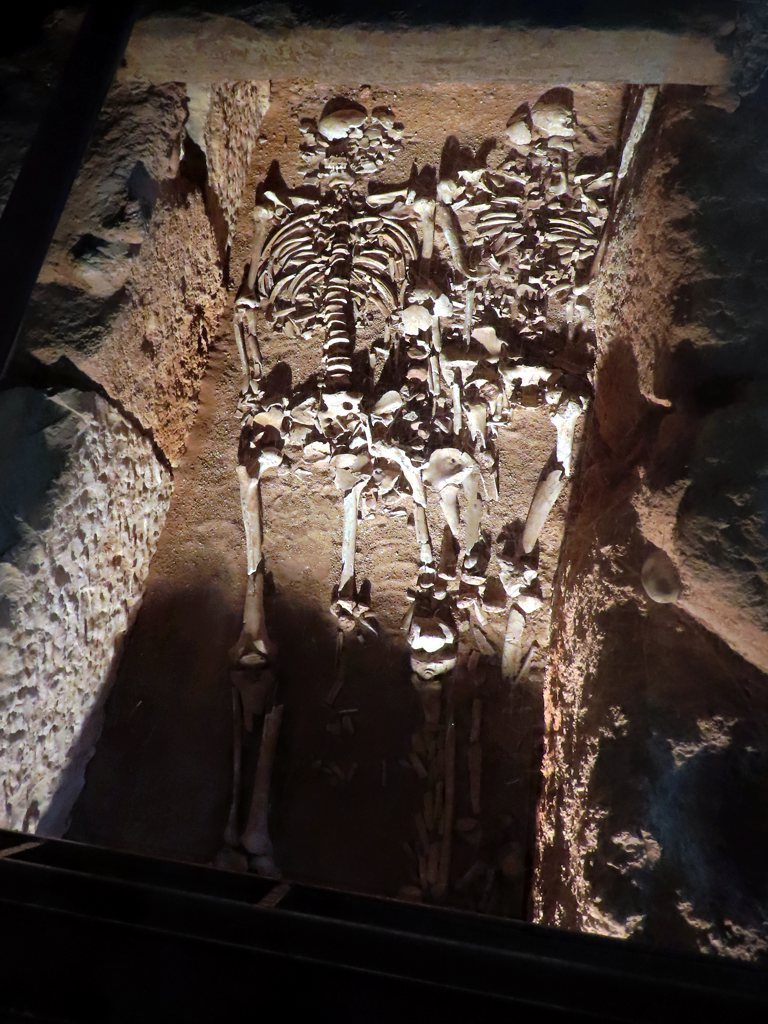
Skeletons of Roman rebel soldiers executed when Pompey sacked Valentia Edetanorum

At the start of the campaigning season of 75 BC Pompey defeated Sertorius's legates, Perperna and Gaius Herennius, in a battle near Valentia. Perperna and Herennius made the mistake of giving battle, apparently under the impression they could defeat the young general in a pitched battle. They fought in the narrow space which separated the river from the city walls, conditions which favoured the battle-hardened veterans of their opponent. Herennius himself was among the 10,000 casualties. Valentia was taken and sacked. Sertorius who was campaigning against Metellus had to rush east to recover the situation, leaving Hirtuleius in command in Hispania Ulterior.

Metellus promptly defeated Hirtuleius in a battle near the Roman colony of Italica. Hirtuleius mustered his army soon after dawn and marched on Metellus's encampment. Metellus also mustered his troops, but kept them behind his entrenchments until noon. It was extremely hot and Hirtuleius' troops were soon sweltering while Metellus' legionaries remained relatively fresh. Since his enemy remained drawn up in front of his camp for hours, Metellus had plenty of time to study their dispositions and make his own plans accordingly. He had observed that Hirtuleius had posted his strongest units in the centre of his battle line. When the battle finally commenced Metellus held back his own centre and concentrated on winning on the flanks. After defeating his opponent's flanks, he enveloped Hirtuleius' centre. Hirtuleius lost 20,000 men at Italica and, chastened, fled north to join his commander Sertorius who was squaring off against Pompey. Metellus followed, wanting to make the most of his victory by trapping Sertorius between Pompey and himself.

=== The battles of Sucro and Saguntum ===
Upon hearing of Hirtuleius's defeat and the loss of his army at Italica, Sertorius decided he had to defeat Pompey before Metellus arrived from the west. Pompey, for whatever reason, decided to comply and both men drew up their armies for battle. They fought a pitched battle at the River Sucro; and although Sertorius defeated the left wing of Pompey's army (even forcing Pompey himself to flee the battlefield after his failed attempt to raise morale among his crumbling wing) his other wing was defeated by Pompey's legate Afranius, so the end result was a draw. When word came of Metellus's imminent arrival, Sertorius marched inland with Pompey and Metellus in pursuit. At a town called Saguntum (probably not the city of Saguntum but a town with a similar name – see the discussion about its location in the Battle of Saguntum main article) Sertorius' own forces, fed up with Sertorius' guerrilla tactics, forced Sertorius into battle. Although the battle ended inconclusively, Sertorius suffered severe losses and withdrew further inland.

=== Rebuilding the army ===
Sertorius marched to the fortress town of Clunia in Celtiberia drawing Metellus and Pompey with him. At Clunia, Sertorius resisted a siege tying up Pompey and Metellus while his agents were rebuilding his army elsewhere. When it was ready, Sertorius extricated his force from Clunia and joined up with the rest of his army.

=== The 74 BC campaigns ===
The war during the year 74 BC is poorly documented. During the winter Metellus, who was wintering in Gaul, received two legions in reinforcements When the campaigning season started he marched across the Pyrenees and joined Pompey. They concentrated their efforts on the lands of the Celtiberians and the Vaccaei. Overall, however, it seems that Sertorius' position was somewhat eroded. According to Frontinus Metellus even got lucky during that particular year.

Metellus wanted to keep his troops in order so he had announced he had intelligence of an enemy ambush. He ordered that no-one should break ranks and leave the standards. He only did this to keep his troops disciplined, yet he happened to meet with an actual ambush. His soldiers dealt with it calmly, since they were expecting it.

Pompey had less luck when he tried to take Palentia. He was besieging the city when Sertorius appeared. Pompey did not stay to fight, but retreated before Sertorius could engage. From that moment on Pompey operated more closely to Metellus, each remaining close enough to support the other should the need arise.

Perperna circumvented the Romans operating in the interior and marched to the Iberian west coast where he took the city of Portus Cale.

After rebuilding the walls of Palentia, Sertorius suddenly marched east into the Ebro valley. He surprised the Romans besieging the fortress town of Calgurris, killing some 3000 of them.

The Senate sent an admiral called Antonius with a fleet to wage a naval campaign against Sertorius' naval and coastal forces. Antonius tried to raise the siege of Emporion, but made little progress against the stalwart Sertorian besiegers. Eventually, Antonius was recalled as his fleet was needed elsewhere.

At the end of the campaigning season of 74 BC Pompey took his army into the Roman Province in southern Gaul where the local governor, Fronteius, had laid on stores for Pompey and his forces. Pompey used the winter to write urgent letters to his followers and the Senate in Rome. The letter to the Senate has been preserved in the works of Sallust.

From my early youth I have endured peril and privation whilst the armies under my command put to flight the most criminal of your enemies and made you safe. Yet, Fathers of the Senate, now that I am absent, you could do no more against me than you are now doing if I had spent my time fighting you, my fatherland and my father's gods. For now, despite my youth, you have left me exposed in the cruellest of wars. You have, to the best of your ability, condemned both me and a faithful army to that most wretched of deaths, that of starvation. Is this what the Roman people expected when they sent their sons to war? And after being wounded, and so often shedding their blood for their country, is this how they are rewarded? When I got tired of fruitlessly writing letters and sending envoys, I used up my personal resources, and even my credit, while in three years you have barely supplied me with enough to keep going for one. By the Immortal Gods! What do you think I am – the treasury, or someone capable of running an army with neither food nor pay? I'll admit that I started this war with more zeal than discretion. Forty days after you gave me the empty title of general I had raised an army. The enemy [i.e. Perperna] were already at the throat of Italy, and I drove them from the Alps into Hispania, in the process opening for you a route far superior to Hannibal's. ... Outnumbered and with inexperienced troops I held off the first onslaught of the conquering Sertorius. Thereafter I spent the winter not in making myself popular or in the towns but in camp among the most savage of enemies. Do I really have to recount the battles and campaigns, the towns destroyed or captured? The matter speaks for itself; the taking of the enemy camp at Sucro, the fight on the River Turia, Gaius Herennius, the enemy commander, wiped out along with his army; Valentia; you know all this well enough. So, grateful fathers, in return for all this – we get want and hunger. They are in the same condition, the enemy army and mine. Neither has any pay, and both can march into Italy to get it. Take note of this and please give my warning your full attention – you do not want me to take into my own hands the job of providing myself with what I need. Those parts of Hispania Citerior not held by the enemy are actually a costly burden for us because apart from the coastal towns both we and Sertorius have devastated it into total destitution. Gaul supplied cash and crops to Metellus last year – this year the crops failed and the province can barely support itself. So I'm out of options, money and credit. It is up to you. Either you save the situation or my army will come to Italy and bring the war with it. It's not what I want, but you have been warned.

Pompey's threat galvanised Rome's aristocrats, and since the State was lacking the funds, they started a fund-raising campaign. The Sertorian threat frightened Rome's elite and many decided to contribute from their private fortunes.

== Events of 73–71 BC ==
During 73 BC there was a growing division between the Roman and Native elements of the Sertorian coalition. Metellus had offered a reward of one hundred silver talents and twenty-thousand acres of land to any Roman who would betray Sertorius. Sertorius therefore exchanged his Roman bodyguard with Iberians, causing resentment among the Romans and Italians in the Sertorian camp who saw this as a sign that their commander did not trust them anymore. A group of Romans began to actively plot his downfall, viewing him as more and more erratic and paranoid. Plutarch tells how the Romans meted out harsh treatment to the Natives, blaming their actions on Sertorius' orders thus undermining his popularity, while Sertorius himself remained unaware. It is normally assumed that Perperna made his move to assassinate Sertorius in 72 BC. However there are strong arguments in favor of 73 BC.

Perperna proceeded to invite Sertorius to a feast to celebrate a supposed victory. While under most circumstances, any festivities to which Sertorius was invited were conducted with great propriety, this particular feast was vulgar, designed to offend the skillful general. Perperna wanted to goad Sertorius to leave and wander into the crowds, so it would be easier to kill him, as despite his age Sertorius was still a skilled warrior. Disgusted, Sertorius changed his posture on the couch, intent on ignoring them all. At this, Perperna gave the signal to his fellow conspirators, and they murdered the unsuspecting Sertorius on the spot.

Upon learning of the death of Sertorius, some of his Iberian allies sent ambassadors to Pompey or to Metellus and made peace, most simply went home. Perperna managed to retain control of some of the Roman renegades who had followed Sertorius, but he needed a quick victory to gain his people's trust. Unfortunately for Perperna and his men, Pompey had set a trap; he feigned a retreat and ambushed them. Frontinus reports:

Pompey put troops here and there, in places where they could attack from ambush. Then, pretending fear, he pulled back drawing the enemy after him. Then, when he had the enemy exposed to the ambuscade, he wheeled his army about. He attacked, slaughtering the enemy to his front and on both flanks.

Pompey lured Perperna's army into his ambush using 10 cohorts as bait. He allowed these to be attacked while scattered over a wide area, perhaps foraging, and as they fled they drew Perperna's army into the hidden lines of the main army. As these attacked from ambush, the 10 cohorts turned and attacked their pursuers from the front. The ensuing massacre was decisive.

Pompey's successful ambush proved Plutarch's disparaging comment "Perperna was as bad at command as he was at following orders". Perperna attempted to plead for his life, offering to give Pompey all of Sertorius' correspondence, which would document contacts with the highest levels of Roman government and society. Pompey indicated he would accept the papers, but when they had all been gathered together, he burned them, averting the possibility of another civil war. He executed Perperna and all of the men who had murdered Sertorius. After this final battle, which seems to have taken place near Sertorius's capital of Osca, the war was as good as over.

== Aftermath ==
In the view of Scullard, Pompey's treatment of Hispania was humane, relative to the normal Roman treatment for traitors and rebels. Citizenship was given to many supporters and a group of fanatical opponents were resettled to Lugdunum Convenarum in southern Gaul.

== Timeline ==
- 80 BC Sertorius and a small army land at Baelo (near the Pillars of Hercules)
- 80 BC At the Baetis estuary Sertorius defeats the forces of Fufidius (probably the Roman governor of Hispania Ulterior)
- 80 BC Hirtuleius (Sertorius's lieutenant) defeats Domitius Calvinus (governor of Hispania Citerior) on the banks of the Anas River
- 80/79 Sertorius defeats Lucius Thorius Balbus (a lieutenant of the consul Metellus Pius)
- 79 BC Metellus marches into Hispania, Sertorius start wearing him down by guerrilla warfare
- 79/78 Hirtuleius defeats Lucius Manlius, the governor of Gallia Transalpina, and forces him back into Gaul
- 78 BC Metellus tries to take Langobriga, Sertorius thwarts his efforts
- 77 BC Sertorius consolidates his power, he gains control of most of the Iberia Peninsula
- 77 BC The Senate sends Gnaeus Pompey Magnus with a large army to reinforce Metellus
- 76 BC Pompey is outgeneraled and defeated at the Battle of Lauron (two-thirds of his army survive and he remains a force to be reckoned with)
- 76 BC Gaius Memmius (Pompey's quaestor) captures New Carthage, but is blockaded by Sertorius's allies
- 75 BC Pompey defeats Herennius and Perperna at the Battle Valentia
- 75 BC Metellus defeats Hirtuleius at the Battle of Italica
- 75 BC Pompey and Sertorius fight the indecisive Battle of Sucro, Sertorius retreats inland
- 75 BC Sertorius fights Metellus and Pompey at the Battle of Saguntum, Sertorius retreats further inland
- 75 BC Metellus and Pompey besiege Sertorius at Clunia, Sertorius breaks through their lines and escapes
- 74 BC Pompey and Metellus campaign against Sertorius's allies
- 74 BC Sertorius drives Pompey from Palentia
- 74 BC Perperna takes Cale on the Hispanic west coast
- 74 BC Sertorius rebuilds the walls of Palentia
- 74 BC Sertorius marches into the Ebro valley and surprises the Romans besieging Calgurris (killing 3000 of the besiegers)
- 74 BC Antonius, a Roman admiral, tries to break the Sertorian siege of Emporion, he failed and is recalled
- 74 BC Pompey writes his famous letter to the Senate threatening to march back to Rome unless the Senate sends funds and reinforcements
- 73 BC Metellus offers a reward to anyone who will kill Sertorius
- 73 BC There is a growing division in the Sertorian camp
- 73 BC Perperna and his fellow conspirators assassinate Sertorius during a banquet
- 72 BC Pompey ambushes Perperna's army and defeats the last remnants of the Sertorians

== Modern Sources ==
- Philip Matyszak, Sertorius and the struggle for Spain, Pen & Sword Military, Barnsley (2013) ISBN 978-1-84884-787-3
- Philip Spann, Quintus Sertorius and the Legacy of Sulla, University of Arkansas Press (1987) ISBN 978-0-938626-64-0
