= Battle of Lauron =

Battle of the Sertorian War (76 BCE)

Coordinates: 39°09′08″N 0°26′33″W

- Part of the Sertorian War
Date	76 BC
Location	Near Sucro, likely Alzira (36 kilometers from Valentia)
Result	Sertorian victory

Belligerents
Sertorian rebels	Roman Senate

Commanders and leaders
Quintus Sertorius; Octavius Graecinus; Gaius Tarquitius Priscus	Pompey Magnus; Decimus Laelius †

Strength
c. 20,000–30,000 men engaged: 12,000 men • 10 cohorts of heavy infantry • 10 cohorts of light infantry • 2,000 cavalry	• 30,000 legionaries • 1,000 cavalry • unknown number of auxiliaries and allied troops engaged: 10,000+ men

Casualties and losses
Probably few	10,000 (Livy)
- Location within Spain

The Battle of Lauron (also known as the Battle of Lauro, not to be confused for the Battle of Lauro of 45 BC) was fought in 76 BC by a rebel force under the command of the renegade Roman general Quintus Sertorius and an army of Roman Republic under the command of the Roman general Gnaeus Pompeius Magnus (better known as Pompey). The battle was part of the Sertorian War and ended in victory for Sertorius and his rebels. The battle was recorded in detail by Frontinus in his Stratagems and by Plutarch in his Lives of Sertorius and Pompey.

== Background ==
In 88 BC Lucius Cornelius Sulla marched his legions on Rome, starting a period of civil wars. Quintus Sertorius, a client of Gaius Marius, joined his patron's faction and took up the sword against the Sullan faction (mainly optimates). After the death of Lucius Cornelius Cinna and Gaius Marius, Sertorius lost faith with his faction's leadership. In 82 BC, during the war against Sulla, he left Italy for his assigned province in Hispania. Unfortunately his faction, the Marians, lost the war in Italy right after his departure and in 81 BC Sulla sent Gaius Annius Luscus with several legions to take the Iberian provinces from Sertorius. After a brief resistance Sertorius and his men are expelled from Hispania. They ended up in Mauretania in north-western Africa where they conquered the city of Tingis. Here the Lusitanians, a fierce Iberian tribe who were about to be invaded by a Sullan governor, approached him. They requested Sertorius to become their war leader in the fight against the Sullans. Sertorius accepted the request and so well into 80 BC Sertorius landed at the little fishing town of Baelo near the Pillars of Hercules (Gibraltar) and returned to Hispania. Soon after his landing he fought and defeated the Sullan general Lucius Fufidius (the aforementioned Sullan governor) at the Baetis river. After the Baetis victory he defeated several Sullan armies and drove his opponents from Hispania.

Threatened by Sertorius' success the Senate in Rome upgraded Hispania Ulterior to a proconsular province and sent the proconsul Quintus Caecilius Metellus Pius with a large army to fight him. Sertorius used guerrilla tactics so effectively he wore down Metellus to the point of exhaustion while Sertorius' legate Lucius Hirtuleius defeated the governor of Hispania Citerior Marcus Domitius Calvinus. In 76 BC the government in Rome decided to send Pompey and an even larger army to help Metellus. In the same year Sertorius is joined by Marcus Perpenna, who brought him the remnants of the army of Marcus Aemilius Lepidus the rebel consul of 78 BC. Thus reinforced Sertorius decided to try and take the Iberian east coast (because the cities there supported his enemies). His first target was the city of Lauron.

== Prelude ==
Lauron was strategically located between Pompey's legions and those of his colleague Metellus. Sertorius wanted to prevent Pompey from linking up with Metellus and also punish Lauron for siding with his opponents. Pompey wanted to finish off Sertorius quickly and take credit for finishing the war in Hispania so both men marched for Lauron. Sertorius arrived first, and began to lay siege to the city. Pompey had a veteran army (recruited from among Sulla's veterans) of 30,000 infantry and 1,000 cavalry and was very confident of victory. When he arrived he built his camp close to that of Sertorius to force Sertorius into battle.

Pompey, was delighted with the way things had turned out, for he now positioned his army so that Sertorius was, as he believed, caught between the city and the army. So Pompey sent a messenger to the people of Lauron. He invited them to celebrate, and take their seats along the city wall to see how Sertorius enjoyed being besieged. Sertorius was told of this, and found it highly amusing. Sulla's pupil (as he jokingly liked to refer to Pompey) was due another lesson – this time from Sertorius himself.

Sertorius responded by sending out his light troops and cavalry to harass Pompey's foragers. He ordered his men to concentrate on the forage parties in the nearby areas but to leave the Pompeians in the more distant tracts. Eventually, tired of the continual raids, the Pompeians moved their foraging operations to the more remote areas. This was what Sertorius had been waiting for. During the night he ordered ten cohorts of heavily armed troops and ten cohorts of light troops under the command of Octavius Gracinus, along with Tarquitius Priscus and two thousand cavalry to move out of his camp and lay an ambush against the foragers.

== Battle ==
Pompey's foragers had also been out overnight, and were well loaded with supplies. When they were heading back to camp they were suddenly attacked by the lightly armed Iberians. The Pompeians tried to form battle lines but before they could do so, the Sertorian heavy infantry charged them from the woods. The charge broke the Roman battle line and routed the entire foraging party, which ran for the safety of Pompey's camp. At this point the Sertorian cavalry was unleashed and started riding down the fleeing Pompeians, turning the rout into a massacre. Furthermore a squadron of 250 cavalry had set out for Pompey's camp the moment the opening attack started and were now working their way back, killing every Pompeian they encountered.

When Pompey became aware of his foragers' predicament, he sent one of his legates, Decimus Laelius, with his legion to cover his men's retreat. The advancing legion encountered the Sertorian cavalry and forced them back to the right flank where they fell out of sight. They then encountered the Sertorian infantry. While they were forming up to engage the infantry, they were hit in the rear by the Sertorian cavalry, who had circled around. As the legion recoiled from the shock of this unexpected attack they were attacked from the front by the Sertorian infantry. Like the foragers before them, they broke and fled, and the massacre continued.

By that time Pompey was leading out his entire army and forming them up to come to his men's rescue. As he was preparing to march, Sertorius led out his remaining troops and drew up for battle. Pompey now had a dilemma on his hands. If he marched to rescue his men, Sertorius could hit his rear or flank, with disastrous results. If, on the other hand, he would advance on Sertorius then his retreating force would probably be destroyed and he still would have to fight an uphill battle, this seriously increased the odds of Pompey's army suffering a crippling defeat.

Pompey's only logical course of action was to stay put and he did. He was forced to become a bystander while his men were cut down before his eyes. The Pompeian army lost ten thousand men. With morale very low, Pompey's army was confined to camp while Sertorius burned down Lauron. It was only the arrival of Metellus and his army who prevented Sertorius from finishing off Pompey. Not willing to be caught between two Republican armies, Sertorius had to withdraw.

== Aftermath ==
The battle was spectacular victory but not a decisive one, for Pompey and his army remained a force to be reckoned with and Sertorius had to withdraw when Metellus arrived on the scene. The war in Hispania would rage on for several more years and only ended when a number of his own men plotted against Sertorius and assassinated him.

== Ancient sources ==
- Plutarch, Life of Pompey 18.3.
- Plutarch, Life of Sertorius 18.
- Frontinus, Stratagems 2.5.31.

== Modern sources ==
- John Leach, Pompey the Great p 44 and pp 226-227.
- Philip Matyszak, Sertorius and the Struggle for Spain pp 96-101.
- Philip Spann, Quintus Sertorius and the Legacy of Sulla.
- Sampson, Gareth C. (2013). The Collapse of Rome: Marius, Sulla and the First Civil War. Barnsley: Pen & Sword Military. ISBN 978-1-84884-326-4.
