= Marcus Perperna Veiento =

Roman general

Marcus Perperna (or Perpenna) Veiento (also, incorrectly, Vento; died 72 BC) was a Roman aristocrat, statesman and general. He fought in Sulla's civil war, Lepidus' failed rebellion of 77 BC and from 76 to 72 BC in the Sertorian War. He conspired against and assassinated Quintus Sertorius, and was defeated and executed by Pompey the Great.

== Name ==
The names Perperna and Perpenna are attested for this nomen gentilicium (of Etruscan origin), but Perperna is more frequent and the form used in the most reliable inscriptions, followed by the prosopographical scholarship (e.g. Broughton).

== Early life and career ==
Not much is known about Perperna before the civil wars against Sulla. Perperna was a member of the Cinna-Marius faction during their war against the Sullan faction. He governed the island of Sicily as propraetor during the second civil war. After Sulla defeated the populares faction in Italy he sent his new stepson-in-law Pompey (Pompey had married Aemilia, Sulla's stepdaughter) to recover Sicily and Africa. Perperna abandoned the island upon hearing of the size and nature of the force sent against him. After Sulla became Dictator of Rome, Perperna was proscripted and went into exile. After Sulla's death he was recalled by Marcus Aemilius Lepidus, the consul of 78 BC, whom he joined in rebellion against the Sullan faction. Lepidus marched his army on Rome but was defeated by Quintus Lutatius Catulus in a brisk military action just outside of the city while Lepidus' legate Marcus Junius Brutus was defeated by Pompey at Mutina. Perperna and Lepidus pulled their forces back through Etruria to the island of Sardinia. Lepidus died while on Sardinia - by some accounts of a broken heart - brought on not by his failed bit for power but by the accidental discovery that his wife had been unfaithful to him. In 76 BC Perperna took their army - a substantial affair of several legions - to Liguria and continued the rebellion. After he found out Pompey and a very large army had been sent to defeat him (on route to the Iberian Peninsula and the war against Sertorius) he decided to take his forces to Hispania.

== Sertorian War ==
Perperna's soldiers were dissatisfied with his leadership, and when they learned that Pompey was crossing the Pyrenees, they demanded that Perperna take them to Sertorius, or they would abandon him to Pompey's mercies while they took themselves to Sertorius. Perperna yielded to the demands of the legions, and handed them over to Sertorius. This was not done with good will, and Perperna, conscious of his noble bloodline and wealth, viewed the entire affair as a humiliation.

When they heard that Pompey was crossing the Pyrenees, the soldiers took up their weapons and lifted their standards [i.e. made ready to march]. They raised a clamour, demanding that Perpenna take them to Sertorius. If he would not do that, the men threatened, then they would leave him to his own devices and put themselves under the command of a man who could protect himself and his subordinates. So Perpenna gave in, and led his army to join Sertorius.

Sertorius welcomed Perperna and his troops (a sizeable force of 53 cohorts) and put them to good use. He sent Perperna with 20,000 infantry and 1,500 cavalry to join Gaius Herennius (one of Sertorius' legates) in the territory of the Ilercavones, with instructions to guard the crossing of the lower Ebro and try and lure Pompey into an ambush. Pompey managed to cross the Ebro unhindered and marched to the plain of Valentia where he came to grips with Sertorius himself (see: Battle of Lauron).

At the beginning of the campaigning season of 75 BC Perperna, Herennius and their army were defeated by Pompey in a bloody battle near Valentia. Herennius was among the 10,000 casualties and the city of Valentia was taken and sacked. Perperna gathered what was left of his army and retreated westward towards Sertorius who was campaigning in Hispania Ulterior.

After the Valentia disaster Sertorius himself returned to the eastern theatre (he had been in the west of the Iberian Peninsula campaigning against Metellus) to take command of the fight against Pompey. Perperna was given command of a substantial force to block Metellus from coming to Pompey's aid. Sertorius tried to take out Pompey at the Battle of Sucro while Perperna tried to stop Metellus, both failed.

At the battle of Saguntum Perperna was in command of one of the wings of Sertorius' army. He fought Pompey then had to switch places with his commander and took on Metellus. During the battle, the biggest of the war, Perperna lost 6,000 men. After the battle Sertorius and Perperna withdrew inland and reverted to guerilla warfare.

In 74 BC, while Sertorius focused his attention on defending his allies in celtiberia, Perperna circumvented the Romans operating in the interior and marched to the Iberian westcoast where he took the city of Portus Cale.

The war was not going well and the Roman nobles and senators that made up the higher classes of his domain became discontented with Sertorius. They grew jealous of Sertorius' power, and Perperna, aspiring to take Sertorius' place, encouraged that jealousy for his own ends. They took to damaging Sertorius by oppressing the local Celtic tribes in his name. This stirred discontent and revolt in the tribes, which resulted in a cycle of oppression and revolt, with Sertorius none the wiser as to who was creating such mischief.

Perperna then proceeded to invite Sertorius to a feast to celebrate a supposed victory. While under most circumstances, any festivities to which Sertorius was invited were conducted with great propriety, this particular feast was vulgar, designed to offend the skillful general. Disgusted, Sertorius changed his posture on the couch, intent on ignoring them all. At this, Perperna gave the signal to his fellow conspirators, and they murdered the unsuspecting Sertorius on the spot.

Upon learning of the death of Sertorius, some of his Iberian allies sent ambassadors to Pompey or to Metellus and made peace, most simply went home. Now that Sertorius was dead, his virtues were remembered, and his recent atrocities forgotten.

People are generally less angry with those who died, and when they no longer see him right in front of them they tend to dwell tenderly on his virtues. So it was with Sertorius. Anger against him suddenly turned to affection and the soldiers clamorously rose up in protest against Perperna.

When Sertorius's will was read his people found out he had named Perperna his chief beneficiary. Perperna had already dishonoured himself in the eyes of many by slaying his commander, the man who had given him sanctuary, and now it was revealed he had killed his main benefactor as well.

== Death ==
Perperna managed to retain control of some of the Roman renegades who had followed Sertorius, but he needed a quick victory to gain his people's trust. Unfortunately for Perperna and his men, Pompey had set a trap: he feigned a retreat and ambushed them.

Pompey put troops here and there, in places where they could attack from ambush. Then, pretending fear, he pulled back drawing the enemy after him. Then, when he had the enemy exposed to the ambuscade, he wheeled his army about. He attacked, slaughtering the enemy to his front and on both flanks

Pompey lured Perperna's army into his ambush using 10 cohorts as bait. He allowed these to be attacked while scattered over a wide area, perhaps foraging, and as they fled they drew Perperna's army into the hidden lines of the main army. As these attacked from ambush the 10 cohorts turned and attacked their pursuers from the front. The ensuing massacre was decisive.

Pompey's successful ambush proved Plutarch's disparaging comment 'Perperna was as bad at command as he was at following orders'. Perperna attempted to plead for his life, offering to give Pompey all of Sertorius' correspondence, which would document contacts with the highest levels of Roman government and society. Pompey indicated he would accept the papers, and when they had all been gathered together, he burned them, averting the possibility of another civil war. He then executed Perperna and all of the men who had murdered Sertorius.

== Ancient Sources ==
- Plutarch, Parallel Lives, Life of Sertorius.
- Plutarch, Parallel Lives, Life of Pompey.
- Velleius Paterculus, Roman History in Two Volumes, chapter 30.

== Modern Sources ==
- Philip Matyszak, Sertorius and the Struggle for Spain, 2013.
- John Leach, Pompey the Great, 1978 (chapter 2).
