= Marcus Domitius Calvinus (praetor 80 BC) =

Roman politician and military commander

Marcus Domitius Calvinus (or possibly Lucius Domitius Calvinus) (Note: Domitius’ praenomen is given as Marcus in Livy and Lucius in Eutropius, while the cognomen Calvinus is Broughton’s correction of Plutarch’s text – see Broughton, pg. 85) (died 79 BC) was an ancient Roman politician and military commander who was killed during the early stages of the Sertorian War.

== Career ==
Domitius Calvinus was a member of the plebeian gens Domitia, who was elected praetor, serving in the office around the year 80 BC. (Note: The dates of his praetorship and subsequent career are uncertain. It is possible that Domitius Calvinus was praetor in 81 BC, with the date of his propraetorship and death dated to 80 BC – see Broughton, The Magistrates of the Roman Republic, Vol III (1986), pg. 84)

For the following year (79 BC) he was assigned the propraetorian province of Hispania Citerior. His tenure coincided with the outbreak of the Sertorian War. Quintus Sertorius, an opponent of the dictator Lucius Cornelius Sulla, had landed in Hispania Ulterior, and defeated its propraetor, Lucius Fufidius. Sertorius then took control of Hispania Ulterior while his legate and quaestor Lucius Hirtuleius marched on Domitius Calvinus in Hispania Citerior. In the meantime, the Senate decided that a more experienced commander was required. Therefore, they turned Hispania Ulterior into a proconsular province and sent the proconsul Metellus Pius as its new governor, and also gave him the command of the war against Sertorius.

It was around this time, with Metellus Pius on his way, that Domitius Calvinus crossed over into Hispania Ulterior, but found his passage blocked by the army of Hirtuleius who had fortified Consabura. Hirtuleius wore down Domitius Calvinus’s army by guerrilla warfare.

Hirtuleius, a lieutenant of Quintus Sertorius, was taking a handful of cohorts up a narrow road between two steep and impassable mountains. On being told that a substantial enemy force was approaching he dug a ditch between the mountains, and set a wooden rampart behind that. He then set fire to the rampart and made his escape with the enemy cut off [on the other side of the flames].

Eventually a battle was fought at the Anas river; here, the two forces engaged each other, with the end result that Domitius’ army was defeated. Domitius Calvinus either died in battle or was killed by his own troops as a peace-offering by his own troops who defected to the rebels.

Metellus Pius, unaware of the disaster, had already sent a legate named Lucius Thorius Balbus to provide assistance to Domitius Calvinus, but he too was defeated, this time by Sertorius. Calvinus’ replacement as governor was Quintus Calidius.

== Sources ==
- Brennan, T. Corey, The Praetorship in the Roman Republic, Volume 2 (2000)
- Broughton, T. Robert S., The Magistrates of the Roman Republic, Vol II (1951)
- Smith, William, Dictionary of Greek and Roman Biography and Mythology, Vol I (1867).
