= Marcus Aemilius Lepidus (consul 78 BC) =

Roman politician and rebel leader

- Born: c. 121 BC
- Died: 77 BC; Sardinia, Roman Republic
- Office: Aedile (before 82 BC); Praetor (81 BC); Propraetor (Sicily) (80 BC); Consul (78 BC)
- Children: M Aemilius Lepidus (triumvir); L Aemilius Paullus

Marcus Aemilius Lepidus (c. 121 – 77 BC) was a Roman statesman and general. After the death of Lucius Cornelius Sulla, he joined or instigated a rebellion against the Sullan regime, demanding a consecutive term as consul late in his year and, when refused, marching on Rome. Lepidus' forces were defeated in a battle near the Milvian Bridge and he fled to Sardinia. He was the father of the triumvir Lepidus and of the Lucius Aemilius Lepidus Paullus who was consul in 50 BC.

== Early career ==
During the Social War, Lepidus fought in northern Italy under Pompey Strabo, who was consul in 89 BC. He was probably aedile while Sulla was in Greece fighting the First Mithridatic War. By 82 BC, he had joined Sulla's side in the civil war; that year, or perhaps early in the next year, he may have captured the city of Norba in Latium. Some time, during Sulla's dictatorship, he held the praetorship. T R S Broughton, in Magistrates of the Roman Republic, dates this to 81 BC, a proposition with which T Corey Brennan agreed in Praetorship in the Roman Republic. Sulla's proscriptions made Lepidus a fortune.

After his praetorship, Lepidus became propraetorian governor of Sicily, dated 80 BC. While Cicero, in the Verrines, blackens Lepidus' reputation as governor, these orations were written after Lepidus' dishonourable death in a context where it would have been difficult to separate invective against Lepidus and flattery for his successors from the truth. Regardless, it seems that his behaviour in Sicily was sufficient to prompt a prosecution by Metellus Nepos and Metellus Celer, men then in their youth. However, that the prosecution was dropped rapidly and without consequence for Lepidus' career – he was almost immediately elected consul – indicates either that the Metelli's case was weak or that Lepidus was too popular (possibly for his ability to successfully ship Sicilian grain to Rome) to be defeated in the courts.

== Consulship ==
Lepidus was elected as consul prior for 78 BC with Quintus Lutatius Catulus as his colleague. Ronald Syme believed that there were only two candidates that year, but it is likely that the election was freely contested. According to Plutarch, Pompey supported his election and canvassed for him, against the wishes of Sulla, who did not trust Lepidus. Plutarch's claims about the importance of Pompey's help cannot be taken at face value, due to his "tendency to exaggerate the impact of the major players"; Lepidus' noble ancestry, public work on the basilica Aemilia, and possible bribery (per Sallust) also played to his advantage in the election. It also is unclear whether Sulla in fact opposed Lepidus' candidature.

During his term, Lepidus exploited the grievances of those who had lost the civil war against Sulla, campaigning against a public funeral for Sulla, who had died that year, and also for a damnatio memoriae on the dictator. However, his consular colleague Quintus Lutatius Catulus, with the support of Pompey, was successful in securing the dictator a lavish public funeral, perhaps out of the interest of the post-Sullan victors to legitimise Sulla's laws and reforms. Lepidus continued however to agitate for the restoration of confiscated property, re-enfranchisement of those who lost their civil or political rights under Sulla, recall of exiled citizens, and repeal of Sullan legislation. Many of those who had profited or otherwise benefitted from the proscriptions opposed recall of the exiles, fearing that the exiles would initiate prosecutions or demand return of their former property.

Lepidus also was successful in securing the passage of a lex frumentaria (law providing for the distribution of grain) to the urban plebs. He opposed, however, restoration of the political rights of the tribunes, arguing – in a now lost speech – that restoration would not be in the public interest. He also quarrelled with his colleague over the appointment of an urban prefect.

Lepidus' populist rhetoric "brought results, perhaps even unforeseen results" when, at Faesulae in Etruria, the townsmen attacked Sulla's veteran colonies. Lepidus and his colleague Catulus were assigned by the senate to deal with the emergency. Gruen remarks explicitly that "evidently the senate did not feel that Lepidus'... pronouncements had compromised him to the point where he could not be sent to stifle an insurrection inspired by his own propaganda". Lepidus had expected to widen his political support after Sulla's death by canvassing with opponents of the dictator, actions which were not seen by the senate as indicative of revolutionary sedition.

Soon after arriving in Etruria, however, the insurgents acclaimed Lepidus as their leader, a position he accepted in the face of mass popular support in the region. Even after Lepidus had sided with the rebels, the senate did not act against him, awarding him the provinces of Gallia Transalpina and Cisalpina by regular procedure and instructed the two consuls not to engage in conflict with each other. This indicates substantial support for Lepidus still existed in the senate. It was only when Lepidus was ordered to return home to conduct consular elections did the senate turn against him: he demanded a consecutive consulship, "a condition which he must have known was unacceptable", and refused.

== Rebellion ==
In his absence and no elections, an interrex was appointed and held elections which saw Mamercus Aemilius Lepidus Livianus and Decimus Junius Brutus elected consuls. The result was transparently manipulated, with a competitor of Mamercus Lepidus forced to withdraw his candidacy. That said, the result itself ensured a clear public statement, however, that the Aemilii Lepidi and Junii Bruti as families "would survive the elimination of two rogue individual members".

Early in 77 BC under the new consuls, a senatus consultum ultimum was passed against this Lepidus at the urging of Lucius Marcius Philippus (consul in 91 and ex-censor), instructing the proconsul Catulus, interrex Appius Claudius Pulcher, and other magistrates to defend the state. Arrayed against the senate in Lepidus' camp included the younger Lucius Cornelius Cinna (son of the Cinna who had died in 84 BC), Marcus Junius Brutus (father of the tyrannicide), one Marcus Perperna, and a Scipio; a young Julius Caesar's support was solicited, but he declined.

As Catulus had a lacklustre military reputation, the senate also called upon Pompey, giving him an extraordinary command against the Lepidus. Pompey, invested as a legate pro praetore, quickly recruited an army from among his veterans and shadowed Lepidus, who had marched his army to Rome, from the north. Catulus, who had recruited an army at Rome, now took on Lepidus directly, defeating him in a battle north of Rome. Meanwhile, Pompey had penned up Marcus Junius Brutus, one of Lepidus's commanders, in Mutina. Pompey then marched against Lepidus' rear, catching him near Cosa; although Lepidus was again defeated, he was able to embark part of his army and retreated to Sardinia. He died in Sardinia shortly thereafter, defeated by one Valerius Triarius (praenomen unknown) who was assigned there pro praetore.

== Family ==
Pliny the Elder noted that Lepidus divorced his wife Appuleia but he does not give a date. She was related to Lucius Appuleius Saturninus. He enriched himself during Sulla's proscriptions. Pliny the Elder thought that he had the most beautiful house in Rome, with marble thresholds and shields with the battle scenes of Troy.

== Bibliography ==
- Badian, Ernst (2012). "Aemilius Lepidus, Marcus (2), Roman consul, 78 BC". Oxford Classical Dictionary (4th ed.). Oxford University Press. doi:10.1093/acrefore/9780199381135.013.114. ISBN 978-0-19-938113-5.
- Brennan, T Corey (2000). The praetorship in the Roman republic. Vol. 2. Oxford University Press. ISBN 0-19-511460-4. LCCN 99-35017.
- Broughton, Thomas Robert Shannon (1952). The magistrates of the Roman republic. Vol. 2. New York: American Philological Association.
- Flower, Harriet I (2010). Roman republics. Princeton University Press. ISBN 978-0-691-14043-8. OCLC 301798480.
- Gruen, Erich S (1995). Last generation of the Roman republic (Paperback ed.). Berkeley. ISBN 0-520-02238-6. OCLC 943848.
- Hayne, Leonie (1972). "M Lepidus (cos 78): a re-appraisal". Historia: Zeitschrift für Alte Geschichte. 21 (4): 661–668. ISSN 0018-2311. JSTOR 4435296.
- Rosenblitt, Alison (2014). "The turning tide: the politics of the year 79 BCE". Transactions of the American Philological Association. 144 (2): 415–444. ISSN 0360-5949. JSTOR 43830445.

Political offices
Preceded by P. Servilius Vatia; Ap. Claudius Pulcher	Roman consul 78 BC; With: Q. Lutatius Catulus	Succeeded by D. Junius Brutus; Mam. Aemilius Lepidus Livianus
