= Hispania Ulterior =

Region of Hispania during the Roman Republic

- Province of the Roman Republic
- 197 BC–19 BC
- In green, Hispania Ulterior in 197 BC.
- Capital: Corduba (Córdoba)
- Historical era: Antiquity
  - Established: 197 BC
  - Disestablished: 19 BC
| Succeeded by |
| Hispania Baetica |
- Today part of: Spain; Gibraltar; Portugal

Hispania Ulterior (English: "Further Hispania", or occasionally "Thither Hispania") was a Roman province located in Hispania (on the Iberian Peninsula) during the Roman Republic, roughly located in Baetica and in the Guadalquivir valley of modern Spain and extending to all of Lusitania (modern Portugal, Extremadura and a small part of Salamanca province) and Gallaecia (modern Northern Portugal and Galicia). Its capital was Corduba.

== Etymology ==
Hispania is the Latin term given to the Iberian Peninsula. The term can be traced back to at least 200 BC when the term was used by the poet Quintus Ennius. The word is possibly derived from the Punic אי שפן I-Shaphan meaning "coast of hyraxes", in turn a misidentification on the part of Phoenician explorers of its numerous rabbits as hyraxes. Ulterior is the comparative form of ulter, which means "that is beyond". According to ancient historian Cassius Dio, the people of the region came from many different tribes. They did not share a common language or a common government.

== History ==
After losing control of Sicily, Sardinia and Corsica in the First Punic War, Carthage began to expand into the south of the Iberian peninsula. Soon afterwards, the Second Punic War began. Much of that war between Carthage and Rome took place in Hispania until Scipio Africanus effectively seized control of Hispania from Hannibal and the Carthaginians in the Battle of Ilipa in 206 BC. Four years later, Carthage surrendered and ceded its control of the region to Rome after Carthage's defeat in 201 BC.

In 197 BC, the peninsula was divided into two provinces because of the presence of two military forces during its conquest. These two regions were Hispania Citerior (Nearer Hispania) and Hispania Ulterior (Further Hispania). The boundary was generally along a line passing from Carthago Nova to the Cantabrian Sea. Hispania Ulterior consisted of what are now Andalusia, Portugal, Extremadura, Castilla y León, Galicia, Asturias, Cantabria, and the Basque Country.

There was peace in the region until 155 BC when the Lusitanians attacked Hispania Ulterior. Twice defeating Roman praetors, their success soon sparked a number of other rebellions in the peninsula. The Iberian Peninsula became a centre of military activity and an opportunity for advancement. As Appian claimed, “[the consuls] took the command not for the advantage of the city [Rome], but for glory, or gain, or the honour of a triumph.” The area was largely conquered by the consul Decimus Junius Brutus Callaicus in 138 BC, but war continued until 19 BC when Agrippa defeated the Cantabrians in Hispania Citerior and Hispania finally was completely conquered. That same year, with the subjugation of all Hispania and the end of the Cantabrian Wars, Augustus reorganised the provinces in the peninsula. Hispania Ulterior was divided into Baetica (modern Andalusia) and Lusitania (modern Portugal, Extremadura, and part of Castilla-León). Hispania Citerior, which now included Cantabria and Basque country, was renamed Hispania Tarraconensis. Gaius Julius Caesar was the governor of Hispania Ulterior from 61-60 BC.

In the early fifth-century AD, the Vandals invaded and took over the south of Hispania. The Roman Emperor Honorius commissioned his brother-in-law, the Visigoth king, Athaulf, to defeat the Vandals. The Visigoths seized control of Hispania and made Toledo the capital of their country.

== Roman effects on Hispania ==
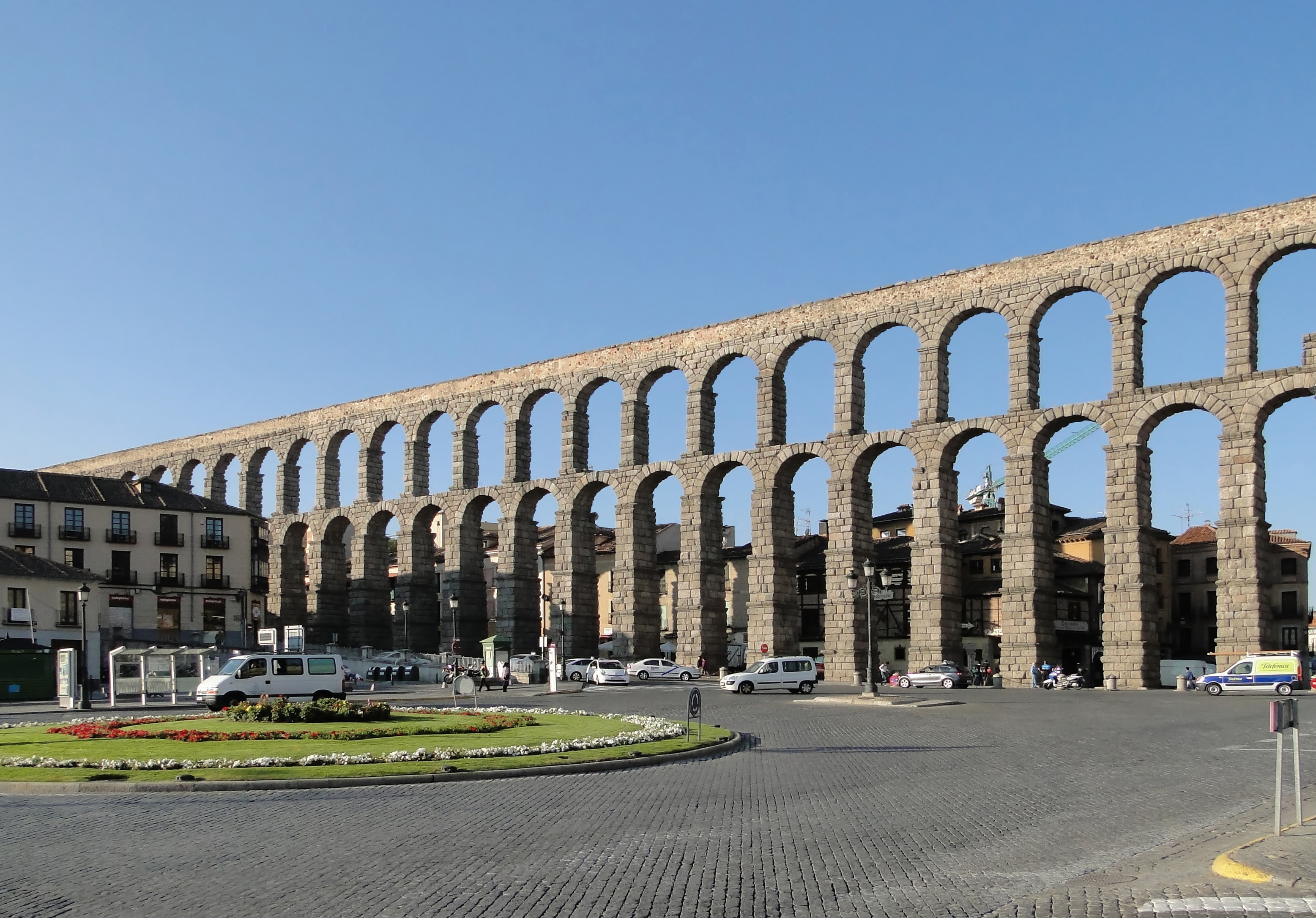
Roman aqueduct in Hispania at Segovia

Each province was to be ruled by a praetor. Members of the tribal elite of Hispania were introduced into the Roman aristocracy and allowed to participate in their own governance. Roman emperors Trajan, Hadrian and Theodosius I were all born in Hispania. Roman latifundia were granted to members of the aristocracy throughout the region. Cities in Hispania Citerior such as Valencia were enhanced and irrigation aqueducts were introduced. The economy thrived as a granary as well as by exporting gold, olive oil, wool, and wine.

== See also ==
- Pre-Roman peoples of the Iberian Peninsula
