= Wives of Pompey the Great =

Roman statesman's five marriages

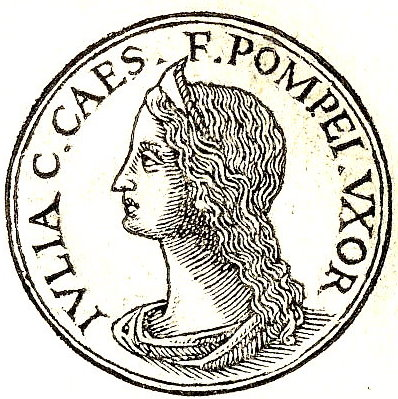
Julia, in a 16th century artist's fanciful illustration. Julia, Pompey's fourth wife, was Julius Caesar's only legitimate child.

The first-century-BCE Roman statesman and commander Pompey the Great was married five times. These marriages were not only romantic matches, but political arrangements, often dictated by Pompey's political career and need to form alliances with other powerful Roman men.

Pompey's first marriage, in 86 BCE, was to Antistia, the daughter of a judge who was overseeing Pompey's trial for financial misconduct. In 82 or 81 BCE, he was influenced to divorce Antistia in favour of Aemilia, stepdaughter of the dictator Sulla; Aemilia died in childbirth shortly afterwards. He married Mucia Tertia in 79 BCE, this time gaining an alliance with the powerful gens Caecilia: this was Pompey's longest marriage, and produced all three of his surviving children. He divorced Mucia in 61 BCE, possibly for political reasons, and married Julia, the daughter of his political rival Julius Caesar, in 59 BCE. Finally, after Julia's death in 54 BCE, he married Cornelia Metella, who survived him after his own assassination in 48 BCE.

According to the classicist Shelley Haley, Pompey "made use of marriage in a traditional fashion to further his political career", but emphasis on Pompey's ambition has often "caused the modern scholar to lose sight of the woman in such an alliance and to ignore the intimate relationships possible at the heart of such a marriage." For most of these marriages, few or no primary sources exist, and it is often difficult to establish matters of fact amidst the political biases and agendas of later historians.

Pompey's wives have also featured in post-Roman literature and art, such as Pierre Corneille's plays Sertorius and The Death of Pompey, as well as George Frideric Handel's opera Giulio Cesare.

== Marriage in the Late Republic ==
Pompey's approach to marriage has been described as "traditionalist". For aristocrats of the Roman Republic, marriage was a significant means of forming political alliances and thereby advancing in society. It is generally considered that romantic attraction, while not necessarily absent, was not the primary consideration in the arrangement of such marriages, which were usually arranged — and, at least legally, had to be approved — by the paterfamilias of both partners. The importance of such marriage alliances has been debated: Erich Gruen has described them as a fundamental mechanism behind Roman political coalitions, while scholars such as Peter Brunt have suggested that factions coalesced around individual personalities more than around family alliances. (Note: As cited in Gruen 1995, p. xii)

Pompey's 'serial marriage' has been held up as an example of the double standard applied to elite Roman men, for whom multiple marriage was seen as usual, and to women, who were expected to ascribe to a cultural ideal of having only one husband throughout their lives.

Scholarly attention has often focused on the political aspects of such marriages, particularly for the men involved, at the expense of the personal aspects, which in turn has led to a disproportionate focus on the male partners over their wives. While these women have been likened to "sacks of cash" handed around by their families for political, social or economic gain, scholars have also highlighted the extent to which some aristocratic women were able to use marriage to promote their own or their families' interests. Pompey, for his part, has been described as a "faithful husband" who appears to have felt genuine love towards at least his later wives.

== Sources for Pompey's marriages ==
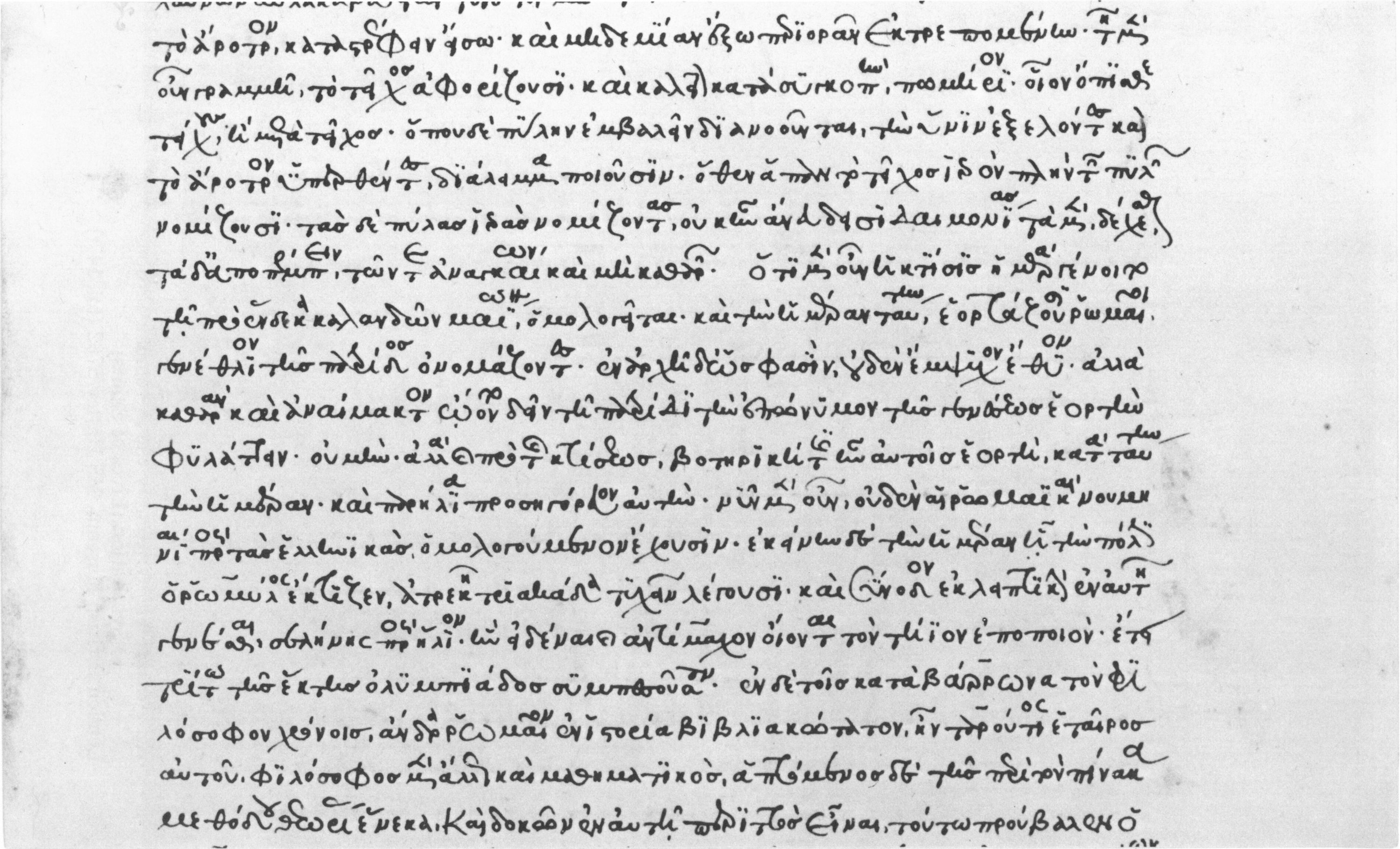
A 1362 Byzantine manuscript of Plutarch's Parallel Lives, the main source for Pompey's five marriages

The primary surviving source for Pompey's wives and marriages is Plutarch's Parallel Lives. All are treated in some length in his Life of Pompey, though he also included details of Pompey's divorce from Antistia in the Life of Sulla, and aspects of the life and marriage of Julia are treated in the Life of Caesar. Plutarch was born c. 46 CE, approximately 130 years after the events he describes.

Plutarch's account is known to be based on sources hostile to Pompey, such as Oppius, a Caesarian propagandist whose work Plutarch consulted while writing the Life of Pompey. Plutarch's biography of Pompey has been criticised for subsuming chronological and factual accuracy to its author's aesthetic and political aims, while Keith Hopkins has suggested that the motives imputed by Plutarch to the various characters should be regarded as "suspect".

The letters of Cicero, an early ally and perhaps personal friend of Pompey's, allude briefly to his marriages to Mucia and Julia. His relationships are also mentioned, mostly in passing, by the later historians Cassius Dio, Appian, Asconius and Suetonius.

== Antistia (86–82/81 BCE) ==
Antistia was the daughter of Publius Antistius, a Roman lawyer, orator and politician from the relatively obscure gens Antistia. She married Pompey in 86 BCE, and he divorced her in 82 or 81 BCE in favour of Aemilia, the stepdaughter of Sulla. (Note: On the date, see Aemilia (82/81 BCE) below.)

In 86 BCE, (Note: The trial is generally dated to 86 BCE based on the statement by Plutarch that it occurred shortly after the death of Pompey's father in 87. Hillman rejected the argument of Sumner that Antistius must have first have been aedile to be able to preside over a court, and that the trial should thus be dated to 85 to allow for an aedileship the previous year.) in his capacity as iudex, (Note: Plutarch seems to describe Antistius as a praetor, but this conflicts with a statement by Velleius Paterculus that he had the rank of aedile when he died. It is generally assumed that Plutarch simply made a mistake when reporting his rank.) Antistius presided over the trial of Pompey for embezzlement of public funds (peculatus) during the Social War. The trial has been largely characterised as a sham, with its outcome assured from the start. Antistius showed favour to Pompey throughout the trial, and secretly promised Antistia to him in marriage while the proceedings were still ongoing — a fact which, however, became common knowledge: when Antistius announced the verdict of acquittal, Plutarch reports that the crowd began shouting "Talasio!", the customary acclamation of a marriage.

Antistia's marriage to Pompey has generally been interpreted as a cynical political move: on Antistius' part, as an effort to increase his standing through alliance to an up-and-coming young nobleman, and as an equally-cynical attempt by Pompey to influence his trial, as well as to gain the favour and patronage of Antistius and his family. Erich Gruen has described it as the first of Pompey's marriages intended to give him "access to the inner citadels of senatorial power".

No children are known from the marriage, which is generally assumed to have been childless.

Pompey's divorce from Antistia in 81 or 82 BCE seems to have been painful for him: Plutarch writes that it "befitted the needs of Sulla rather than the nature and habits of Pompey", in that Aemilia was already pregnant by her current husband, the future consul Manius Acilius Glabrio. The divorce followed the murder of Antistia's father in 82 BCE, carried out by Marian supporters under the praetor Junius Damasippus, who viewed Antistius as unreliable due to his marriage alliance with Pompey. Her mother, Calpurnia, also killed herself upon hearing of the divorce, which Plutarch described as an 'indignity'. Little is known of Antistia's reaction to the divorce, or of her life afterwards. (Note: It has been claimed that Antistia also killed herself, but this has no basis in Classical sources, and would appear to be a misreading of Plutarch's comment on Calpurnia.)

== Aemilia (82/81 BCE) ==
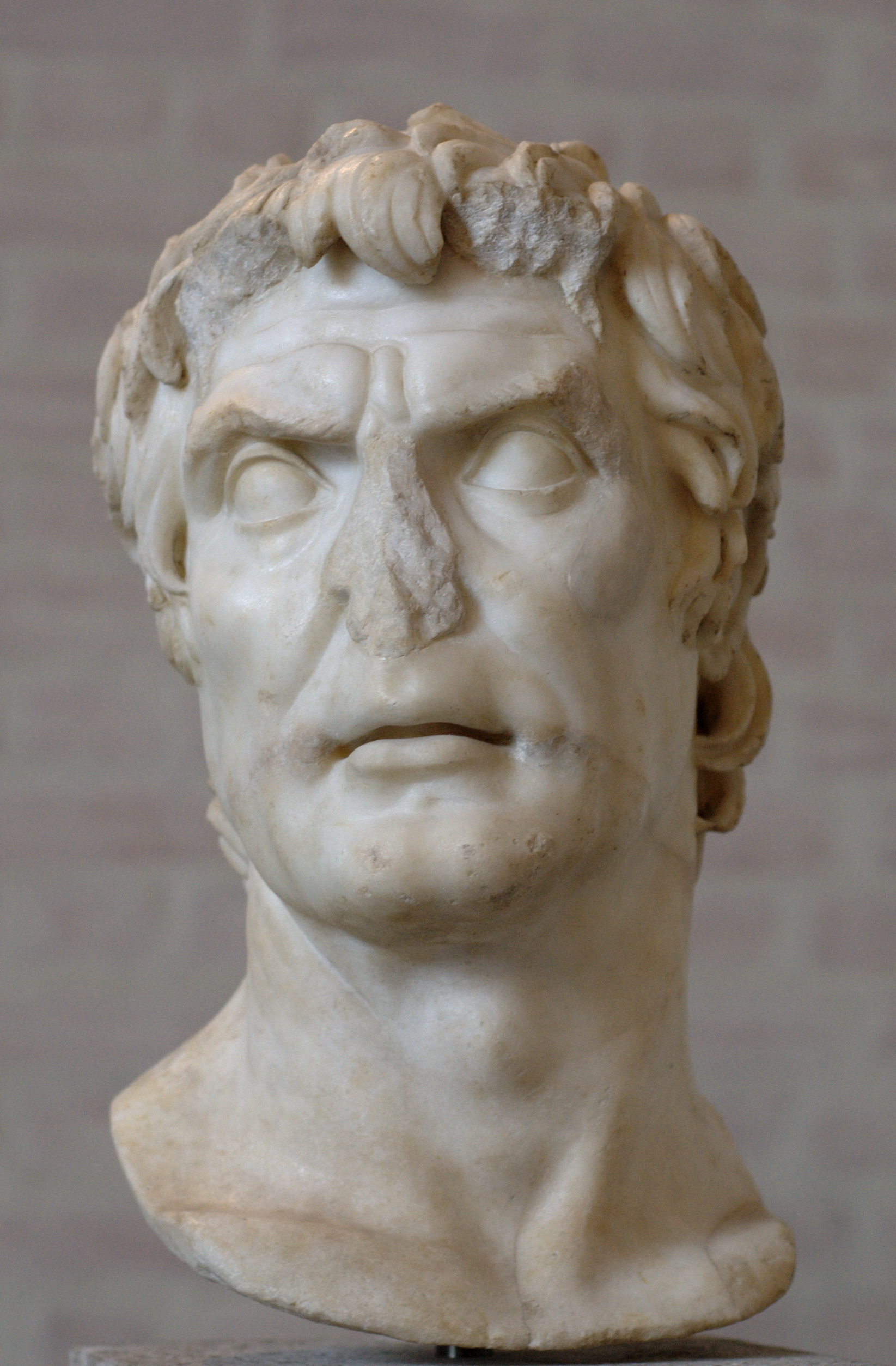
A Roman portrait bust conventionally identified as Sulla, the instigator of Pompey's marriage to Aemilia

Aemilia was the daughter of Sulla's fourth wife, Caecilia Metella, who had married Sulla after the death of Aemilia's father, Marcus Aemilius Scaurus.

In 82 or 81 BCE, Sulla and his wife Caecilia Metella persuaded Pompey to divorce Antistia in favour of Sulla's stepdaughter, Aemilia. The reasons for the marriage are ambiguous, and perhaps mixed: Plutarch explains the marriage through Sulla's desire to reward Pompey for his successful service in the civil war against the Marians during 83–82, and to make a marriage alliance with a capable man who could be of use to him. However, the marriage has also been characterised as Sulla's attempt to neutralise the potential threat of Pompey's popularity and growing power.

Caecilia Metella died around 1 November 81 BCE. Aemilia's marriage to Pompey took place somewhat earlier: scholars variously place it in 82 BCE. or early in 81. At this point, Pompey was around twenty-four years old. According to Plutarch, Aemilia was reluctant to divorce her previous husband, Manius Acilius Glabrio, and had to be "torn away" from the marriage. The persistence of Aemilia's doubts in the historical record has been taken as evidence against the suggestion that all Roman women were content to be used by their families for political gain.

Aemilia, who had already been pregnant by her previous husband Glabrio, died giving birth to her son, named Manius Acilius Glabrio after his father, soon after the marriage was concluded.

As with Pompey's relationship with Antistia, the facts of his marriage to Aemilia are known entirely from Plutarch's Lives. Keith Hopkins has characterised Plutarch's implications as to the motives behind the marriage as "suspect", while Hillman has suggested that Plutarch's account is primarily concerned with making political points about Sulla's tyranny and presenting the affair through a tragic lens, with comparatively little regard for the facts of the story or its chronological accuracy.

The divorce was criticised in Roman society: the damage it caused to Pompey's reputation has been cited as a factor in his cultivation of an alliance with Marcus Aemilius Lepidus, the father of the future triumvir, in 79 BCE.

== Mucia Tertia (79–61 BCE) ==
Mucia was a half-sister of Quintus Metellus Celer and Quintus Metellus Nepos, both members of the powerful gens Caecilia, which may have been a significant factor behind the marriage. She had either been betrothed or married to Gaius Marius the Younger, who died by suicide in 82 BCE. Her family had previously been allies of Sulla, Pompey's patron, and Sulla himself had married into it.

Mucia was the mother of all three of Pompey's children that survived to adulthood: a daughter, Pompeia, and two sons, Sextus and Gnaeus. She worked informally as an intermediary between her husband and other political figures: when Cicero sought an alliance with Pompey, he went first to Mucia.

Pompey divorced Mucia in 61 BCE, for reasons that remain unclear. Contemporary sources, such as Cicero, give little explanation: in his letters, which Plutarch cited as a source for the cause of the divorce, Cicero claims that 'Mucia's divorce is heartily approved of' Shelley Haley has suggested that 'politics seem to have been the overriding concern' in the divorce: specifically, that Pompey wished to divorce Mucia in order to make a further marriage alliance through another match. From 67 BCE, the interests of the Metelli diverged from Pompey's over his treatment of Lucullus, their relative, whom Pompey deprived of command in the Third Mithridatic War.

A later tradition, possibly beginning with Plutarch, (Note: Plutarch, Life of Pompey 42.7) claimed that Mucia had been unfaithful: Suetonius alleged that Julius Caesar had seduced her, (Note: Suetonius, Divus Julius ('The Divine Julius Caesar'), 50.1) leading to his acquisition of the nickname 'Aegisthus' after the seducer of Agamemnon's wife Clytemnestra in Greek mythology. Erich Gruen has suggested that Pompey's divorce from Mucia was motivated by a desire to render himself eligible for remarriage to a niece of Cato the Younger, and thereby to create a marriage alliance with the latter's family.

Pompey's divorce broke his alliance with the Metelli and attracted the enmity of her brothers Celer and Nepos. It also created a rift between Pompey and Marcus Aemilius Scaurus, whom she married within a year, and with whom she had at least one son, named after his father. When Scaurus was prosecuted for extortion in 54 BCE, Pompey refused to support him — still, according to Asconius Pedianus, angry that Scaurus had humiliated him, and asserted Mucia's respectability, by marrying her so quickly.

After the divorce, Mucia retained a respected position in Roman society and was known for her diplomatic skills. She may have played a personal role, along with Nepos' own indignity at her treatment, in breaking her brother away from Pompey's faction. During the conflict between Octavian, Mark Antony and her son Sextus in 40–39 BCE, Mucia represented Octavian in talks with Sextus Pompey, making her the first Roman woman recorded as fulfilling an official diplomatic role. After the Battle of Actium in September 31 BCE, she successfully negotiated for the life of her youngest son. This is the last mention of Mucia in the historical record; her date of death is unknown.

== Julia (59–54 BCE) ==
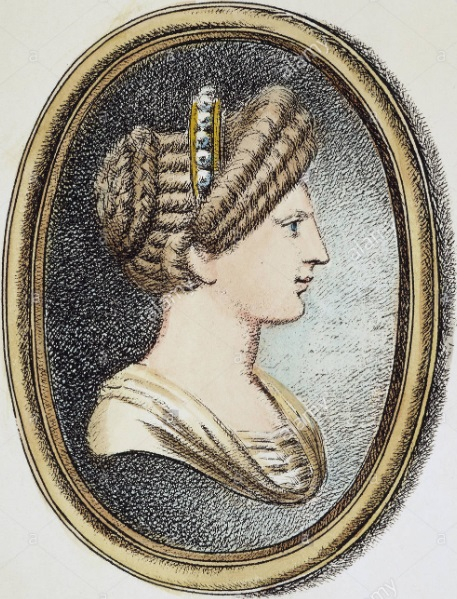
An imagined 18th-century likeness of Julia

Julia was probably born around 76 BCE, making her around seventeen at the time of her marriage to Pompey, who was by then forty-seven years old. After the death of her mother Cornelia, in 69 BCE, she was raised by her paternal grandmother, Aurelia Cotta.

In 61 BCE, Pompey proposed to marry one of Cato the Younger's two nieces, the other of whom would be married to Pompey's son. Cato rejected the offer, against, according to Plutarch, the protestations of both his sister and his wife. According to Erich Gruen, Pompey likely intended the proposal as a means to increase his own dignitas and status within the Roman aristocracy, as well as a means of creating an alliance with what Gruen considers to have been his most influential political opponent.

In April 59 BCE, Caesar broke off Julia's engagement to a Servilius Caepio — speculated as Marcus Junius Brutus, Caesar's assassin, known as Quintus Servilius Caepio Brutus after his adoption by his uncle — and married her to Pompey. Along with Caesar's contemporary marriage to Calpurnia (the daughter of the powerful Lucius Calpurnius Piso), his betrothal of Julia to Pompey has been described as "a design to cover all his [Caesar's] flanks".

Plutarch reported that the marriage was received in Rome as a surprise. (Note: Plutarch, Life of Pompey 47.6) Cicero was suspicious of the match, referring to Pompey as "Sampsiceramus" (a petty king of Emesa, whose kingdom Pompey had himself conquered), (Note: Sampisceramus. Charlton T. Lewis and Charles Short. A Latin Dictionary on Perseus Project.) and writing to Atticus that Pompey was "self-confessedly seeking to become a tyrant." (Note: Ad Atticum 2.17.1: Greek: ὁμολογουμένως τυραννίδα συσκευάζεται) Cato, meanwhile, protested that "it was intolerable to have the supreme power prostituted by marriage alliances". (Note: Plutarch, Life of Caesar 14.7, trans. Jeffrey Henderson.) However, both Pompey and Julia were later portrayed as being personally devoted to each other, to the extent that Plutarch accused him of neglecting his public duties in favour of his marriage.

Julia may have encouraged Pompey to become interested in literature and to patronise writers, and may also have accompanied in his dedication of the Theatre of Pompey in 55 BCE.

Plutarch relates that Julia became pregnant by Pompey, but miscarried. According to his narrative, a riot broke out near Pompey during an election of aediles, which Guy Chilver and Robin Seager date to 55 BCE. Pompey was unharmed, but his clothes were stained with blood. When Julia saw the bloodstained clothes being brought home by Pompey's slaves, she thought that her husband must have been killed: she fainted and miscarried. (Note: Plutarch, Life of Pompey 53.3)

Julia became pregnant for a second time, with a daughter, but died in childbirth in 54 BCE: the daughter died a few days later. Pompey intended to bury Julia at his Alban villa, but the people of Rome carried her body to the Campus Martius to be buried there: according to Plutarch, this was both motivated by pity for Julia and out of respect for her father, Julius Caesar. (Note: Plutarch, Life of Pompey 53.4–5) Her death has been cited as a contributing factor to the breakdown of relations between Caesar and Pompey.

Suetonius reports that Gaius Memmius, a former partisan of Pompey's who had turned to Caesar, attempted to seduce one of Pompey's wives through letters delivered by Nicias of Kos, whom Pompey had previously assisted to gain Roman citizenship. She, however, revealed the letters to her husband, leading him to banish Nicias from his house. The affair has variously been associated with Julia and with Cornelia. Memmius would be exiled from Rome in 52 BCE under the lex Pompeia de ambitu, a law which Pompey himself introduced in the same year.

== Cornelia Metella (52–48 BCE) ==
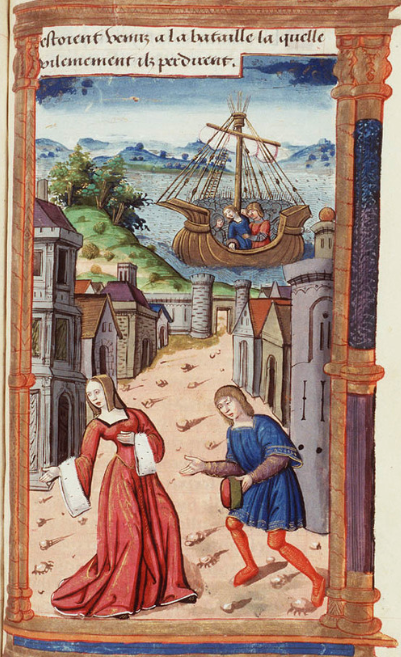
A fanciful illustration of Pompey's return to Lesbos after the Battle of Pharsalus (c. 1500): Cornelia, who hears the messenger weep instead of speaking, faints from the shock.

Shortly after the death of Julia in 54 BCE, Caesar offered for his great-niece, Octavia the Younger, who was presently married to the ex-consul Gaius Claudius Marcellus, as a new wife for Pompey. The couple were, however, reluctant to divorce, and Pompey at any rate turned down the proposal.

Cornelia was born around 73 BCE. She had previously been married to Publius Licinius Crassus, the son of the triumvir Marcus Licinius Crassus; the death of both Crassi in 53 BCE at the Battle of Carrhae rendered her eligible for marriage to Pompey. Pompey's marriage to Cornelia has been seen as a means of establishing a marriage alliance with one of Rome's most powerful families, and as a political match much in the vein of his previous four marriages.

Cornelia was celebrated for her education: she was a skilled lyre-player and described by Plutarch as a cultivated person. According to Shelley Haley, Pompey showed her "deep and lasting affection". Unlike his previous wives, Cornelia accompanied Pompey during his military campaigns of Caesar's civil war, which broke out in 49 BCE. Just before the Battle of Pharsalus in 48 BCE, Pompey sent her to Lesbos, where he joined her after his defeat. According to Appian, her presence was an influential factor in Pompey's flight to Egypt: he had wished to seek refuge in Parthia, but his friends advised against placing Cornelia "in the power" of such "barbarians". (Note: Haley 1985, p. 56; Appian, Civil War 2.83) When Pompey came ashore, however, he was killed by Egyptian dignitaries as Cornelia and his son, Sextus, watched from their ship: both Cornelia and Sextus escaped, though Sextus would later be executed in 35 BCE by Marcus Titius, a commander serving under Caesar's heir and adopted son, Octavian. Cornelia, however, was pardoned and able to return to Rome, where Caesar returned to her Pompey's ashes and signet ring. Nothing is known of her after this event.

Like Julia, Cornelia seems to have been popular in Rome, or at least to have avoided personal insult and censure from Pompey's critics.

== Bibliography ==
- Africa, Thomas W. (1978). "The Mask of an Assassin: A Psychohistorical Study of M. Junius Brutus". Journal of Interdisciplinary History. 8 (4): 599–626. doi:10.2307/203080. JSTOR 203080.
- Bauman, Richard A. (2003) [1992]. Women and politics in Ancient Rome. London and New York: Routledge. ISBN 0-415-05777-9.
- British Museum (2018-11-28). "Cornelia Metella".
- Chilver, Guy Edward Farquhar; Seager, Robin J. (2015). "Iulia (2)". In Hornblower, Simon; Eidinow, Esther; Spawforth, Anthony (eds.). The Oxford Classical Dictionary. Oxford University Press. p. 754. doi:10.1093/acrefore/9780199381135.013.3368.
- Chrystal, Paul (2007). Roman Women: The Women who influenced the History of Rome. Fonthill Media. ISBN 978-1781552872.
- Freisenbruch, Annelise (2011). Caesars' Wives: Sex, Power, and Politics in the Roman Empire. New York: Atria Books. ISBN 9781416583059.
- Gelzer, Matthias (1968) [1921]. Caesar: Politician and Statesman. Translated by Peter Needham. Harvard University Press. ISBN 9780674090019.
- Gruen, Erich S. (1995) [1974]. The Last Generation of the Roman Republic. Berkeley: University of California Press. ISBN 0-520-20153-1.
- Gruen, Erich S. (1969). "Pompey, the Roman Aristocracy, and the Conference of Luca". Historia: Zeitschrift für Alte Geschichte. 18 (1): 71–108. JSTOR 4435061.
- Gruen, Erich S. (1968a). "Pompey and the Pisones". California Studies in Classical Antiquity. 1: 155–170. doi:10.2307/25010571. JSTOR 25010571.
- Gruen, Erich S. (1968b). Roman Politics and the Criminal Courts, 149–78 B.C. Cambridge, MA, US: Harvard University Press. ISBN 0-674-28420-8.
- Haley, Shelley (1985). "The Five Wives of Pompey the Great". Greece and Rome. 32 (1): 49–59. doi:10.1017/S0017383500030138. JSTOR 642299. S2CID 154822339.
- Hallett, Judith P. (2014) [1984]. Fathers and Daughters in Roman Society: Women and the Elite Family. Princeton University Press. ISBN 9781400855322.
- Hillman, Thomas P. (1997). "Pompeius in Africa and Sulla's Order to demobilize (Plutarch, Pompeius 13,1-4)". Latomus. 56 (1): 94–106. JSTOR 41537907.
- Hillman, Thomas P. (1998). "Notes on the trial of Pompeius at Plutarch, Pomp. 4.1–6" (PDF). Rheinisches Museum für Philologie. 141 (2): 176–193. JSTOR 41234316.
- Hogan, Patrick (2006). "Curtias Nicias". Lexicon of Greek Grammarians of Antiquity. Brill.
- Hölkeskamp, Karl-Joachim (2014). "Under Roman Roofs: Family, House and Household". In Flower, Harriet I. (ed.). The Cambridge Companion to the Roman Republic (2nd ed.). Cambridge University Press. pp. 101–126. doi:10.1017/CCO9781139424783. ISBN 9781139424783.
- Hopkins, Keith (1985) [1983]. Death and Renewal: Volume 2: Sociological Studies in Roman History. Cambridge University Press. ISBN 9780521271172.
- Hughes, Sarah Shaver; Hughes, Brady (2015). Women in World History: Volume 1: Readings from Prehistory to 1500. New York: Taylor and Francis. ISBN 9781317451853.
- Kelly, G.P. (2006). A History of Exile in the Roman Republic. Cambridge University Press. doi:10.1017/CBO9780511584558. ISBN 9780511584558.
- Lancaster, Henry Carrington (1966). A History of French Dramatic Literature in the Seventeenth Century: Volume 3: The Age of Molière: Part 2. New York: Gordian Press.
- Lendering, Jona (2020) [2007]. "Octavia Minor". Livius. Archived from the original on 2022-02-08.
- Lightman, Marjorie; Lightman, Benjamin (2008a). "Aemilia(3)". A to Z of Ancient Greek and Roman Women. New York: Facts on File. p. 3. ISBN 9781438107943.
- Lightman, Marjorie; Lightman, Benjamin (2008b). "Antistia (2)". A to Z of Ancient Greek and Roman Women. New York: Facts on File. p. 23. ISBN 9781438107943.
- MacLachlan, Bonnie (2013). Women in Ancient Rome: A Sourcebook. London: Bloomsbury. ISBN 9781441153852.
- Marin, Pamela (2009). Blood in the Forum: The Struggle for the Roman Republic. London: Bloomsbury. ISBN 9781441129154.
- Marroquín, Lucía Díaz (2022). "Quintilian and the Performing Arts". In Edwards, Michael; Murphy, James J. (eds.). The Oxford Companion to Quintilian. Oxford University Press. pp. 278–298.
- Paley, Frederick Apthorp; Mitchell, John Malcolm (1911). "Plutarch" . In Chisholm, Hugh (ed.). Encyclopædia Britannica. Vol. 21 (11th ed.). Cambridge University Press. pp. 857–860.
- Rohr Vio, Francesca (2022). Powerful Matrons. New Political Actors in the Late Roman Republic. Prensas Universitarias de Zaragoza. ISBN 9788413404523.
- Rosenblitt, Alison (2014). "The Turning Tide: The Politics of the Year 79 B.C.E". Transactions of the American Philological Association. 144 (2): 415–444. doi:10.1353/apa.2014.0008. JSTOR 43830445. S2CID 144556938.
- Smith, William (1849). "Antistia Gens". Dictionary of Greek and Roman Biography and Mythology. Vol. 1. Boston: Little, Brown and Company. p. 209.
- Sumner, G.V. (1973). The Orators in Cicero's Brutus: Prosopography and Chronology. University of Toronto Press. ISBN 0-8020-5281-9.
- Syme, Ronald (2002) [1939]. The Roman Revolution. Oxford University Press. ISBN 9780192803207.
- Telford, Lynda (2014). Sulla: A Dictator Reconsidered. Barnsley: Pen & Sword Military. ISBN 9781783030484.
- Ward, Allen M.; Heichelheim, Fritz M.; Yeo, Cedric A. (2016) [1962]. A History of the Roman People. New York: Taylor and Francis. ISBN 9781315511207.
- Ward, Allen M. (1970). "The Early Relationships between Cicero and Pompey until 80 B.C.". Phoenix. 24 (2): 119–129. doi:10.2307/1087775. JSTOR 1087775.
