= Antistia =

Antistia may refer to:

- Antistia gens, an ancient Roman family
- Antistia (mantis), a genus of mantises
- Antistia (1st c. BCE), a Roman woman married to Pompey
