= Antistia (wife of Pompey) =

First wife of Pompey the Great

- Years active: 86–c. 82 BCE
- Known for: Marriage to and divorce from Pompey
- Spouse(s): Pompey (86 – 82/81 BCE; divorced)
- Parents: Publius Antistius (father); Calpurnia (mother)

Antistia (fl. 86 – c. 82 BCE) was a Roman woman and the first of the five wives of Gnaeus Pompeius, later known as Pompey the Great.

Little is known of Antistia outside her marriage to Pompey. She was promised to Pompey in marriage by her father, the lawyer, orator and senator Publius Antistius, in 86 BCE, while Antistius was presiding over the trial of Pompey for financial misconduct. In 82 or 81 BCE, Pompey divorced her in favour of Aemilia, the stepdaughter of Sulla, at the dictator's urging. The affair attracted criticism in Rome, and was used by Pompey's later political enemies to portray him as placing political self-interest over his familial duties.

The lack of secure historical information on Antistia's life freed later dramatists and writers to fictionalise her feelings and motives in her marriage, and to invent more elaborate endings to the story. Beginning with the French dramatist Pierre Corneille, who included her in his 1662 play Sertorius, Antistia has been presented as a cruelly-treated victim of Pompey's political ambition, whose love for her husband proved little obstacle to his own self-interest and the machinations of Sulla.

== Sources ==
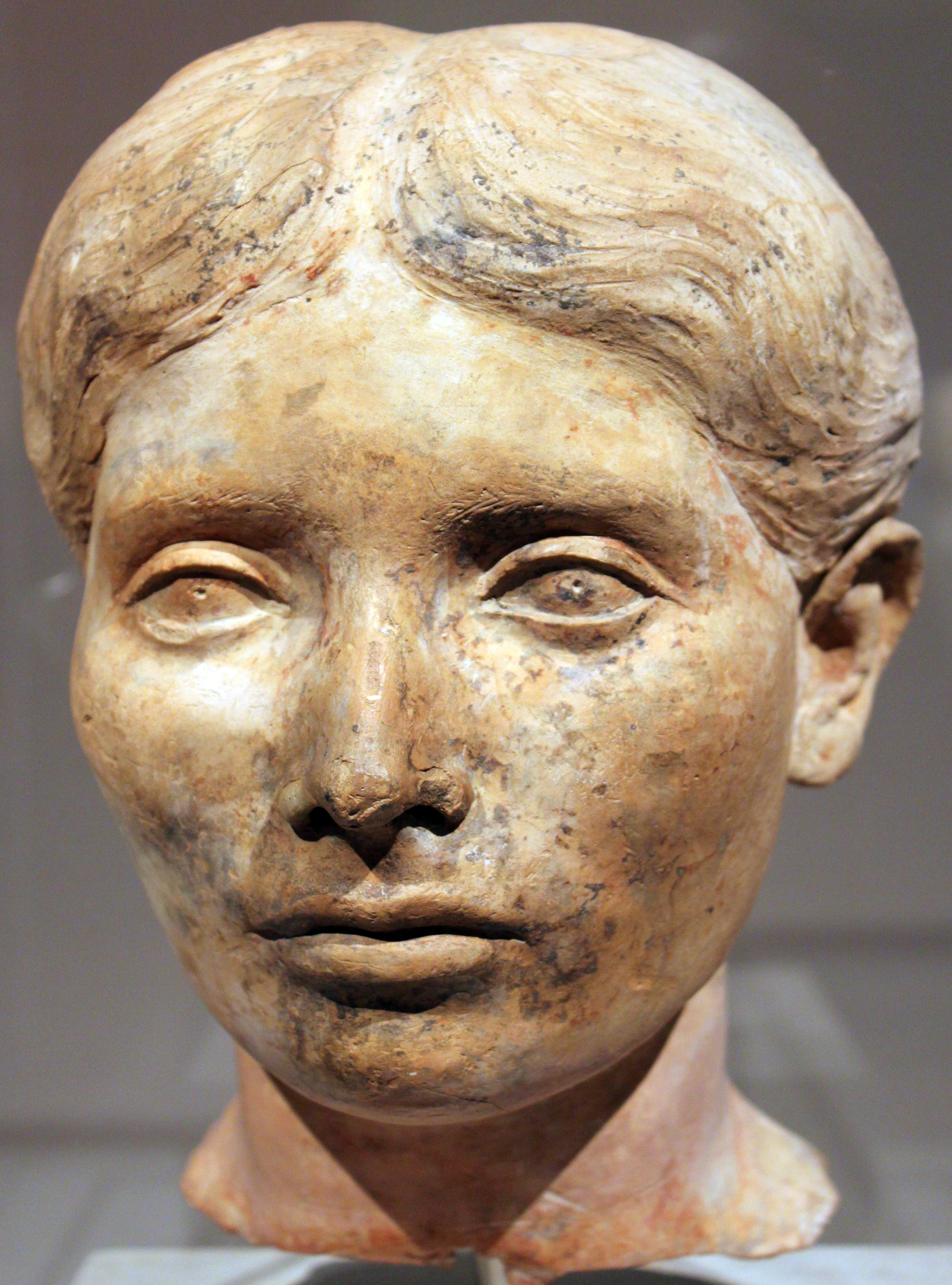
Roman portrait head of an unknown woman from c. 30 BCE. No portrait of Antistia survives from antiquity, but the style of this example is typical of female portraits of the 1st century BCE, which tend to be more idealised and conventionalised than those of men.

The only surviving source for Antistia's life and relationship with Pompey is Plutarch's Lives. The most complete account is found in his Life of Pompey, though he also included details of the divorce in the Life of Sulla. Plutarch was born c. 46 CE, approximately 130 years after the events he describes.

These accounts are known to be based on sources hostile to Pompey: in particular, the account of Antistia has been linked with Oppius, a Caesarian propagandist whose work Plutarch consulted while writing the Life of Pompey. The relevant sections of the Life of Pompey have been characterised as primarily concerned with making political points about Sulla's tyranny and presenting the affair through a tragic lens, with comparatively little regard for the facts of the story or its chronological accuracy. Keith Hopkins has suggested that the motives imputed by Plutarch to the various characters should be regarded as "suspect".

== Family ==
Antistia was a member of a relatively obscure plebeian family, the gens Antistia, which later gained patrician status in 29 BCE under Octavian. Her mother, Calpurnia, was likewise of plebeian ancestry, though her family (the gens Calpurnia) had attained the rank of nobiles by 180 BCE, when her ancestor Gaius Calpurnius Piso was consul. Calpurnia belonged to a relatively minor branch of the gens, the Calpurnii Bestiae: her father, Lucius Calpurnius Bestia, had been consul in 111 BCE but was prosecuted and condemned for corruption during the Jugurthine War.

Antistia's father, Publius Antistius, rose to prominence in the early 80s BCE, judged by Cicero as among the best of a poor crop of orators active at that time (c. 88 BCE). Having dominated politics in the previous years, Sulla was absent from Rome for much of the First Mithridatic War (89–85 BCE), allowing his enemies, Gaius Marius and then Cornelius Cinna, to gain political supremacy. Cicero described this as a time of lawlessness and corruption, and Antistius's prominence has been taken as evidence for his implication in the judicial irregularities of the period.

In 88 BCE, Antistius was elected tribune of the plebs. In this role, he gained prominence for his successful opposition to the candidacy of Gaius Julius Caesar Strabo for consul, on the grounds that Strabo had not previously held the necessary office of praetor. This brought Antistius greater public visibility and a reputation as a prosecutor; Cicero recalls that "every case of importance" was brought to him.

== Marriage to Pompey ==
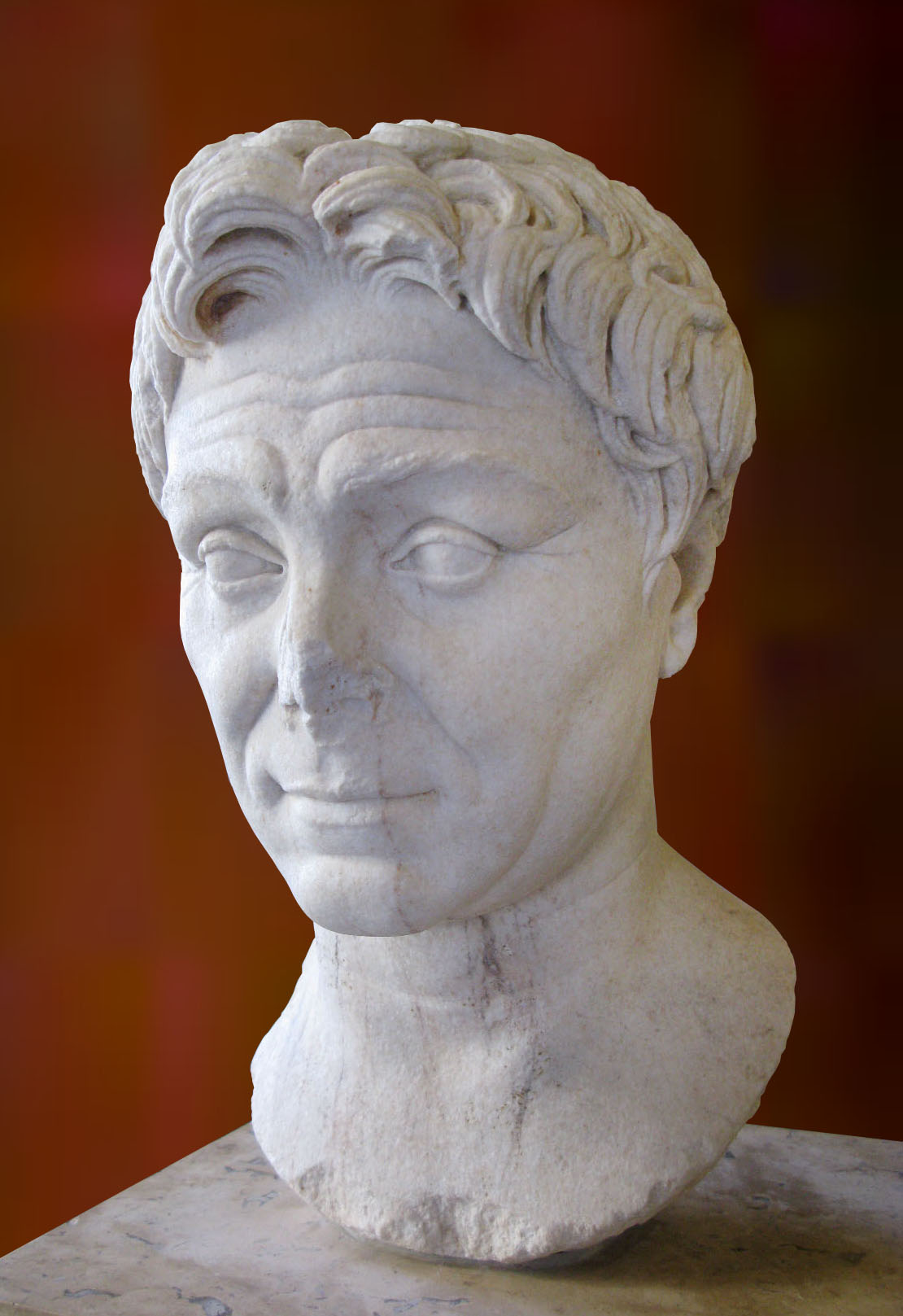
Marble bust of Pompey at the Louvre, Paris

Around 86 BCE, (Note: Most scholars consider Plutarch's statement that the trial occurred shortly after the death of Pompey's father in 87 BCE as evidence for a date in 86. Sumner, however, has argued that that Antistius must have first have been aedile to be able to preside over a court: as Antistius had not yet held this office by 86, he argues that he must have done so in 86–85 BCE and so that the trial must have taken place in 85. This argument has in turn been challenged by Hillman.) in his capacity as iudex, (Note: Antistius' precise rank is uncertain: Plutarch suggests that he was a praetor, but Velleius Paterculus states that Antistius' highest office before his death was that of aedile. Gruen considers Plutarch's statement a mistake.) Antistius presided over the trial of Pompey for embezzlement of public funds (peculatus) during the Social War. The trial has been largely characterised as a sham, with its outcome assured from the start. Antistius showed favour to Pompey throughout the trial, and secretly promised Antistia to him in marriage while the proceedings were still ongoing. This fact, however, became common knowledge: when Antistius announced the verdict of acquittal, Plutarch reports that the crowd began shouting Talasio!, the customary acclamation of a marriage.

Antistia's marriage to Pompey has thus been interpreted as "the most characteristic example of political marriage, and … the most pitiful and pathetic": as a cynically-minded attempt by Antistius to increase his standing through alliance to an up-and-coming young nobleman, and by Pompey as an equally-cynical attempt to avoid any chance of an adverse verdict, as well as to gain the favour and patronage of Antistius and his family. Erich Gruen has described it as the first of Pompey's marriages intended to give him "access to the inner citadels of senatorial power", though the alliance ultimately proved of little political value to him.

Pompey was around twenty years old at the time of the marriage. Antistia's age is not recorded; it was normal for Roman women to make their first marriage before the age of twenty, though aristocratic girls often married much younger, typically between the ages of twelve and fifteen. No children are known from the marriage, which is generally assumed to have been childless.

== Divorce ==
In 82 or 81 BCE, (Note: Most scholars date the divorce to 82 BCE, following Plutarch. Arthur Keaveney, however, argues for a date in 81 BCE, suggesting that it may have formed part of a deal to secure Pompey's first triumph, which was held no earlier than that year. (Note: On the date of that triumph, variously argued as 81, 80 or 79 BCE, see Badian 1955.) Hillman endorses the plausibility of this date, citing the chronological imprecision of the section of Plutarch on which the 82 BCE date depends.) Sulla and his wife Metella persuaded Pompey to divorce Antistia in favour of Sulla's stepdaughter, Aemilia. The reasons for the marriage are ambiguous, and perhaps mixed: Plutarch explains the marriage through Sulla's desire to reward Pompey for his successful service in the civil war against the Marians during 83–82, and to make a marriage alliance with a capable man who could be of use to him. However, the marriage has also been characterised as Sulla's attempt to neutralise the potential threat of Pompey's popularity and growing power. Pompey, for his own part, considered himself a 'Sullan' for the remainder of the dictator's life, and for at least a decade after Sulla's death in 78 BCE; maintaining his connection to Sulla was an important factor in his own marriage to Mucia Tertia in 79 BCE and that of his daughter Pompeia Magna to the dictator's son Faustus Cornelius Sulla.

The divorce was criticised in Roman society, and seems to have been painful for Pompey: (Note: Frédéric Blaive considers it, at least, a callous act on Sulla's part, which showed that 'the feelings of those he manipulated were of little importance to him'.) Plutarch writes that it 'befitted the needs of Sulla rather than the nature and habits of Pompey', in that Aemilia was already pregnant by her current husband, the future consul Manius Acilius Glabrio, and was soon to die giving birth to his son. The remark may also allude to Pompey's passionate nature and, perhaps, his attachment to Antistia. For Antistia, the divorce was part of a period of great misfortune: her father had been killed in 82 BCE by Marian supporters, the so-called Cinnani, during a senate-meeting at the Curia Hostilia. The murder was instigated by the praetor Junius Damasippus, who viewed Antistius as unreliable, despite his earlier co-operation, due to his marriage alliance with Pompey. Her mother, Calpurnia, had also killed herself upon hearing of the divorce, which Plutarch described as an "indignity". (Note: In the account of Velleius Paterculus, Calpurnia's suicide is a reaction to Antistius' murder: Velleius does not mention Antistia or the divorce at all.) The damage to Pompey's reputation caused by the divorce has been cited as a contributing factor towards his cultivation of an alliance with Marcus Aemilius Lepidus, the father of the future triumvir, in 79 BCE.

Little is known of Antistia's reaction to the divorce, or of her life afterwards. (Note: It has been claimed that Antistia also killed herself, but this has no basis in Classical sources, and would appear to be a misreading of Plutarch's comment on Calpurnia.) By Roman standards, the marriage was short: while approximately a third of known Roman marriages ended in divorce, they averaged around twenty-one years in duration, and most short marriages were ended by death. Both Plutarch and the modern scholar Thomas Hillman have described the marriage as a "Greek tragedy". (Note: Plutarch, Life of Pompey 9.4)

Antistia has been described as a "political victim", and the affair has taken as evidence of Roman women's lack of control over their marital lives, and the overarching importance of political concerns over personal in aristocratic Roman marriages. However, the parallels between Plutarch's account of Pompey's divorce from Antistia and his account of Caesar's refusal to divorce his own wife, Cornelia, when ordered to do so by Sulla (Note: Plutarch, Life of Caesar 1) have led to the suggestion that the framing of the narrative as found in Plutarch may originate in anti-Pompeian propaganda written by Caesar's supporters after the outbreak of civil war between the two in 49 BCE. Susan Jacobs has also situated Plutarch's narrative of Antistia's marriage and divorce in a tradition of "advice literature" to statesmen, and viewed Plutarch's portrayal of the affair as a warning of how marriage alliances could serve both as political tools and as reputational risks.

== Cultural depictions ==
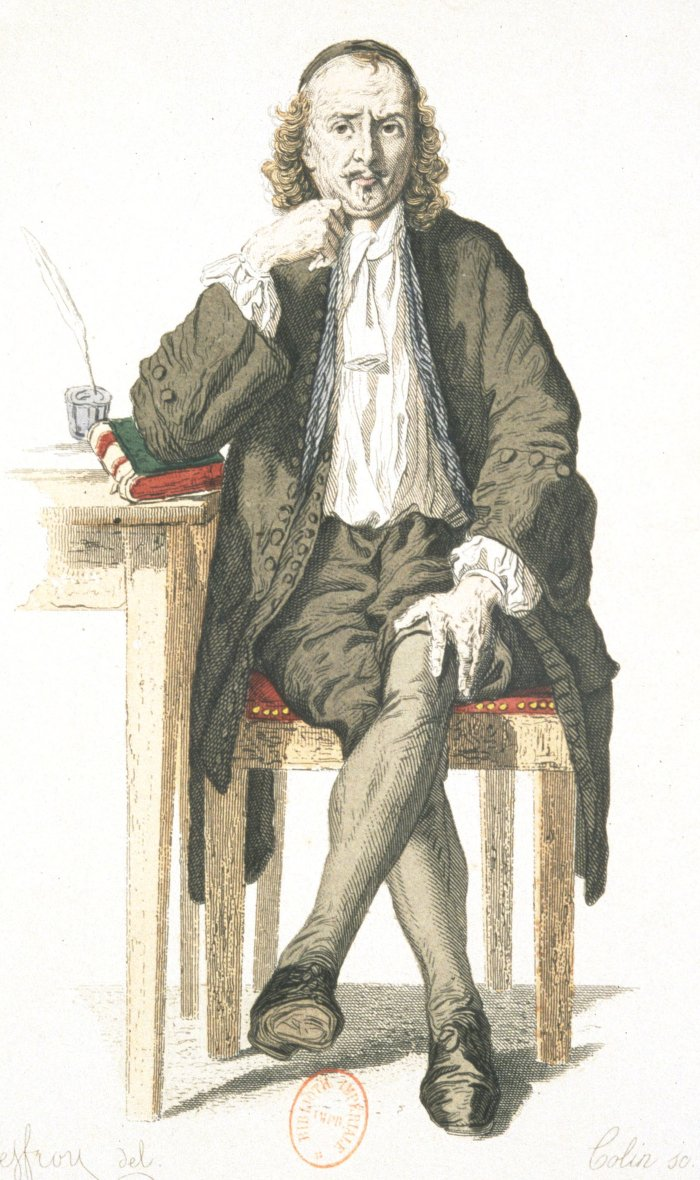
A seventeenth-century portrait of Pierre Corneille, who created a highly fictionalised portrayal of Antistia for his 1662 play Sertorius.

Antistia has been featured in several later works of fiction, which have often portrayed her as feeling genuine love for Pompey, and used her story to create a tension between Pompey's own love for her and his political interests.

Antistia is a character in the 1662 play Sertorius by Pierre Corneille. The play is primarily based on Plutarch's Life of Sertorius but draws on the Life of Pompey and the Life of Sulla for its material on Antistia. Corneille renames Antistia to "Aristie", a name first given to her by the early medieval chronicler John of Biclaro, on the grounds that the latter name was "sweeter to the ear". Corneille also created a fictionalised account of Antistia's life after her divorce from Pompey, in which she took refuge in Spain. Aristie is notable within the play as the only character motivated by love, despite the play's apparent focus on marriage and romantic relationships: her dialogue with Pompey in Act 3 has been described as the play's "only approach to passion". Pompey, similarly, is presented as having loved Aristie, but reluctantly divorced her in order to follow Sulla's commands, and so to maintain his favour and eventually succeed to his power. Aristie has been described as a 'feminine' counterpoint to the play's other major female character, the fictional warrior-queen Viriate, who rejects love and sees marriage as a purely strategic decision. The contemporary author and critic François Hédelin, abbé d'Aubignac, identified Aristie as the heroine of the play.

Antistia also appears in The Tragedy of Pompey the Great, a play by John Masefield first performed in 1910. As in Corneille's play, Antistia is portrayed as deeply loving Pompey; Masefield has her urge her husband to stay with her rather than departing for war. She represents the attractions of love and domestic life as opposed to Pompey's military duty, creating what Arthur E. DuBois characterises as a conflict between the "philosophy of beauty", represented by Antistia, and the "philosophy of work".

In the 1929 Latin-language play Filius Imperatoris (The General's Son), a fictionalised romance between Antistia and Pompey during the Social War becomes a minor plotline. Antistia, disobeying her father, goes for a walk unaccompanied around his villa, and ends up astray near the military camp of Gnaeus Pompeius Strabo, Pompey's father. There, she meets her future husband, who leads her home.

In Phyllis Bentley's 1936 novel Freedom, Farewell!, Pompey is depicted as loving Antistia and the suicide of her mother is the cause of Aemilia's death. Aemilia hears the news of Calpurnia's suicide during a wedding ceremony and is so upset for Antistia's pain that she suffers a seizure that results in a miscarriage and her own death.

== Bibliography ==
- Badian, Ernst (1955). "The Date of Pompey's First Triumph". Hermes. 83 (1): 107–118. JSTOR 4474880.
- Blaive, Frédéric (1988). "Sylla ou le Guerrier Impie inachevé". Latomus. 47 (4): 812–820. JSTOR 41535198.
- Broughton, Thomas Robert Shannon (1951). The Magistrates of the Roman Republic. Vol. 1. New York: American Philological Association.
- D'Ambra, Eve (2014). "Beauty and the Roman female portrait". In Elsner, Jaś; Meyer, Michel (eds.). Art and Rhetoric in Roman Culture. Cambridge University Press. pp. 155–180. doi:10.1017/CBO9780511732317. ISBN 9780511732317.
- Drumann, Wilhelm (1899). Paul Groebe (ed.). Geschichte Roms in seinem Uebergange von der republikanischen zur monarchischen Verfassung, oder: Pompeius, Caesar, Cicero und ihre Zeitgenossen (in German). Vol. 1 (2nd ed.). Berlin: Gebrüder Borntraeger.
- DuBois, Arthur E. (1930). "The Cult of Beauty: A Study of John Masefield". Publications of the Modern Language Association. 45 (4): 1218–1257. doi:10.2307/457838. JSTOR 457838. S2CID 163858884.
- Gorbulich, I.S. (2006). "Dynastic marriage as a political tool in the career of Pompey the Great" (PDF). Mnemon (in Russian). 5: 287–298. Archived from the original (PDF) on 2022-04-02.
- Gruen, Erich S. (1995) [1974]. The Last Generation of the Roman Republic. Berkeley: University of California Press. ISBN 0-520-20153-1.
- Gruen, Erich S. (1968). Roman Politics and the Criminal Courts, 149–78 B.C. Cambridge, MA, US: Harvard University Press. ISBN 0-674-28420-8.
- Haley, Shelley (1985). "The Five Wives of Pompey the Great". Greece and Rome. 32 (1): 49–59. doi:10.1017/S0017383500030138. JSTOR 642299. S2CID 154822339.
- Hallett, Judith P. (2014) [1984]. Fathers and Daughters in Roman Society: Women and the Elite Family. Princeton University Press. ISBN 9781400855322.
- Hejduk, Julia Dyson (2014). Clodia: A Sourcebook. Norman: University of Oklahoma Press. ISBN 9780806185736.
- Hillman, Thomas P. (1998). "Notes on the trial of Pompeius at Plutarch, Pomp. 4.1–6" (PDF). Rheinisches Museum für Philologie. 141 (2): 176–193. JSTOR 41234316.
- Hillman, Thomas P. (1997). "Pompeius in Africa and Sulla's Order to demobilize (Plutarch, Pompeius 13,1-4)". Latomus. 56 (1): 94–106. JSTOR 41537907.
- Hoberman, Ruth (1997). Gendering Classicism: The Ancient World in Twentieth-Century Women's Historical Fiction. SUNY Press. ISBN 9780791433355.
- Hollister, Horace Adelbert (1929). "Proceedings of the High School Conference of November 1910–November 1931". University of Illinois Bulletin.
- Hölkeskamp, Karl-Joachim (2014). "Under Roman Roofs: Family, House and Household". In Flower, Harriet I. (ed.). The Cambridge Companion to the Roman Republic (2nd ed.). Cambridge University Press. pp. 101–126. doi:10.1017/CCO9781139424783. ISBN 9781139424783.
- Hopkins, Keith (1985) [1983]. Death and Renewal: Volume 2: Sociological Studies in Roman History. Cambridge University Press. ISBN 9780521271172.
- Hughes, Sarah Shaver; Hughes, Brady (2015). Women in World History: Volume 1: Readings from Prehistory to 1500. New York: Taylor and Francis. ISBN 9781317451853.
- Jacobs, Susan G. (2017). Plutarch's Pragmatic Biographies: Lessons for Statesmen and Generals in the Parallel Lives. Leiden: Brill. ISBN 9789004276611.
- Kaster, Robert A. (2020). Cicero: Brutus and Orator. Oxford University Press. ISBN 978-0-19-085785-1.
- Katz, Barry R. (1977). "Caesar Strabo's struggle for the consulship – and more" (PDF). Rheinisches Museum für Philologie. 120 (1): 45–63. JSTOR 41244887.
- Keaveney, Arthur (1982). "The Young Pompey". Acta Classica. 52: 111–139.
- Lancaster, Henry Carrington (1966). A History of French Dramatic Literature in the Seventeenth Century: Volume 3: The Age of Molière: Part 2. New York: Gordian Press.
- Lightman, Marjorie; Lightman, Benjamin (2008). "Antistia (2)". A to Z of Ancient Greek and Roman Women. New York: Facts on File. p. 23. ISBN 9781438107943.
- Marshall, Bruce A. (1984). "Faustus Sulla and Political Labels in the 60's and 50's B.C". Historia: Zeitschrift für Alte Geschichte. 33 (2): 199–219. JSTOR 4435882.
- Paley, Frederick Apthorp; Mitchell, John Malcolm (1911). "Plutarch" . In Chisholm, Hugh (ed.). Encyclopædia Britannica. Vol. 21 (11th ed.). Cambridge University Press. pp. 857–860.
- Rosenblitt, Alison (2014). "The Turning Tide: The Politics of the Year 79 B.C.E". Transactions of the American Philological Association. 144 (2): 415–444. doi:10.1353/apa.2014.0008. JSTOR 43830445. S2CID 144556938.
- Shaw, Brent (2002). "With whom I lived: Measuring Roman marriage". Ancient Society. 32: 195–242. doi:10.2143/AS.32.0.59. JSTOR 44034960.
- Shaw, Brent (1987). "The Age of Roman Girls at Marriage: Some Reconsiderations". Journal of Roman Studies. 77: 30–46. doi:10.2307/300573. JSTOR 300573.
- Smith, William (1849). "Antistia Gens". Dictionary of Greek and Roman Biography and Mythology. Vol. 1. Boston: Little, Brown and Company. p. 209.
- Sumner, G.V. (1973). The Orators in Cicero's Brutus: Prosopography and Chronology. University of Toronto Press. ISBN 0-8020-5281-9.
- Thompson, Nancy (2007). Roman Art: A Resource for Educators. New York: Metropolitan Museum of Art. ISBN 9781588392220.
- Zmeskal, Klaus (2009). Adfinitas: die Verwandtschaften der senatorischen Führungsschicht der römischen Republik von 218-31 v. Chr (in German). Passau: Stutz.
