= Lucius Calpurnius Bestia (consul) =

Roman senator and general

Lucius Calpurnius Bestia was a Roman senator, tribune of the plebs in 121 BC, and consul in 111. Having been appointed to the command of the operations against Jugurtha, he at first carried on the campaign energetically, but soon, having been heavily bribed, concluded a disgraceful peace. On his return to Rome he was brought to trial for his conduct and condemned, in spite of the efforts of Marcus Aemilius Scaurus who, though formerly his legate and alleged to be equally guilty himself, was one of the judges - apparently Scaurus defended him extremely eloquently during the proceedings, but then turned round and voted to condemn him.

He may be the same man as, or the father of, the Bestia who encouraged the Italians in their revolt, and went into exile (90) to avoid punishment under the law of Quintus Varius Severus, whereby those who had secretly or openly aided the Italian allies against Rome were to be brought to trial. Both Cicero and Sallust express a high opinion of Bestia's abilities, but his love of money corrupted him. He is mentioned in a Carthaginian inscription as one of a board of three, perhaps an agricultural commission.

His daughter was Calpurnia (d. 82 BC), wife of Publius Antistius and mother of Antistia, Pompey's first wife. Calpurnia committed suicide in 82 BC, after her husband's murder and her daughter's divorce.
