= Battle near Osca =

Battle in the Roman Republic

Battle of Osca
- Part of the Sertorian War
Date	73/72 BC
Location	Osca
Result	Decisive Senatorial victory

Belligerents
Sertorian rebels	Senate of Rome

Commanders and leaders
Perperna	Pompey

Strength
Unknown	Six legions plus auxiliaries and allies

Casualties and losses
Entire army routed	Unknown

The Battle of Osca took place near Osca, northeastern Spain, between the armies of the Roman Senate and the remnants of the Sertorian rebels. The battle occurred ten days after the death of the rebel leader Sertorius.

Perperna, Sertorius's second-in-command, had murdered (assassinated) Sertorius, the leader of the rebellion, and had taken command of the Sertorian army. Pompey, the commander of the Roman legions in Hispania Citerior, upon hearing of Sertorius's death, marched his army directly to Osca, Sertorius's capital. Perperna, who needed a victory to cement his position as the new leader of the rebellion, marched his army out of Osca and took the field.

Perperna's army came across ten of Pompey's cohorts – a force of 2,500–5,000 men (Note: Roman units were rarely at full strength, and Pompey's army had been campaigning for years at that point.) – and attacked. The Pompeian force broke and retreated, drawing Perperna's army after them. It turned out to be a feigned retreat because they lured the rebels into an ambuscade. Perperna soon found his army surrounded on three sides, and the ten cohorts wheeled round and attacked him in the front while the rest of the Pompeian army attacked the flanks. The rebel army broke and fled while being pursued by the Romans. The final battle of the Sertorian War was over.

Perperna attempted to plead for his life, offering to give Pompey all of Sertorius's correspondence, which would document contacts with the highest levels of Roman government and society. Pompey indicated he would accept the papers, and when they had all been gathered together, he burned them, averting the possibility of another civil war. Perperna and all of the men who had murdered Sertorius were executed and Pompey spent the rest of the campaigning season mopping up the remaining rebel forces and taking their stronghold.

== Sources ==
- Matyszak, Philip (2013). Sertorius and the Struggle for Spain. Barnsley, South Yorkshire: Pen and Sword Books Ltd. ISBN 978-1-84884-787-3.
- Leach, John (1978). Pompey the Great. London: Croom Helm Ltd. ISBN 978-0-84766-035-3.
