= Robin Seager =

English historian of Ancient Rome

Robin Seager is an English historian. He is an honorary senior research fellow at the School of Archaeology, Classics and Egyptology at the University of Liverpool, UK.

Seager was a reader in classics and ancient history at the University of Liverpool. He has previously lectured at the University of Illinois at Urbana-Champaign and was a visiting research fellow at the University of New England, Armidale and Langford Eminent Scholar Chair at Florida State University, US.

== Works ==
- Tiberius (1972)
- Ammianus Marcellinus: Seven Studies in His Language and Thought (1986)
- Pompey: a Political Biography (1994)
