= Publius Antistius =

Roman orator and senator

- Born: c. 124 BC
- Died: 82 BC (aged c. 41-42); Senate house, Rome
- Resting place: Corpse thrown into the Tiber river
- Occupations: Politician and orator
- Office: Tribune of the plebs (88 BC); Aedile
- Spouse: Calpurnia
- Children: Antistia

Publius Antistius (c. 124 BC – 82 BC) was a Roman orator and senator. As tribune of the plebs in 88 BC, he rose from poorly regarded obscurity to prominence by delivering an exceptionally good speech in opposition to the irregular candidacy of a prominent senator to the consulship. In 86 BC, Antistius presided over a sham court which acquitted Pompey of a charge of embezzlement, and afterwards married his daughter to him. He adopted a careful political stance during the civil wars of the 80s BC, but was murdered by partisans of Marius at a senate meeting for suspected sympathy to the opposing faction of Sulla.

== Biography ==
Publius Antistius belonged to a generation of Roman orators whose members were all born around 124 BC and flourished during Cicero's youth. A seemingly modest speaker, he started out his public career inauspiciously, spending many years in poorly-regarded obscurity. In 88 BC, Antistius was tribune of the plebs, in which capacity he successfully opposed the irregular candidacy of a senator, Gaius Julius Caesar Strabo, to the office of consul. He is said to have argued his case exceptionally well, speaking "at greater length and with greater penetration" than a renowned orator, Publius Sulpicius, a fellow tribune who spoke on the same side of the debate as him. Antistius's distinguished presentation on the occasion brought him to public acclaim for the first time, and he became a highly sought-after court advocate in the years following; soon, all the important court cases were brought to him. The contemporary Cicero considered him one of the best orators active at the time, though he attributed his success partly to a lack of worthy competition. In his dialogue Brutus (227), Cicero described Antistius's style of oratory as follows:

He sharply analyzed the issue, assembled his argument carefully, and had a powerful memory; his diction was neither elaborate nor commonplace; his agile speech ran along very easily, and he had a certain tone that was not unpolished; his delivery, however, was slightly impaired both by a vocal defect and silly mannerisms.

The career of Antistius peaked between the civil wars of 87 and 83 BC, when the general Sulla was away from Italy and Sulla's enemies, Gaius Marius and then Cornelius Cinna, dominated politics in Rome. Cicero described this as a time when law and dignity were lacking, and Antistius's prominence in the courts would seem to implicate him in the judicial irregularities of the period. In 86 BC, Antistius presided over a court which tried Pompey (the future triumvir) for embezzlement of public funds (peculatus) during the Social War. (Note: The trial is dated to 86 BC based on the statement by Plutarch that it occurred shortly after the death of Pompey's father in 87. Hillman rejected the argument of Sumner that Antistius must have first have been aedile to be able to preside over a court, and that the trial should thus be dated to 85 to allow for an aedileship the previous year.) The trial was "deliberately planned and contrived from the outset". Throughout the hearing, Antistius (Note: Plutarch seems to describe Antistius as a praetor, but this conflicts with a statement by Velleius Paterculus that he had the rank of aedile when he died. Rather than assume there were two people named Antistius in question, it is believed that Plutarch simply made a mistake when reporting his rank.) displayed conspicuous favor to the defendant, and secretly betrothed his own daughter, Antistia, to him behind the scenes. Several leading aristocrats connected to Cinna's regime came to defend Pompey in court. Pompey married Antistia immediately after being acquitted, leading many to suspect judicial corruption from conflict of interest. The whole affair has been variously interpreted, on the government's point of view, as a genuine attempt to prosecute a crime, a scheme to fill up the Roman treasury, a begrudging acquittal of a potential political opponent, or simply a state-managed farce. For Antistius in particular, it gave him the opportunity to form a connection with a prominent and promising young aristocrat.

Generally, Antistius seems to have cooperated cautiously with the Marian and Cinnan regime during the peaceful years 86–83 BC, holding at some point the office of aedile but going no further up the cursus honorum. However, when the civil war between Sulla and the Marians began in 83, Pompey joined the former, which turned his father-in-law, Antistius, into a natural target of suspicion from the government. The Marians did not take any chances: in 82, the praetor Junius Damasippus arranged for Antistius and other unreliable senators to be murdered at the Curia Hostilia during a senate meeting (according to Appian, Antistius specifically was killed while still in his seat); their corpses were all thrown into the Tiber river. Upon hearing of the act, the wife of Antistius, Calpurnia, daughter of Lucius Bestia (consul in 111 BC), committed suicide. Pompey later ignominiously divorced their daughter, Antistia, at Sulla's instigation.

Describing the overall life and career of Antistius, Bulst wrote that he seems "typical for the majority of the senate", for whom "no strong political attachment seems to exist". His collaboration with the tribune Sulpicius against Caesar Strabo in 88 BC may indicate that he sympathized with the cause of Sulpicius and his ally, Gaius Marius, during the events that led to Sulla's march on Rome that year. Barry Katz suggested that, since Strabo was Marius's enemy, Antistius may have simply been in Marius's employ, or perhaps even received the talking points against Strabo from Marius himself. One author also speculated that Antistius had been the one to introduce Marius to Sulpicius. Antistius did indeed collaborate, if only cautiously, with the Marians during the 80s BC, but not enough to save him from being suspected and disposed of during a time of crisis. On the other hand, Sulla also felt no attachment to him, and saw no problem in prompting his supporter, Pompey, divorce the dead man's daughter to suit his own interests. In the end, by not fully committing himself to either side, Antistius became valued or trusted by neither. "He may have over-calculated the risks and prospects at each stage".
