= Pompeia Magna =

Roman woman, daughter of Pompey

Pompeia Magna (born 80/75 BC – before 35 BC) was the daughter and second child born to Roman triumvir Pompey the Great (Gnaeus Pompeius Magnus) from his third marriage, to Mucia Tertia. Her elder brother was Gnaeus Pompeius and her younger brother was Sextus Pompey.

== Biography ==
Pompeia was born and raised in Rome. In 59 BC, her father Pompey married for a fourth time, to Julia, the daughter of Julius Caesar. After their marriage, Pompeia was betrothed to a Servilius Caepio, but she instead married Faustus Cornelius Sulla, a politician who was the son of Roman dictator Lucius Cornelius Sulla from his wife Caecilia Metella. Around 47 BC, Faustus died in the African War against Julius Caesar. Their two sons fell into the hands of Caesar, however he dismissed them as a danger and pardoned them.

After 46 BC, Pompeia married for a second time to politician Lucius Cornelius Cinna who was consul in 32 BC.

For a time, Pompeia accompanied her younger brother Sextus Pompey to Sicily. It was in Sicily that Pompeia made various presents for the young future emperor, Tiberius, who had fled with his parents there from Octavian. Pompeia gave Tiberius such presents as a cloak, a brooch, and a gold bulla. The historian Suetonius states that these presents were preserved and were exhibited in Baiae in his time. Sextus Pompey survived Pompeia when she died, sometime before 35 BC.

== Children ==
- First marriage to Faustus Cornelius Sulla:
  - Faustus Cornelius Sulla
  - Possibly a daughter who married Quintus Aemilius Lepidus
- Second marriage to politician Lucius Cornelius Cinna:
  - Gnaeus Cornelius Cinna Magnus, consul in 5 AD
  - Magna, who possibly married a Lucius Scribonius Libo

== Sources ==
- Suetonius – The Lives of the Twelve Caesars – Tiberius
- Microsoft Encarta Encyclopaedia 2002
