= Sertorius (Corneille play) =

Mid-17th Century French Theatre Play

Sertorius is a play by Pierre Corneille on the revolt by Quintus Sertorius, created for the Théâtre du Marais of Paris for 25 February 1662, afterwards published in July of the same year. The literary scholar George Saintsbury considered Sertorius to be "one of Corneille’s finest plays", and declared that "the characters of Aristie, Viriate and Sertorius himself [...] are not to be surpassed in grandeur of thought, felicity of design or appropriateness of language".

== Quotation ==
«On a peine à haïr ce qu'on a bien aimé
Et le feu mal éteint est bientôt rallumé.»

“It is hard to hate what once has been well loved
And a passion ill snuffed out can readily be rekindled.”
(Act I, scene 3)
