= Pompey =

Roman general and statesman (106–48 BC)

- Gnaeus Pompeius Magnus
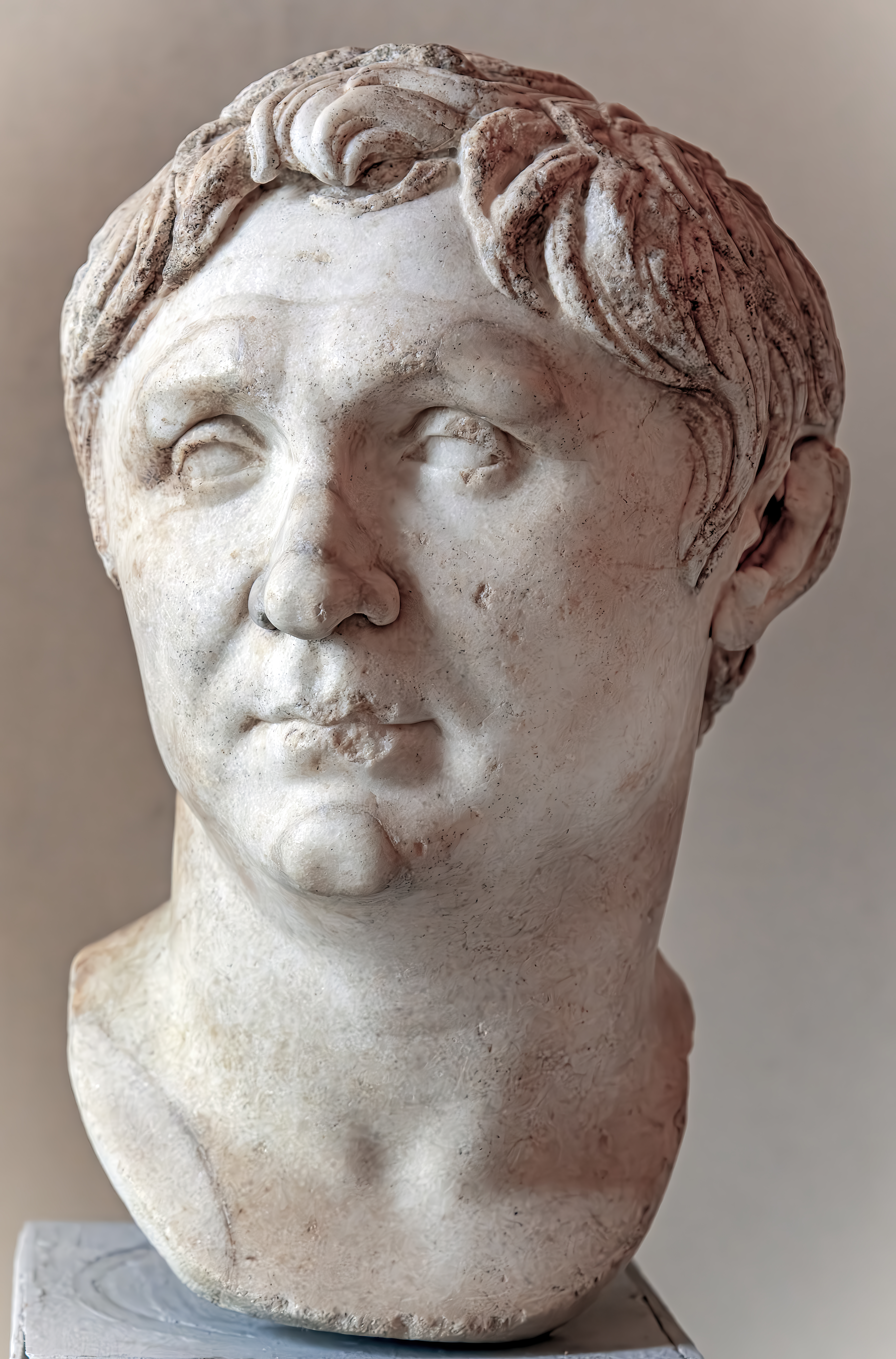
- Bust of Pompey, copy of an original from 70–60 BC, Venice National Archaeological Museum
- Born: 29 September 106 BC; Picenum, Italy
- Died: 28 September 48 BC (aged 57); Pelusium, Egypt
- Cause of death: Assassination
- Resting place: Albanum, Italy
- Occupations: Soldier; politician
- Office: Consul (70, 55, 52 BC)
- Spouses: Antistia (86–82 BC, divorced); Aemilia (82 BC, her death); Mucia Tertia (79–61 BC, divorced); Julia (59–54 BC, her death); Cornelia Metella (52–48 BC, his death)
- Children: Gnaeus; Pompeia; Sextus
- Father: Gnaeus Pompeius Strabo
- Relatives: Pompeia gens
- Military career
- Conflicts: Social War; Sulla's civil war; Battle of the Asio River; Battle of Utica; Sertorian War; Battle of Lauron; Battle of Valentia; Battle of Sucro; Battle of Saguntum; Battle near Osca; Third Servile War; Campaign against the pirates; Battle of Korakesion; Hasmonean civil war; Siege of Jerusalem; Third Mithridatic War; Battle of the Lycus; Battle of the Pelorus; Battle of the Abas; Caesar's civil war; Siege of Brundisium; Battle of Dyrrhachium; Battle of Pharsalus
- Awards: 3 Triumphs

Gnaeus Pompeius Magnus (Latin: [ˈŋnae̯.ʊs pomˈpejʊs ˈmaŋnʊs]; 29 September 106 BC – 28 September 48 BC), known in English as Pompey (/ˈpɒmpi/ POM-pee) or Pompey the Great, was a Roman general and statesman who was prominent in the final decades of the Roman Republic. As a young man, he was a partisan and protégé of the dictator Sulla, after whose death he achieved significant military and political success.

A member of the senatorial nobility, Pompey entered into a military career at an early age. He rose to prominence serving Sulla as a commander during the civil war of 83–81 BC. His early success as a general allowed him to bypass the traditional cursus honorum (the sequence of public offices required for political advancement), and he was elected as consul on three occasions (70, 55, 52 BC). He celebrated three triumphs and served as a commander in the Sertorian War, the Third Servile War, the Third Mithridatic War, and in various other military campaigns. Pompey's early success led dictator Sulla to grant him the cognomen Magnus – "the Great" – reportedly in reference to Pompey's admiration for Alexander the Great. His adversaries, however, referred to him as adulescentulus carnifex ("teenage butcher") due to his perceived ruthlessness.

In 60 BC, Pompey joined Crassus and Caesar in the informal political alliance known as the First Triumvirate, cemented by Pompey's marriage to Caesar's daughter, Julia. After the deaths of Julia and Crassus (in 54 and 53 BC), Pompey aligned himself with the optimates—a conservative faction of the Roman Senate. Pompey and Caesar subsequently came into conflict over control of the Roman state, which led to Caesar's civil war. Pompey was defeated at the Battle of Pharsalus in 48 BC, and he sought refuge in Ptolemaic Egypt, where he was assassinated by the courtiers of Ptolemy XIII.

== Early life and career ==
Gnaeus Pompeius Magnus was born in Picenum on 29 September 106 BC, the eldest son of a provincial noble called Gnaeus Pompeius Strabo. Although from the dominant family in Picenum, Strabo was the first of his branch to achieve senatorial status in Rome; he completed the traditional cursus honorum, becoming consul in 89 BC, and acquired a reputation for greed, political duplicity, and military ruthlessness. Pompey began his career serving with his father in the Social War (91–87 BC).

Strabo died in 87 BC during the short-lived civil war known as the Bellum Octavianum, although sources differ on whether he succumbed to disease or was murdered by his own soldiers. Before his death, Strabo was accused of embezzlement; as his legal heir, Pompey was held responsible for the alleged crime and put on trial. He was acquitted, supposedly after agreeing to marry the judge's daughter, Antistia.

One of the main issues at stake in 87 BC was the appointment of the consul Sulla as commander of the Roman army in the ongoing First Mithridatic War, an opportunity to amass enormous wealth. During his absence in the East, his political rivals led by Lucius Cornelius Cinna, Gnaeus Papirius Carbo and Gaius Marius the Younger regained control of the Roman Senate. Sulla's return in 83 BC sparked a civil war within the Roman world.

== Pompey during Sulla's civil war ==
In the year before Sulla's return, Pompey had raised and equipped a full legion from among his father's old clients and veterans in Picenum. In the spring of 83, Sulla landed in Brundisium. As he marched north-west towards Campania, Pompey led his own legion south to join him. The government in Rome sent out three separate armies in an attempt to prevent the union between Pompey's and Sulla's armies. Pompey attacked one of these armies and routed it. The three enemy commanders, unable to agree on a course of action, withdrew. Soon after Pompey arrived at Sulla's camp. He was greeted by Sulla with the title imperator ("commander", an honorific normally awarded by troops that had been led to victory).

At some point in 83 BC, it is not clear when, but definitely before the onset of winter, Sulla sent Pompey back to Picenum to raise more troops. When fighting broke out once more in 82, Sulla advanced towards Rome, while Metellus (one of his lieutenants), supported by Pompey, campaigned against the consul Gaius Papirius Carbo in Cisalpine Gaul. During this campaign Pompey acted as Metellus's cavalry commander.

Metellus and Pompey defeated Carbo's lieutenant, the praetor Gaius Carrinas, in a six-hour battle at the river Aesis, only to be blockaded by Carbo himself. When word of Sulla's victory at the Battle of Sacriportus reached them, Carbo retreated to his base at Ariminium, severely harassed by Pompey's cavalry. Some time later, Metellus defeated Gaius Marcius Censorinus, another of Carbo's lieutenants. Pompey's cavalry caught Censorinus's fleeing troops outside their base at Sena Gallica, defeating them and plundering the town. While Metellus remained in the north-west, Pompey seems to have transferred to Sulla's command in the south.

Pompey advanced south-west along the Via Flaminia towards Spoletium, where he joined Marcus Licinius Crassus; together they defeated Carrinas once again. Pompey laid siege to Carrinas in Spoletium, but the latter managed to escape. Pompey resumed his march to join Sulla's command. Not long afterwards, Pompey successfully ambushed another large force under Censorinus, which was trying to get through to Praeneste where Carbo's consular colleague, Marius the Younger (who was the figurehead of the struggle against Sulla), was blockaded. It was the failure of these attempts to get through the Sullan blockade in Umbria and Etruria, added to Metellus's success in winning control of the north, which broke the back of the government's resistance.

At the end of the campaigning season of 82, the government forces made one final effort to march to the relief of Praeneste. They mustered 10,000 legionaries and marched to join forces with the Samnites and the Lucanians, fierce enemies of Sulla, who had campaigned against them in the Social War. (Note: Samnium and Lucania had remained virtually neutral during the war, but now decided to throw their lot in with the Roman government – their hatred for Sulla probably being the deciding factor.) Pursued by Pompey, they united their forces and made for Praeneste. Unable to break through Sulla's blockade, they marched for undefended Rome, only to be caught just in time and defeated by Sulla at the Battle of the Colline Gate. Pompey, who was pursuing the government forces, arrived just after the battle.

By the end of 82 BC, Sulla had expelled his opponents from Italy and had himself made dictator by passage of an enabling law, the lex Valeria. Either through admiration of his abilities, or concern at his ambition, Sulla sought to consolidate his alliance with Pompey by persuading him to divorce Antistia, and marry his stepdaughter Aemilia. Plutarch claims she was already pregnant by her former husband, and died in childbirth soon after.

== Sicily, Africa and Lepidus' rebellion ==
The surviving Marians escaped to Sicily, where their ally Marcus Perperna was propraetor. They were supported by a fleet under Carbo, while Gnaeus Domitius Ahenobarbus occupied the Roman province of Africa. Perperna abandoned Sicily after Pompey landed on the island with a large force, (Note: Six legions and a navy of 120 warships and 800 transport ships. Both men and ships were immediately available: the men and ships from Sulla's armies) while Carbo was captured and later executed. Pompey claimed this was justified by Carbo's alleged crimes against Roman citizens, but his opponents nicknamed him adulescentulus carnifex, or "young butcher", as a result.

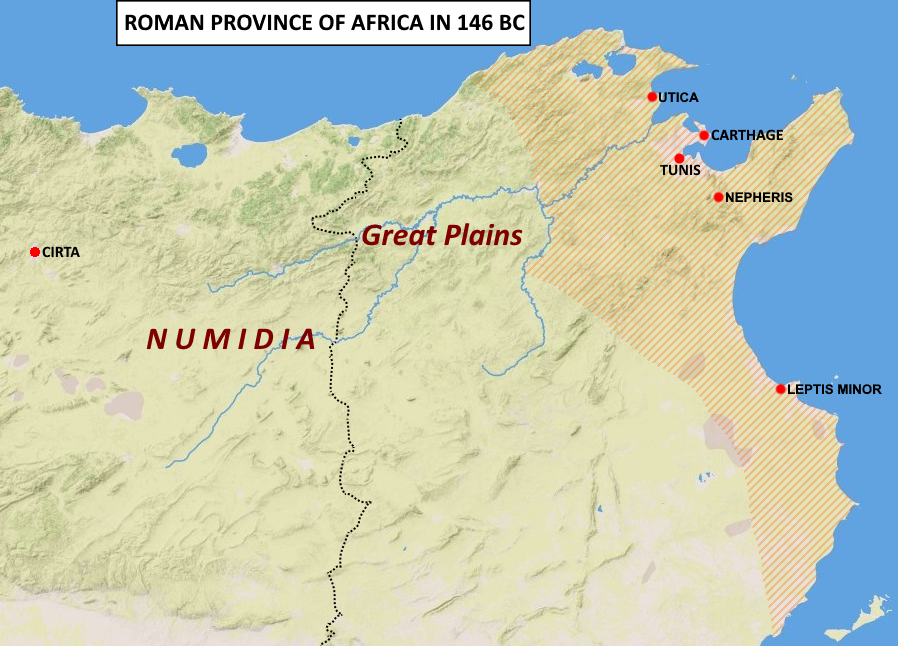
Roman Province of Africa

Pompey now sailed for Africa, leaving Sicily in the hands of his brother-in-law, Gaius Memmius. After defeating and killing Ahenobarbus at the Battle of Utica, Pompey subdued Numidia and executed its king Hiarbas, a Marian ally. He restored the deposed Hiempsal to the Numidian throne. Around this time, his troops began referring to him as Magnus, or "the Great", after Alexander the Great, a figure much admired by the Romans. Shortly thereafter, Pompey formally made this part of his cognomen.

On returning to Rome, he asked for a triumph to celebrate his victories, an unprecedented demand for someone so young. Pompey refused to disband his army until Sulla agreed, although the latter tried to offset the impact by awarding simultaneous triumphs to Lucius Licinius Murena and Gaius Valerius Flaccus. Sometime during this period, Pompey married Mucia Tertia, a member of the powerful Metellus family. They had three children before their divorce in 61 BC; Pompey the younger, usually known as Gnaeus, a daughter, Pompeia Magna, and a younger son, Sextus.

The Lepidan rebellion; key locations

Pompey supported Marcus Aemilius Lepidus as consul for 78 BC; Plutarch claims he did so against Sulla's advice, but some modern historians reject the idea. When Sulla died in 78 BC, Lepidus sought to block his state funeral and roll back some of Sulla's laws, then became proconsul of Cisalpine and Transalpine Gaul in January 77 BC. When the Senate ordered him back to Rome, Lepidus refused to comply unless granted another term as consul, a proposal that was rapidly rejected. Assembling an army, he began marching on Rome; the Senate responded with a series of measures, one of which was to appoint Pompey to a military command.

While Lepidus continued south, Pompey raised troops from among his veterans in Picenum and moved north to besiege Mutina, capital of Cisalpine Gaul. The town was held by Lepidus' ally Marcus Junius Brutus, who surrendered after a lengthy siege, and was assassinated the next day, allegedly on Pompey's orders. Catulus then defeated Lepidus outside Rome, while Pompey marched against his rear, catching him near Cosa. Lepidus and the remnants of his army retreated to Sardinia, where he died.

== Sertorian War ==
The Sertorian War began in 80 BC when Quintus Sertorius, a prominent proscribed Marian general, initiated a rebellion in Hispania, where he was joined by other Roman exiles like Perperna. Supported by local Iberian tribes, he took control of Hispania Ulterior and repeatedly defeated Quintus Caecilius Metellus Pius through skillful use of guerrilla warfare. Sertorius defeated other Roman generals sent to oust him and soon conquered Hispania Citerior as well. Backed by his allies in the Senate, Pompey was appointed military commander in Spain with proconsular authority in order to defeat Sertorius. This act was technically illegal as he had yet to hold public office, illustrating Pompey's preference for military glory and disregard for traditional political constraints.

Pompey recruited 30,000 infantry and 1,000 cavalry, evidence of the threat posed by Sertorius. En route to Hispania, he subdued a rebellion in Gallia Narbonensis, after which his army entered winter quarters near Narbo Martius. In early 76 BC, he crossed the Col de Portet and entered the Iberian peninsula, where he would remain for the next five years. His arrival boosted the morale of Metellus' troops, while some rebels changed sides, but soon after, he was defeated by Sertorius at the Battle of Lauron, losing one third of his army while inflicting next to no losses on Sertorius' army. This was a serious blow to Pompey's prestige, who spent the rest of the year reorganising his army. Metellus' failure to dislodge Sertorius and Pompey's defeat meant the senatorial generals made no progress in the year.

Sertorian War in Spain; key locations mentioned in article

In 75 BC, Sertorius led the campaign against Metellus, while Pompey defeated his subordinates Perperna and Gaius Herennius outside Valencia. When Sertorius took over operations against Pompey, Metellus defeated his deputy Lucius Hirtuleius at the Battle of Italica. Pompey faced Sertorius in the indecisive Battle of Sucro, in which Sertorius defeated Pompey's right flank and nearly captured Pompey himself, but his legate Lucius Afranius defeated the Sertorian right. Sertorius withdrew inland, then turned to fight at Saguntum, where Pompey lost 6,000 men, including his brother-in-law Memmius, reputedly his most effective subordinate. Sertorius himself suffered 3,000 casualties, one of whom was Hirtuleius.

Although Metellus defeated Perperna in a separate battle, Sertorius was able to withdraw to Clunia late in the year, where he repaired the walls to lure his opponents into a siege, while forming garrisons from other towns into a new field army. Once this was ready, he escaped from Clunia and used it to disrupt Roman logistics on land and by sea. Lack of supplies forced Metellus to quarter his troops in Gaul, while Pompey wintered among the Vaccaei. Dire straits caused by this stretch of the campaign and Sertorius' guerrilla warfare led Pompey to write a letter to the Senate asking for funds and men, and scolding their lack of support for him and Metellus.

Pompey's letter had the effect of galvanizing the Senate into sending him more men and funds. Reinforced by two more legions, in 74 BC he and Metellus began a war of attrition against their enemy. As his chief opponent had lost most of his Roman legionaries and could no longer match him in the field, Pompey, along with Metellus, gained the upper hand, conquering more and more Sertorian cities, slowly grinding down Sertorius' revolt. By now, Sertorius was being undermined by internal divisions. Discontent in Sertorius' coalition of Iberian and Roman forces came to a head in 72 or 73 BC when Perperna, leading a conspiracy with other prominent Sertorians, had Sertorius assassinated and assumed control of the rebel army.

Pompey engaged Perperna in battle and defeated him swiftly at the Battle near Osca. Perperna was captured and attempted to persuade Pompey to spare him by giving over Sertorius' correspondence, allegedly containing proof of communications between the rebel leader and leading men in Rome. Pompey burned the letters unread and executed Perperna, and then spent some time restructuring the local Roman administration, showing a lack of animosity towards his former opponents, which extended his patronage throughout Hispania and into southern Gaul. Pompey and his army remained in Hispania for a few years, conquering the Sertorian remnants, and then marched back to Rome.

== First consulship ==
During Pompey's absence, Marcus Licinius Crassus was charged with suppressing the slave rebellion led by Spartacus known as the Third Servile War. Pompey returned to Italy just before Crassus defeated the main rebel army in 71 BC, arriving in time to massacre 6,000 fugitives from the battle. His claim to have ended the war by doing so was a long-standing source of resentment for Crassus.

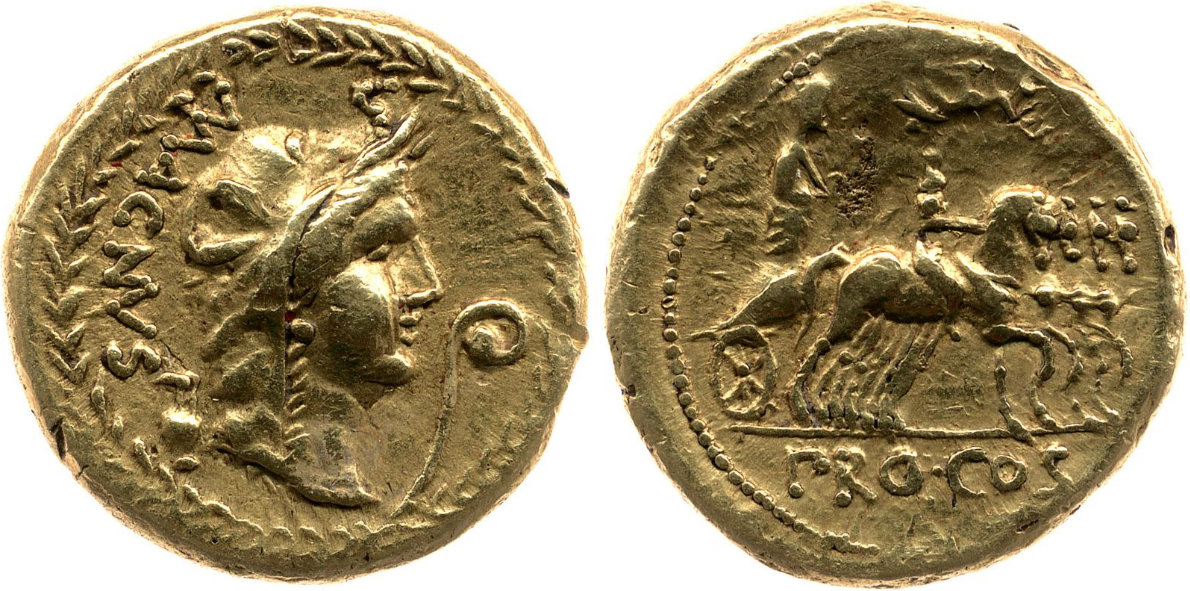
Aureus minted by Pompey for his second triumph in 71 BC, featuring the head of Africa on the obverse (celebrating his victory against Hiarbas). The reverse shows Pompey in his triumphal chariot, with his son Gnaeus seated before and Victory flying above.

Pompey was granted a second triumph for his victory in Hispania and also stood for the consulship. Since he was both too young and technically ineligible according to the minimum ages for offices set in place by Sulla in the Lex Cornelia Annalis, this required a special senatorial decree. Plutarch suggests Pompey supported Crassus as his co-consul to put him under an obligation. The two men were elected consuls for 70 BC, but allegedly differed on almost every measure, rendering their term "politically barren and without achievement".

However, their consulship did see the plebeian tribune recover powers removed by Sulla. One of the most significant was the ability to veto Senatorial bills, an act often seen as a turning point in the politics of the late Republic. Although popular with the people, the measure must have been opposed by the optimates, and thus passing it required support from both consuls, although most extant sources barely mention Crassus.

== Campaign against the pirates ==
Pirates operated throughout the Mediterranean, while their fleets often formed temporary alliances with enemies of Rome, including Sertorius and Mithridates. Their power and range had increased over the past fifty years, partly because of the decline of traditional naval powers like Rhodes, while previous attempts to subdue them had been unsuccessful. However, Romans routinely referred to their opponents as "pirates" or "brigands", and some historians argue it is more accurate to see them as a conventional enemy, rather than disorganised outlaws.

Principally based in Cilicia, in 68 BC, they raided as far as Ostia, Rome's port, and kidnapped two senators, to general outrage. Prompted by Pompey, Aulus Gabinius, tribune of the plebs in 67 BC, proposed the Lex Gabinia de piratis persequendis, giving him a mandate for their suppression. It granted him proconsular authority for three years in any province within 50 miles of the Mediterranean, along with the power to appoint legates and significant financial resources. Concerned by one man holding such wide-ranging powers, the Senate opposed the law, but it was passed by the people. Most of the difficulties Pompey faced came from officials who resented his authority. In Gaul, Piso hampered his recruitment efforts, while in Crete, Quintus Metellus refused to comply with his instructions.

Pompey spread his forces throughout the Mediterranean to prevent the pirates from escaping a Roman fleet by moving elsewhere. Fifteen legates were given specific areas to patrol, while he secured the grain route to Rome. These measures won him control of the western Mediterranean in just 40 days, after which his fleets moved to the east, forcing the pirates back to their bases in Cilicia. Pompey led the decisive assault on their stronghold in Coracaesium, winning the Battle of Korakesion and concluding the war in only three months.

Most of his opponents surrendered without fighting, thanks to Pompey's reputation for clemency. They were granted lands in cities devastated during the Mithridatic War, notably Soli, renamed Pompeiopolis, and Dyme in Greece, with others sent to towns in Libya and Calabria. These communities retained a strong attachment to both Rome and Pompey.

== Third Mithridatic War and re-organisation of the east ==
=== Third Mithridatic War ===
Asia Minor and surrounding region, first century BC

In 73 BC, Lucius Licinius Lucullus, formerly one of Sulla's chief lieutenants, was made proconsul of Cilicia, and commander in the Third Mithridatic War. The war began in 74 BC, when the last ruler of Bithynia died and left his kingdom to Rome, sparking an invasion by Mithridates VI of Pontus, and Tigranes the Great of Armenia. Lucullus was a skilled general who won numerous victories, but claims he was prolonging the war for "power and wealth" led to a Senate investigation. By 69 BC, his troops were weary and mutinous.

In 68 BC, Quintus Marcius Rex replaced Lucullus in Cilicia, while Manius Acilius Glabrio received Bithynia. He also assumed leadership of the war against Mithridates, but failed to respond decisively when the latter reoccupied much of Pontus in 67 BC, then attacked Cappadocia, a Roman ally. Seeing an opportunity, in 66 BC Pompey used the tribunate to pass the lex Manilia, giving him extensive powers throughout Asia Minor in order to defeat Mithridates, in addition to those granted by the lex Gabinia. The optimates were privately horrified that one man should hold so much influence, but fearful of his popularity allowed the measure to pass.

Incensed at being replaced, Lucullus called Pompey a "vulture" who profited from the work of others, a reference both to his new command and claim to have finished the war against Spartacus. Pompey agreed to an alliance with Phraates III, king of Parthia, whom he persuaded to invade Armenia. When Mithridates offered a truce, Lucullus argued the war was over, but Pompey demanded concessions that could not be accepted. Outnumbered, Mithridates withdrew into Armenia, followed by Pompey, who defeated him at Lycus near the end of 66 BC.

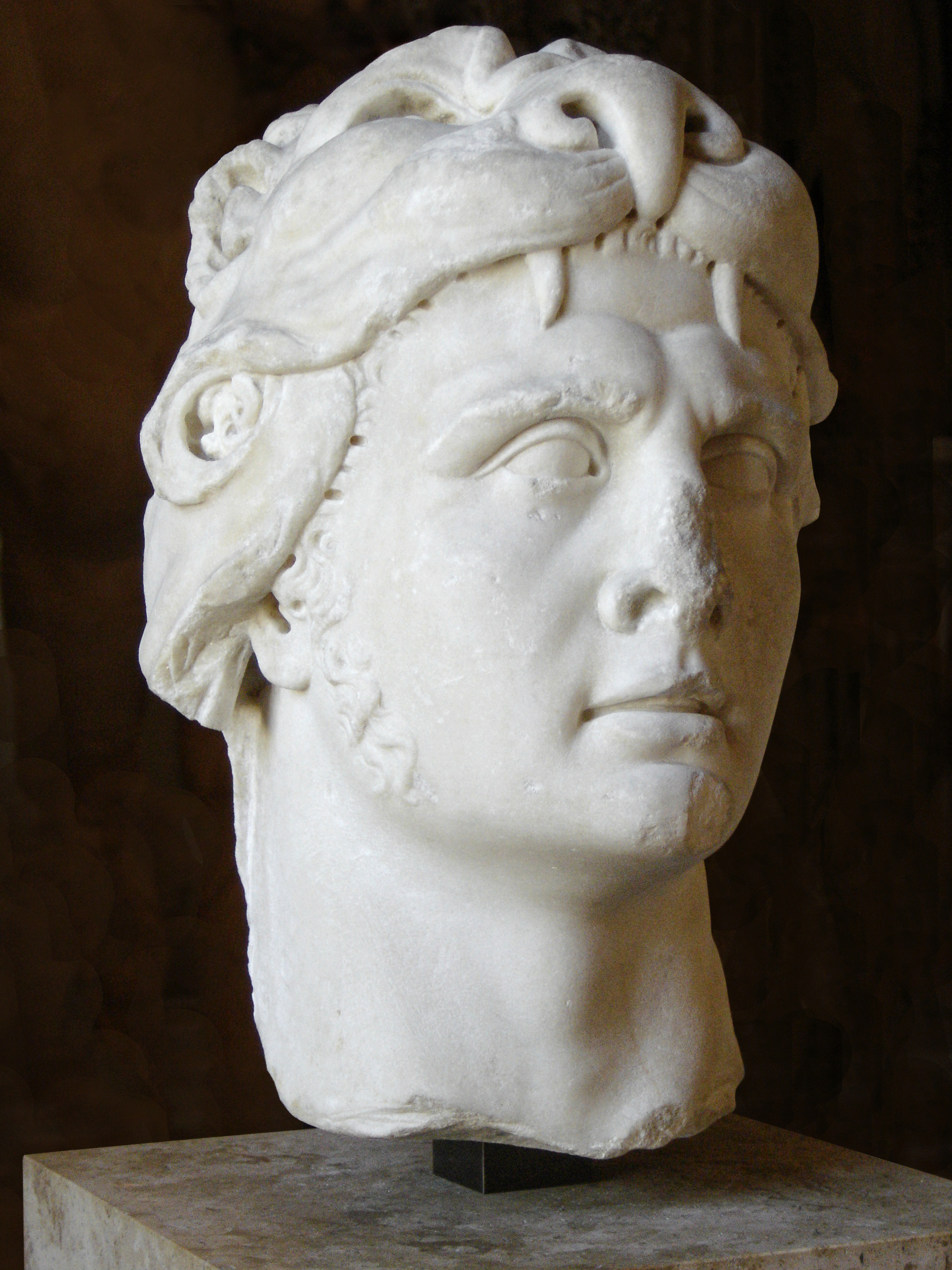
Bust of Mithridates of Pontus in the Louvre, Paris

According to contemporary sources, Mithridates and a small contingent escaped the battle, outstripped their pursuers, and reached Colchis on the Black Sea. While there, he took control of the Cimmerian Bosporus from its Roman-backed ruler, his son Machares, who later committed suicide. Meanwhile, Pompey invaded Armenia supported by Tigranes the Younger, whose father quickly came to terms; in return for the restoration of Armenian territories taken by Lucullus, he paid a substantial cash indemnity (Note: Reportedly 6,000 talents for Pompey, with tribunes getting 10,000 drachmas each, centurions 1,000, and enlisted men 50) and allowed Roman troops to be based on his territory.

In 65 BC, Pompey set out to take Colchis, but to do so had first to subdue various local tribes and allies of Mithridates. After winning a series of battles, he reached Phasis and linked up with Servilius, admiral of his Euxine fleet, before a fresh revolt in Caucasian Albania forced him to retrace his steps. Victory at the Abas enabled him to impose terms on the Albanians and agree truces with other tribes on the northern side of the Caucasus. Pompey then wintered in Armenia, settling minor border contests and raids between his allies Phraates and Tigranes.

Relying on his naval blockade to wear down Mithridates, Pompey spent 64 BC annexing the independent and wealthy cities of Syria, which were incorporated into a new Roman province. In the process, he acquired large amounts of money and prestige, as well as criticism from his opponents in Rome, who argued that doing so exceeded his authority. Meanwhile, an ageing Mithridates had been cornered in Panticapaeum by another of his sons, Pharnaces II of Pontus. He survived a suicide attempt by taking poison, allegedly due to his habit of taking "precautionary antidotes", and he was killed by the rebels. Pharnaces sent his embalmed body to Pompey, in return for which he was granted the Bosporan Kingdom and made an ally of Rome.

=== Re-organisation of the East ===
The final collapse of the Seleucid Empire allowed Pompey to annex Syria in 64 BC, but its dissolution destabilised the region, while many of its cities had used the power vacuum to achieve independence. In early 63 BC, Pompey left Antioch and marched south, occupying coastal cities like Apamea, before crossing the Anti-Lebanon Mountains and capturing Pella (in today's Jordan), and Damascus.

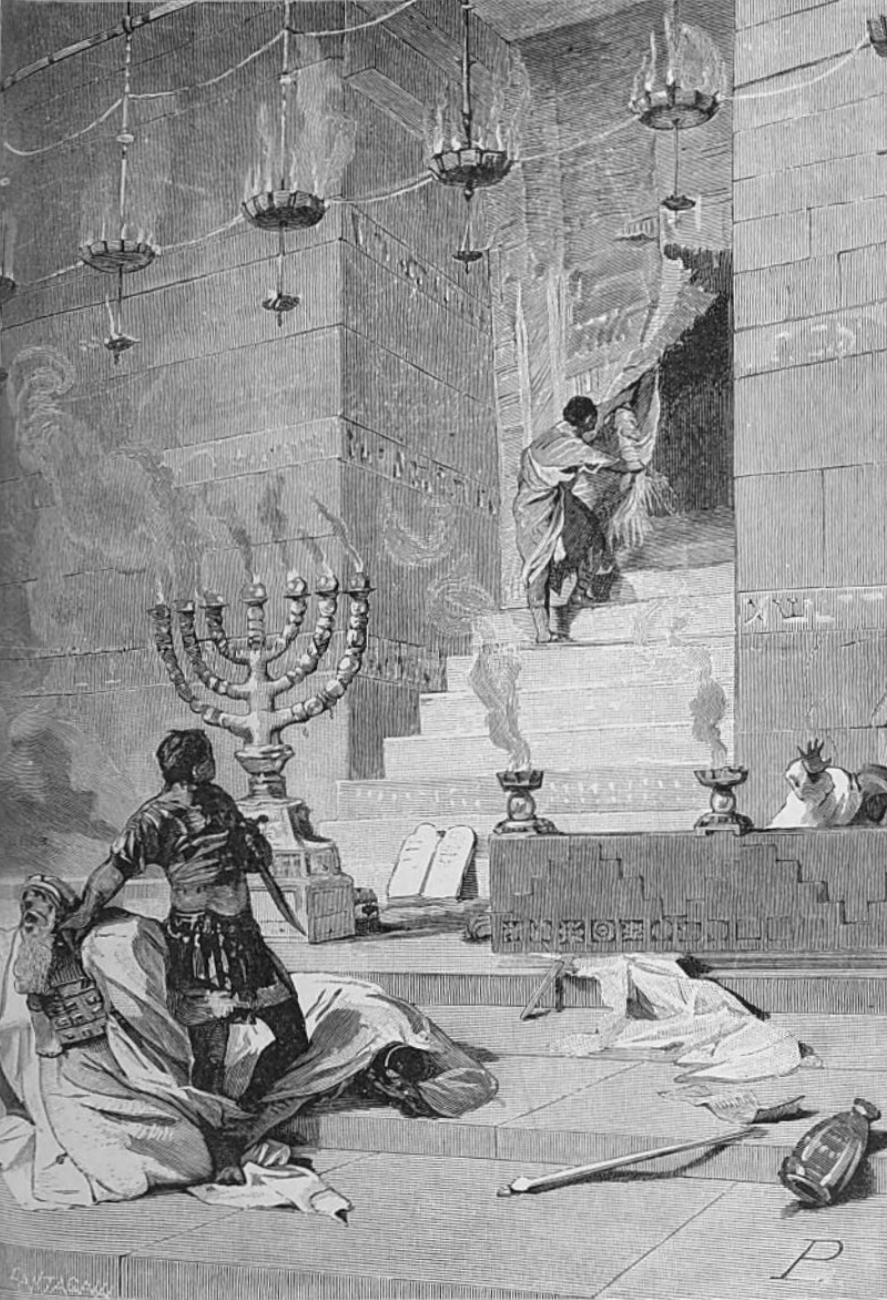
Pompey in the Holy of Holies of the Jerusalem Temple, drawing by Lodovico Pogliaghi (1883)

Pompey soon made an incursion into Judea, taking advantage of the Hasmonean Civil War, in which he backed Hyrcanus II against his brother Aristobulus II. Upon arriving in Damascus, he received delegations from both claimants: Hyrcanus argued that he was the rightful heir by primogeniture and accused Aristobulus of fomenting unrest and piracy, while Aristobulus maintained that he had assumed the kingship out of necessity because his brother was unfit to rule. According to Josephus and Diodorus Siculus, a third delegation, representing "the Jewish nation", also appealed to Pompey to abolish the monarchy and restore priestly rule.

Pompey postponed a final decision and advanced into Judea. He marched as far as Jericho, where Aristobulus met him again and promised payment and entry into the kingdom's capital, Jerusalem; however, his supporters refused to admit the Romans. Hyrcanus's supporters opened the gates, and Aristobulus's faction withdrew to the Temple Mount. Pompey then besieged the site for three months and, taking advantage of the Shabbat, Judaism's weekly day of rest, to advance his siege works. Upon capturing the Jerusalem Temple, Pompey entered the Holy of Holies, an act regarded as a desecration, since only the high priest was permitted to enter, and only once each year. Nevertheless, he did not touch its treasures and ordered the Temple to be cleansed and regular worship to resume the following day.

Following his conquest of Jerusalem, Pompey installed Hyrcanus as a client ruler, allowing him to serve as high priest while denying him the title of king; Aristobulus and his sons were taken as captives to Rome. Pompey also reduced Judea's territory, assigning many Hellenistic cities to the province of Syria, with ten of them forming the Decapolis. The detached cities included Dora, Straton's Tower, Apollonia, Joppa, Azotus, Anthedon, Gaza, Raphia, Ascalon, Maresha, Samaria, Scythopolis, Arethusa, Jamnia, Abila, Hippus, Gadara, Pella and Dium.

Other organisational changes included creating the province of Bithynia and Pontus, with the rest of Mithridates' territories distributed among Roman allies. Elsewhere, Ariobarzanes I of Cappadocia was restored to his throne, while Lesser Armenia was taken from Tigranes and incorporated into Galatia, with Pompey's client Deiotarus becoming ruler of the new kingdom. Finally, Cilicia received the coastal region of Pamphylia, previously a centre of piracy, along with other inland areas, and was reorganised into six parts. (Note: These were Cilicia Aspera, Cilicia Campestris, Pamphylia, Pisidia, Isauria, Lycaonia, and Phrygia). These actions significantly increased Roman state income and presented Pompey with multiple opportunities to increase his personal wealth and patronage base.

== Return to Rome and the First Triumvirate ==
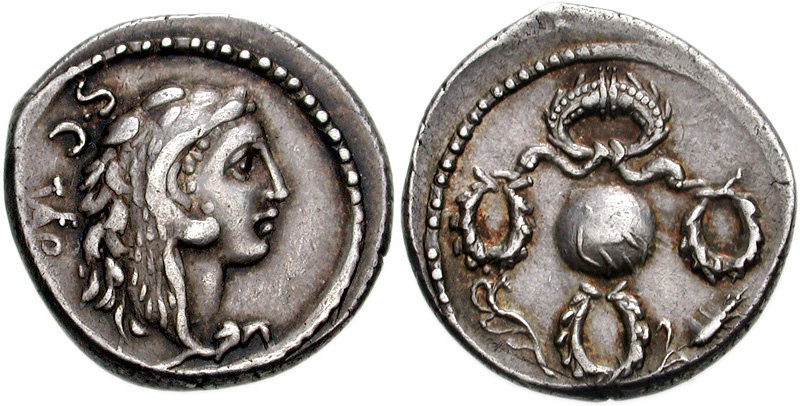
Denarius minted in 56 BC by Pompey's supporter Faustus Sulla (Note: The three wreaths on the reverse refer to the three triumphs of Pompey; the top wreath is the corona aurea he received in 62; the globe in the center is a copy of the one paraded during the third triumph; the aplustre on the lower left alludes to his victory against the pirates)

Before his return to Italy in 62 BC, Pompey paid his troops bonuses totalling around 16,000 talents, (Note: A Roman talent was roughly 32 kilograms of gold, making this distribution worth over $32 billion using 2023 prices) but despite fears he intended to follow Sulla's example, they were dismissed upon arrival at Brundisium. His journey to Rome drew huge crowds wherever he stopped, showing that although opinion in the Senate was divided, Pompey remained as popular as ever with the masses. He was awarded a third triumph for his achievements in Asia Minor, celebrated on his 45th birthday in 61 BC.

Pompey claimed the new provinces established in the East had increased annual state income from 200 million to 340 million sesterces, plus an additional payment of 480 million sesterces to the treasury. He refused to provide details of his personal fortune, but given the amounts declared publicly, this must have been enormous. Some of it was used to build one of the most famous structures of Ancient Rome, the Theatre of Pompey.

However, the Senate then refused to ratify the treaties agreed by Pompey as part of his settlement of the East. Opposition was led by the optimates Cato the Younger and Metellus Celer, whose sister Mucia had recently been divorced by Pompey, for reasons still disputed. (Note: The divorce may also have been a factor in the defection of Metellus Nepos, previously one of Pompey's main supporters, although the Metelli had their own political ambitions.) They also defeated a bill to distribute farmland to his veterans, and landless members of the urban poor. A similar measure had been rejected in 63 BC, which arguably made the Senate overconfident in their ability to control popular unrest.

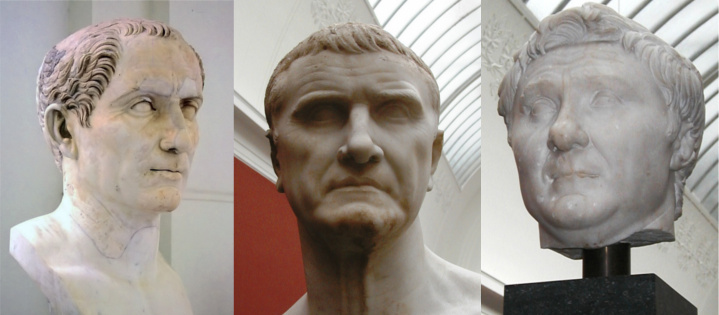
The First Triumvirate; left to right, Caesar, Crassus, and Pompey

Although Pompey could not overcome optimate opposition on his own, the situation changed when Marius' nephew Julius Caesar sought his endorsement for the consulship in 59 BC. A skilled, unscrupulous, and ambitious politician, Caesar used this alliance to harness Pompey's influence with the urban electorate. With additional support from Crassus, Caesar became one of the two consuls for 59 BC, the other being the optimate Marcus Calpurnius Bibulus. This meant Caesar could help pass legislation sponsored by Pompey and Crassus, while it was in his interest to keep them aligned, an important factor given the rivalry between his two patrons.

Despite appearing to be the most junior, Caesar thus became central to the First Triumvirate, an informal political alliance designed to counter-balance the optimates. Pompey's influence was based on his reputation as a military commander and popularity with the Roman people. Crassus' wealth allowed him to construct extensive patronage networks, but he lacked the military clout essential for political success in the late Republican era.

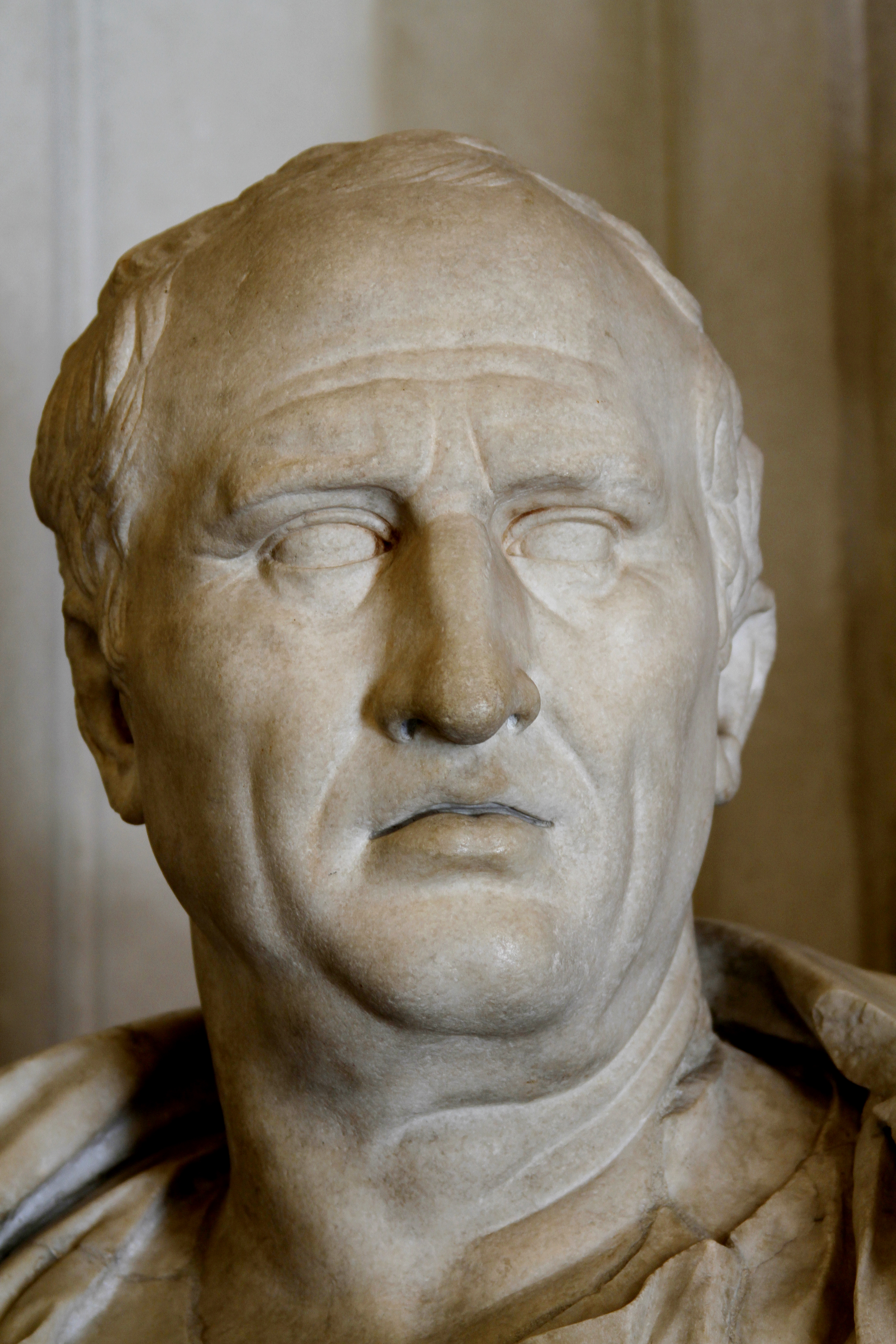
Marcus Tullius Cicero, leader of optimate opposition to the triumvirate who became an ally of Pompey

Once elected, Caesar secured the passage of a new agrarian bill, helped by Pompey's veterans, who filled the streets of Rome and allegedly intimidated the Senate. When Bibulus opposed the measure, he was attacked in the forum, and spent the rest of his consulship under virtual house arrest. Caesar then ensured ratification of Pompey's settlements in the east, while the Lex Vatinia made him governor of Gallia Cisalpina and Illyricum. He was also assigned Gallia Transalpina after its governor died in office, before leaving Rome to launch the Gallic Wars in 58 BC. His alliance with Pompey was strengthened when the latter married Caesar's daughter Julia.

Senatorial opposition to the triumvirate was led by Cicero, a long-standing Pompeian ally. Despite this, the latter supported the populist politician Publius Clodius Pulcher in an attack on Cicero for executing Roman citizens without trial during the Catilinarian conspiracy. Although Clodius succeeded in having Cicero exiled, he was recalled to Rome by Pompey eighteen months later in 57 BC. As a result, when shortages of grain caused popular unrest later that year, a grateful Cicero backed Pompey's appointment as praefectus annonae, a temporary position set up for such occasions.

Pompey and Crassus were competing for command of a new expedition to Asia Minor, and in 56 BC they met with Caesar to resolve these issues. Although Crassus was a long-standing rival, there are also indications Pompey felt his status as the foremost soldier of the Republic was threatened by Caesar's success in Gaul. With this in mind, Pompey set aside his differences with Crassus to promote their joint candidature as consuls for 55 BC. With Caesar's support, they were duly elected after prolonged periods of violence, which had become a feature of Roman political campaigns.

Once in office, they ensured the passage of a law giving Crassus the province of Syria and command of a punitive expedition against Parthia, providing him opportunities for both military glory and loot. Pompey was assigned the restive provinces of Hispania, along with Africa, while Caesar's governorships in Gaul were extended. All three men were given these positions for a period of five years, as well as the right to levy troops and "make peace and war with whomsoever they pleased".

== From confrontation to civil war ==
The Roman Empire and satellite states, prior to the outbreak of civil war c. 49 BC

In 54 BC, Caesar continued his conquest of Gaul, Crassus opened his campaign against the Parthians, and Pompey remained in Rome, where his wife Julia died in childbirth in September. Contemporary sources suggest that combined with the death of Crassus and his son Publius at Carrhae in May 53 BC, this removed any obstacle to direct confrontation between Caesar and Pompey. (Note: Historian Florus wrote "Pompey could not brook an equal, or Caesar a superior.")

Consular elections in 52 BC had to be suspended due to widespread violence. Seeking to end his alliance with Caesar, the optimate Bibulus proposed Pompey be elected sole consul, an unprecedented act backed by both Cato and the tribunate. Having restored order, Pompey married Cornelia, widow of Publius Crassus and daughter of Metellus Scipio Nasica, whom he appointed as his colleague for the last five months of the year.

As consul, Pompey helped enact legislation which some historians view as crucial to understanding the drift to war in 49 BC. Accused of using violence during his consulship in 59 BC, Caesar had previously been shielded by his proconsular immunity. With private support from Pompey, new laws made such prosecutions retrospective, which meant Caesar would probably be put on trial the moment he left Gaul and lost his Imperium. To avoid this, he had secured approval to stand for the consulship in 48 BC while still in Gaul, but another law backed by Pompey required electoral candidates to be physically present in Rome.

Although the two continued to co-operate in public, Pompey clearly viewed his colleague as a threat, as did much of the Senate. Both consuls for 50 BC, Paullus and Gaius Claudius, were opponents of Caesar, as was Curio, a plebeian tribune. They initiated legislation to remove Caesar from his command in Gaul, who allegedly bypassed this by bribing Paullus and Curio. For whatever reason, Curio came up with an alternative proposal; Caesar and Pompey should disarm at the same time, or be declared enemies of the state.

This was a clever move, since it was popular with those who wanted to avoid war, but unacceptable to the optimates who saw Caesar as a danger that had to be eliminated. Rejection made open conflict more likely, and the Senate agreed to fund a consular army, organised by Pompey. When he fell ill while recruiting in Naples, the celebrations that followed his recovery allegedly convinced Pompey his popularity was sufficient to see off any opponent. In December, Caesar crossed the Alps with a single veteran legion and arrived at Ravenna, close to the border with the Roman Republic. (Note: Now in Northern Italy, Ravenna was then a federated ally of the Roman Republic)

A significant number of senators opposed any concessions to Caesar, but many also mistrusted Pompey, who had been criticised for "weak and ineffectual leadership" in this period. On 1 January 49 BC, Caesar sent an ultimatum demanding acceptance of his compromise, failing which he would march on Rome "to avenge his country's wrongs". Confident their forces significantly outnumbered those available to Caesar, on 7 January the Senate declared him a public enemy; four days later, he crossed the Rubicon into Italy.

== The Road to Pharsalus ==
When the war began, Caesar was a rebel with no navy and three understrength legions, while Pompey was backed by all the resources of the Roman state and his clients in the East. However, his position was weaker than it seemed, since he was simply an advisor to the Senate, many of whose members either preferred a negotiated solution, or regarded him with as much suspicion as Caesar. His military strategy had to be approved by the consuls, and he could only issue recommendations, which were not always followed. For example, Cicero rejected a request to help him with recruitment, and Cato refused to take command of Sicily, vital for control of Rome's grain supply.

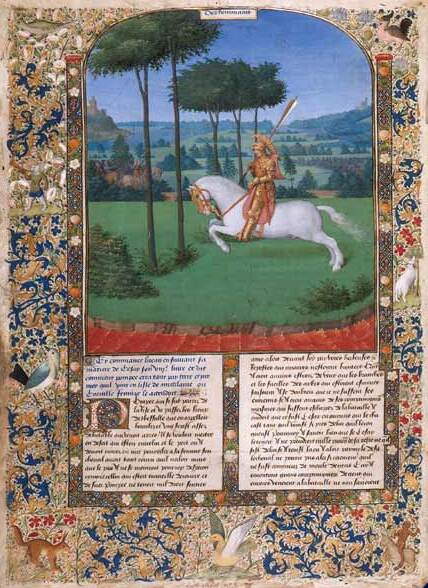
The Flight of Pompey after Pharsalus, by Jean Fouquet

Plans to defend Italy were undone by the speed with which Caesar moved, advancing directly on Rome with minimal resistance. Although outnumbered, his troops were experienced veterans, while many of Pompey's were recruits, a weakness made worse by lack of coordination. Cato's brother-in-law, the optimate leader Lucius Domitius, was cut off and captured in a hopeless defence of Corfinium, and his 13,000 men incorporated into Caesar's army. Led by Asinius Pollio, they were later used to occupy Sicily.

Pompey had abandoned Rome, ordering all senators and public officials to accompany him as he withdrew south to Brundisium. From there, he transported his troops across the Adriatic to Dyrrhachium in Thessaly, an operation performed with almost complete success. Lacking ships to pursue him, Caesar first secured his rear by subduing Pompeian forces in Hispania, before returning to Rome in December 49 BC. This gave Pompey time to build an army nearly twice the size of his opponents', while his navy destroyed two fleets being built for Caesar, ensuring the Pompeians retained control of the sea lanes.

Despite this, in January 48 BC Caesar managed to cross the Adriatic with seven legions and land in southern Albania. After capturing Oricum and Apollonia, he advanced on Pompey's main supply base at Dyrrhachium. The latter arrived in time to block the attempt, and establish a fortified camp on the other side of the River Apus, where the two armies remained until spring. (Note: Pompey was based at Petra, a small port north of Dyrrhachium, roughly on the site of modern Shkëmbi i Kavajës in Albania) Neither commander was anxious to begin hostilities, since Caesar was too weak militarily, while as with Mithridates, Pompey preferred to starve his opponent into submission.

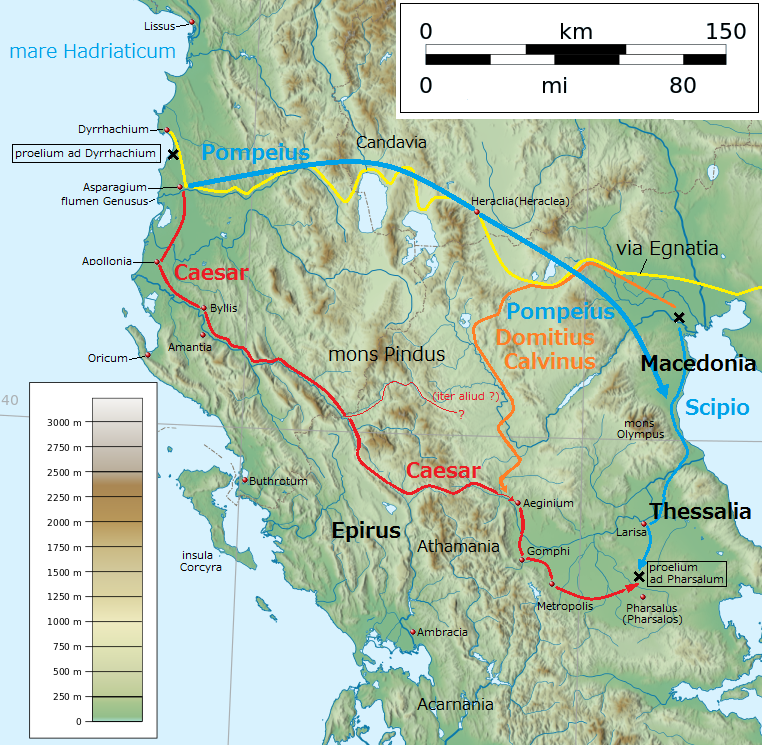
The Pharsalus campaign, 48 BC

In late March, the stalemate was broken when Mark Antony finally managed to cross the Adriatic with four more legions and land at Nymphaeum, some 57 kilometres north of Dyrrachium. Pompey tried to prevent the two Caesarian armies from linking up by marching north-east and laying an ambush for Antony. The ambush, however, was revealed to Antony by some local Caesarian sympathisers, and he stayed in camp until Caesar approached. Unwilling to be caught between the two Caesarian forces, Pompey withdrew.

Caesar, his army now united with Antony's force, redeployed his forces by sending one-and-a-half legions to win support and gather supplies in Aetolia and Thessaly, and a further two legions under Domitius Calvinus to intercept Metellus Scipio in Macedonia. Meanwhile, Gnaeus, Pompey's oldest son, managed to destroy Caesar's fleet at Oricum and Lissus, making sure no more reinforcements and supplies would reach Caesar from Italy. Caesar tried to lure Pompey into a pitched battle at Asparagium, but the latter refused. The next day, Caesar outmaneuvered Pompey and marched for Dyrrachium again. When Pompey arrived at the city, Caesar had already set up camp.

Caesar lacked the siege equipment needed to take Dyrrhachium, and could not risk leaving Pompey to threaten his rear. He solved this by besieging Pompey in his camp. Although the latter had enough food, water was scarce because Caesar had dammed the local rivers, and the Pompeian cavalry lacked forage for their horses. Ending the stalemate became a matter of urgency, and in late July Pompey finally managed to break through part of Caesar's defensive lines. Since this made the blockade pointless, Caesar cut his losses and withdrew to Apollonia.

At this point, Metellus Scipio arrived in Thessaly. Caesar moved south to confront this threat and link up with Domitius Calvinus, allowing his men to sack Gomphi en route. Pursued by Pompey, he then withdrew to the area near Pharsalus, but failed to tempt Pompey into giving battle. (Note: The exact location of the battle is still disputed) Although it was later claimed Pompey only did so after being pressured by his subordinates, the delay may simply have been a reflection of his natural caution.

Regardless, in the ensuing Battle of Pharsalus Pompey's army of around 38,000 outnumbered the 22,000 men commanded by Caesar, (Note: these numbers refer to legionaries and do not include the light-armed troops provided by allied rulers and nations) with 7,000 cavalry to 1,000. On 9 August, he deployed his men in battle formation, planning to use his superior cavalry to outflank his opponent on his left. Caesar had anticipated this and repulsed the cavalry, which fled in confusion, exposing the infantry behind them. Under pressure from the left and in front, the Pompeian army collapsed.

== Death ==
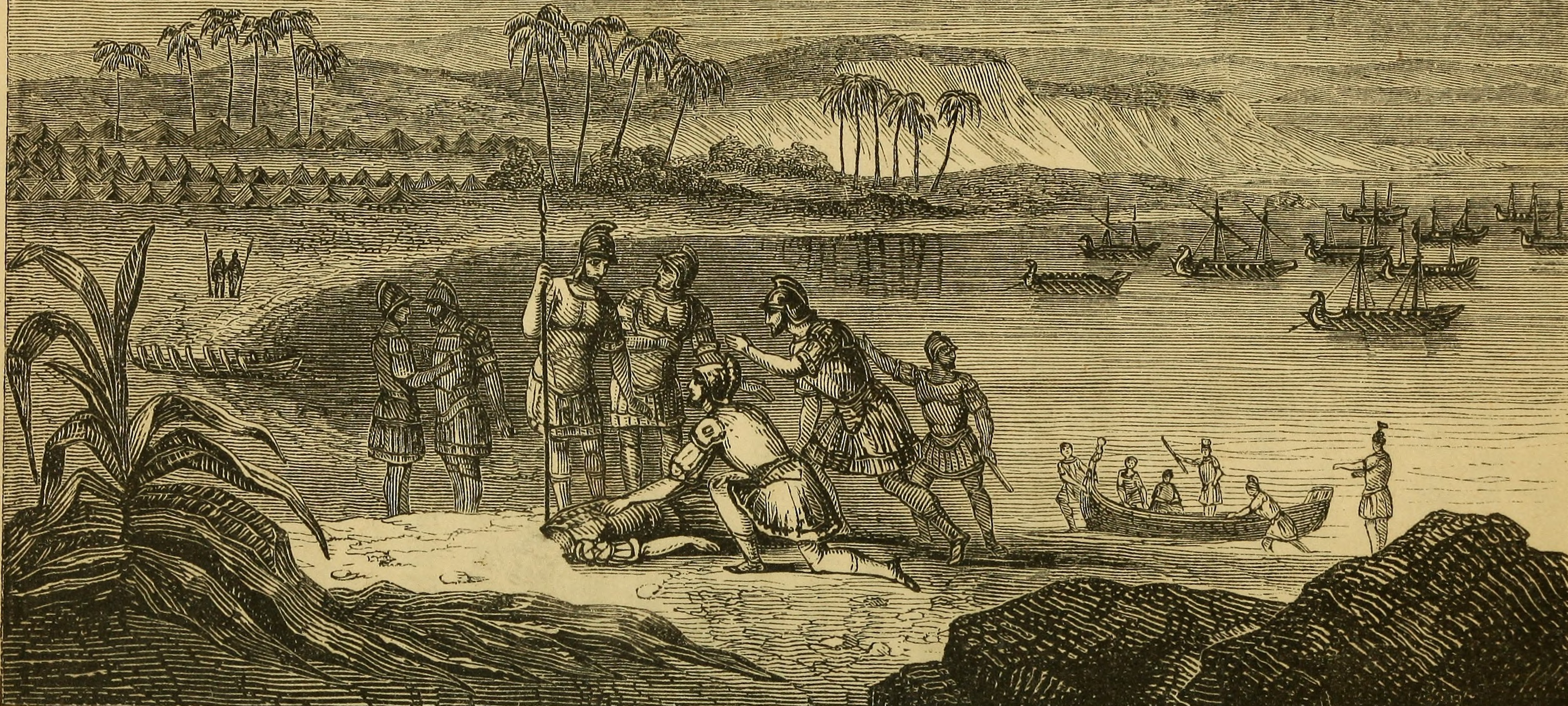
Death of Pompey Magnus; 18th-century engraving

Pompey escaped from the battlefield and made his way to Mytilene, where he was reunited with his wife Cornelia. Most of his Eastern allies were present at Pharsalus and had either been killed or captured. The main absentee was 14-year-old Ptolemy XIII, ruler of the wealthy and strategically important kingdom of Egypt, making it an obvious destination. Cato announced his intention to continue the war from Africa, although most of his senatorial colleagues, including Cicero and Marcus Junius Brutus, made their peace with Caesar and returned to Rome.

Pompey sailed from Cyprus with a small fleet, and on 28 September 48 BC arrived at Pelusium in Egypt, where Ptolemy was engaged in a bitter civil war with his co-ruler and elder sister, Cleopatra VII. When he went ashore to greet an official delegation, Pompey was killed by Lucius Septimius, a Roman officer and former colleague serving in the Egyptian army. His body was cremated by two servants, while the head was kept as evidence.

One suggestion is that Ptolemy and his advisors feared Pompey planned to seize control of Egypt, especially since many Egyptian army officers were Roman mercenaries like Septimius who had previously served with him. At the same time, it seemed an easy way to win Caesar's support against Cleopatra, although ultimately this proved not to be the case. Pompey's head was later returned to Cornelia for burial at his villa in the Alban Hills, while his ignominious death prompted Cicero to write "his life outlasted his power".

== Marriages and issue ==
Pompey had five wives:

- Antistia. They married in 86 BC and divorced in 82 BC. By her he had no issue.
- Aemilia Scaura. When they married in 82 BC, Aemilia was pregnant by her former husband and died in childbirth in the same year.
- Mucia Tertia. They married in 79 BC and divorced in 61 BC. By her he had two sons and a daughter:
  - Gnaeus Pompeius
  - Pompeia
  - Sextus Pompeius
- Julia, the daughter of Julius Caesar. They married in 59 BC and she died in childbirth in 54 BC. The child died a few days after birth.
- Cornelia Metella. They married in 52 BC and had no children together.

== Generalship ==
Pompey's military glory was second to none for two decades, yet his decisions were occasionally criticized by some of his contemporaries. Sertorius or Lucullus, for instance, were especially critical. Pompey's tactics were usually efficient, albeit not particularly innovative or imaginative, and they could prove insufficient against greater tacticians. However, Pharsalus was his only decisive defeat. At times, he was reluctant to risk an open battle. While not extremely charismatic, Pompey could display tremendous bravery and fighting skills on the battlefield, which inspired his men. While being a superb commander, Pompey also earned a reputation for stealing other generals' victories.

On the other hand, Pompey is usually considered an outstanding strategist and organizer, who could win campaigns without displaying genius on the battlefield, but simply by constantly outmaneuvering his opponents and gradually pushing them into a desperate situation. Pompey was a great planner, and had tremendous organizational skill, which allowed him to devise grand strategies and operate effectively with large armies. During his campaigns in the east, he relentlessly pursued his enemies, choosing the ground for his battles.

Above all, he was often able to adapt to his enemies and showed determination. On many occasions, he acted very swiftly and decisively, as he did during his campaigns in Sicily and Africa, or against the Cilician pirates. During the Sertorian War, on the other hand, Pompey was beaten several times by Sertorius. Despite an abysmal first year of the war for Pompey in 76 BC, he continued to campaign vigorously and as a result defeated many of Sertorius' subordinates. After Sertorius' army was greatly diminished, Pompey then decided to conduct a war of attrition, in which he would avoid open battles against his chief opponent but instead tried to gradually regain the strategic advantage by capturing his fortresses and cities and defeating his junior officers. This strategy was unspectacular, but it led to constant territorial gains and did much to demoralize the Sertorian forces. By 73 or 72 BC, when he was assassinated, Sertorius was already in a desperate situation, and his troops were deserting. Against Perperna, a tactician far inferior to his former commander-in-chief, Pompey decided to revert to a more aggressive strategy, and he scored a decisive victory that effectively ended the war.

Against Caesar, too, his strategy was sound. During the campaign in Greece, he managed to regain the initiative, join his forces to those of Metellus Scipio (something that Caesar wanted to avoid), and trap his enemy. His strategic position was therefore much better than that of Caesar, and he could have starved Caesar's army to death. However, he was finally compelled to fight an open battle by his allies, and his conventional tactics proved no match to those of Caesar (who also commanded the more experienced troops).

== Literary heritage ==
Pompey was so striking a figure, and his fall so dramatic, that his story became the subject of frequent literary treatment. In the century after his death, the civil war between himself and Caesar was retold in Lucan's epic De Bello Civili, now known as the Pharsalia after the culminating battle. In the poem's final sections, however, Pompey's vengeful ghost returns to possess those responsible for his murder in Egypt and bring about their death.

In Renaissance Britain, too, several plays returned to the subject of "Caesar and Pompey", including George Chapman's The Wars of Pompey and Caesar (c. 1604). Another contemporary treatment by Thomas Kyd, Cornelia, or Pompey the Great, his faire Cornelia's tragedy (1594), was a translation from the French of Robert Garnier. Later in France, Pompey's story was told without the character appearing onstage in Pierre Corneille's La Mort de Pompée (1643) and this too had English adaptations: as Pompey (1663) by Catherine Philips, as Pompey the Great by Edmund Waller and others in 1664, and later as The Death of Pompey (1724) by Colley Cibber.

Later in the 18th century, Pompey is made the recipient of a 'heroical epistle' in rhyming couplets from a supposed former lover in John Hervey's "Flora to Pompey". He also figures in narrative poems of the 19th century. John Edmund Reade's "The Vale of Tempe" records the fugitive's desperate appearance as glimpsed by a bystander in the Greek valley; his arrival in Egypt is related by Alaric Watts in "The Death of Pompey the Great", and the ruined column raised to mark the site of his killing outside Alexandria is described by Nicholas Michell in Ruins of Many Lands. These were followed by John Masefield's prose drama The Tragedy of Pompey the Great of 1910, covering the period from his decision to fight Caesar to his assassination in Egypt. The play was later filmed for television in 1950 for the BBC Sunday Night Theatre.

Pompey's career is recapitulated a century later in a series of historical novels. In Colleen McCullough's Masters of Rome, Pompey is mainly featured in Books III-V, covering his rise to prominence through to his betrayal and murder in Egypt. Pompey is also a recurring character in Steven Saylor's Roma Sub Rosa crime fiction novels, where he brushes shoulders with Gordianus, the main protagonist of the series. Another fiction series in which Pompey plays a part in the historical background is Robert Harris's trilogy of the life of Cicero.

== Chronology of Pompey's life and career ==
- 29 September 106 BC – Born in Picenum;
- 89 BC – Serves under his father at Asculum (during the Social War);
- 86 BC – Marriage to Antistia;
- 83 BC – Aligns with Sulla, after his return from the First Mithridatic War against King Mithridates VI of Pontus, raising a legion and cavalry in hopes of joining him;
- 83–82 BC – Fights for Sulla during the war in Italy. First as cavalry commander then joint-commands and finally commanding an independent army.
- 82 BC – Divorce by Antistia and marriage to Aemilia at the behest of Sulla, but Aemilia is already pregnant and eventually dies during childbirth;
- 82–81 BC – Defeats Gaius Marius' allies in Sicily and Africa;
- 81 BC – Returns to Rome and celebrates first triumph;
- 79 BC – Pompey marries Mucia Tertia, of the Mucii Scaevolae family;
- 79 BC – Pompey supports the election of Marcus Aemilius Lepidus, who openly revolts against the Senate a few months later. Pompey suppresses the rebellion with an army raised from Picenum and puts down the rebellion, killing the rebel Marcus Junius Brutus, father of Brutus, who would go on to assassinate Julius Caesar;
- 76–71 BC – Campaign in Hispania against Sertorius;
- 71 BC – Returns to Italy and participates in the suppression of a slave rebellion led by Spartacus, obtaining his second triumph;
- 70 BC – First consulship (with Marcus Licinius Crassus);
- 67 BC – Defeats the pirates and goes to the province of Asia;
- 66–61 BC – Defeats King Mithridates of Pontus, ending the Third Mithridatic War;
- 64–63 BC – Marches through Syria, the Levant, and Judea;
- 61 BC – Divorce by Mucia Tertia;
- 29 September 61 BC – Third triumph;
- April 59 BC – The so-called first triumvirate is constituted. Pompey allies with Julius Caesar and Crassus, marrying Caesar's daughter Julia;
- 58–55 BC – Governs Hispania Ulterior by proxy, while the Theater of Pompey is constructed;
- 55 BC – Second consulship (with Marcus Licinius Crassus), and the Theater of Pompey is finally inaugurated;
- 54 BC – Julia dies in childbirth, and the first triumvirate ends;
- 52 BC – Serves as sole consul for an intercalary month, but has a third ordinary consulship with Metellus Scipio for the rest of the year, marrying his daughter Cornelia Metella;
- 51 BC – Forbids Caesar (in Gaul) to stand for consulship in absentia;
- 50 BC – Falls dangerously ill with fever in Campania, but is saved "by public prayers";
- 49 BC – Caesar crosses the Rubicon river and invades Italy, while Pompey retreats to Greece with the conservatives;
- 48 BC – Caesar defeats Pompey's army near Pharsalus, Greece. Pompey retreats to Egypt and is killed at Pelusium.

== Bibliography ==
- Abbott, Frank Frost (1963). A History and Description of Roman Political Institutions. Biblo and Tannen.
- Beard, Mary (2015). SPQR: A History of Ancient Rome (2016 ed.). Profile Press. ISBN 978-1846683817.
- Beesley, A. (1892). The Gracchi Marius and Sulla Epochs of Ancient History (2017 ed.). Pinnacle Press. ISBN 978-0-345-47609-8.
- Boak, Edward (1921). A History of Rome to 565 AD (2016 ed.). Wentworth Publishing. ISBN 978-1363094448.
- Brice, Lee (2014). Warfare in the Roman Republic: from the Etruscan Wars to the Battle of Actium. Santa Barbara, Calif.: ABC-CLIO. ISBN 978-1610692991.
- Collins, H.P. (1953). "Decline and Fall of Pompey the Great". Greece and Rome. 22 (66): 98–106. doi:10.1017/S0017383500011888. JSTOR 641489. S2CID 161450990.
- Crawford, Michael H. (1974). Roman Republican coinage. London: Cambridge University Press. ISBN 0-521-07492-4. OCLC 1288923.
- De Souza, Philip (2002). Piracy in the Graeco-Roman World. Cambridge: Cambridge University Press. ISBN 978-0-521-01240-9.
- Drogula, Fred K. (2019). Cato the Younger: Life and death at the end of the Roman Republic. Oxford University Press. ISBN 978-0190869021.
- Flower, Harriet (2014). The Cambridge Companion to the Roman Republic. CUP. ISBN 978-1107032248.
- Goldsworthy, Adrian (2004). In the name of Rome: The Men Who Won the Roman Empire. London: Phoenix. ISBN 978-0753817896.
- Goldsworthy, Adrian (2006). Caesar; The Life of a Colossus (2013 ed.). Orion. ISBN 978-0297864004.
- Grabbe, Lester L. (2020). A History of the Jews and Judaism in the Second Temple Period, Volume 3: The Maccabaean Revolt, Hasmonaean Rule, and Herod the Great (175–4 BCE). The Library of Second Temple Studies. T&T Clark. ISBN 978-0-5676-9294-8.
- Gray, Eric William. "Pompey the Great". Encyclopaedia Britannica.
- Greenhalgh, P. (1981). Pompey: The Republican Prince. Littlehampton Book Services Ltd. ISBN 978-0297778813.
- Gruen, Erich (1995). The Last Generation of the Roman Republic. University of California. ISBN 978-0520022386.
- Haley, Shelley (April 1985). "The Five Wives of Pompey the Great". Greece and Rome. 32 (1): 49–59. doi:10.1017/S0017383500030138. ISSN 1477-4550. JSTOR 642299. S2CID 154822339.
- Holland, Tom (2004). Rubicon, The Triumph and Tragedy of the Roman Republic. Abacus. ISBN 978-0349115634.
- Keppie, Lawrence (1984). The Making of the Roman Army: From Republic to Empire (2015 ed.). Routledge. ISBN 978-1138129139.
- Kuritz, Paul (1987). The Making of Theatre History. Prentice Hall. ISBN 978-0-13-547861-5.
- Leach, John (1978). Pompey the Great. London: Croom Helm. ISBN 0-8476-6035-4.
- Matyszak, Philip (2013). Sertorius and the Struggle for Spain. Pen and Sword. ISBN 978-1848847873.
- Mitchell, Thomas (1973). "Cicero, Pompey and the Rise of the First Triumvirate". Traditio. 29: 1–26. doi:10.1017/S0362152900008953. JSTOR 641489. S2CID 152020610.
- Morrill, Kit (2017). Pompey, Cato, and the Governance of the Roman Empire. OUP. ISBN 978-0198755142.
- Ramsey, John (2016). "How and why was Pompey Made Sole Consul in 52 BC?". Historia: Zeitschrift für Alte Geschichte. 65 (3): 298–324. JSTOR 45019234.
- Rosenblitt, Alison (2014). "The Turning Tide: The Politics of the Year 79 B.C.E.". Transactions of the American Philological Association. 144 (2): 415–431. doi:10.1353/apa.2014.0008. JSTOR 43830445. S2CID 144556938.
- Seager, R (2002). Pompey the Great: A Political Biography. Wiley-Blackwell. ISBN 978-0826203564.
- Stanton, John (2003). "Why Did Caesar Cross the Rubicon?". Historia: Zeitschrift für Alte Geschichte. 52 (1): 67–94. JSTOR 4436678.
- Tröster, Manuel (2009). "Roman Hegemony and Non-State Violence: A Fresh Look at Pompey's Campaign against the Pirates". Greece and Rome. 56 (1): 14–33. doi:10.1017/S0017383508000673. JSTOR 40388852. S2CID 154000527.
- Wylle, Graham (1992). "The Road to Pharsalus". Latomus. 51 (3): 557–565. JSTOR 41541372.

Political offices
Preceded by P. Cornelius Lentulus Sura; Cn. Aufidius Orestes	Roman consul 70 BC; With: M. Licinius Crassus	Succeeded by Q. Hortensius Hortalus; Q. Caecilius Metellus Creticus
Preceded by Cn. Cornelius Lentulus Marcellinus; L. Marcius Philippus	Roman consul II; 55 BC; With: M. Licinius Crassus II	Succeeded by L. Domitius Ahenobarbus; Ap. Claudius Pulcher
Preceded by Cn. Domitius Calvinus; M. Valerius Messalla Rufus	Roman consul III; Intercalary Month, 52 BC without colleague	Succeeded by Himself; Metellus Scipio
Preceded by Himself	Roman consul 52 BC; With: Metellus Scipio	Succeeded by Ser. Sulpicius Rufus; M. Claudius Marcellus
