= Henry Carrington Lancaster =

Henry Carrington Lancaster (November 10, 1882 – January 29, 1954) was a prominent American scholar—the world's foremost expert on French dramatic literature in the 16th through 18th centuries.

Lancaster's scholarship was recognised in France with the Légion d'honneur (chevalier in 1932, promoted to officer in 1948) and an honorary doctorate from the Sorbonne in 1946. He was elected a member of the American Philosophical Society in 1938 and the American Academy of Arts and Sciences in 1939. For most of Lancaster's academic life, he was chair of the Romance Languages Department and professor of French literature at Johns Hopkins University. "A meticulous scholar and a mine of factual information," he authored twenty volumes on French dramatic literature. In its June 2008 issue, Johns Hopkins Magazine chose two professors who epitomized the most excellent, distinguished and well-loved, throughout the history of Johns Hopkins: one in recent times, and one past. Lancaster was selected for a feature article and full-page photograph. Carrington Lancaster's papers are held at Johns Hopkins.

== Life ==
Lancaster was born in Richmond, Virginia, as one of 13 siblings. He graduated with a B.A. within three years from the University of Virginia, then taught for a year at a southern private boys' school, before earning his PhD at Johns Hopkins University in 1907. He chose Amherst College for his first academic research and teaching appointment. One of his closest professor friends there introduced Carrington—a tall handsome bachelor—to his younger sister, Helen Converse Clark—beautiful smart and poetic. Lancaster fell in love lifelong, as she with him. She was a student at Barnard College at the time, and daughter of the eminent U.S. economist Johns Bates Clark of Columbia University (advisor to three presidents, honored namesake of the nation's annual John Bates Clark Award in Economics). He married Helen Clark in 1913, and they made their first home in Amherst, where they were neighbors and close friends of Robert Frost. Their first two children, John Huntington Lancaster, and Helen Clark Lancaster were born in Amherst (Robert Frost awaiting Helen's birth with Lancaster on his back porch).

After moving to Baltimore In 1919— to succeed Edward C. Armstrong as professor at Johns Hopkins— Maria Dabney Lancaster and Henry C. Lancaster Jr. were born. The family spent his sabbaticals in France. So beloved and respected was Carrington by his students, academic peers and friends, that they presented him with Adventures of a literary historian, a collection of his writings in anticipation of his sixtieth birthday, November 10, 1942.

Lancaster, a Baltimorean, also wrote and spoke about Democratic causes. Originally Episcopalian, he became a Presbyterian church-goer with his family. They loved summer weeks at Rockywold-Deephaven Camps in Holderness, NH. Lancaster also enjoyed swimming, walking/hiking in nature, entertaining colleagues and friends, writing clever poems and limericks, and taking care of the family dog, Blarney.

== Works ==
- The French Tragi-Comedy: its origin and development from 1552 to 1628, 1907.
- Pierre Du Ryer, dramatist, 1912.
- A History of French Dramatic Literature in the Seventeenth Century, nine volumes, 1929–1942.
- Five French Farces, 1655–1694, as editor, 1937.
- The Comédie française, 1680–1701: plays, actors, spectators, finances, 1941.
- Adventures of a Literary Historian: a collection of his writings presented to H. Carrington Lancaster by his former students and other friends in anticipation of his sixtieth birthday, November 10, 1942, 1942.
- Sunset, a History of Parisian Drama in the Last Years of Louis XIV, 1701–1715, 1945.
- French Tragedy in the Time of Louis XV and Voltaire, 1715–1774, two volumes, 1950.
- The Comédie française, 1701–1774: plays, actors, spectators, finances, 1951.
- French Tragedy in the Reign of Louis XVI and the Early years of the French Revolution, 1774–1792, 1953.
- Actors' roles at the Comédie française, 1953.
