= Battle of Lemnos (73 BCE) =

Battle between the fleets of Rome and Pontus in the Third Mithridatic War

- Part of the Third Mithridatic War
Date	73 BC
Location	Lemnos
Result	Roman victory

Belligerents
Rome	Pontus

Commanders and leaders
Lucius Licinius Lucullus	Marcus Marius (or Varius); Alexander the Paphlagonian; Dionysius the eunuch

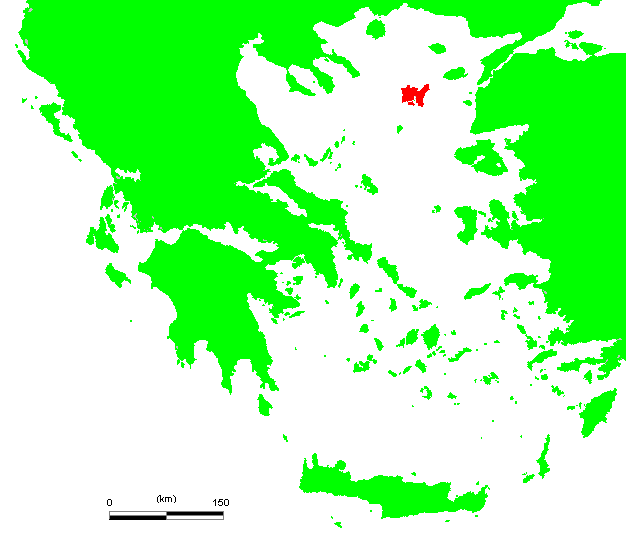
Lemnos

The Battle of Lemnos was fought on the island of Lemnos in 73 BC between a Roman fleet and a Mithridatic fleet; it was a decisive event during the Third Mithridatic War. The primary chroniclers of the battle are Appian, Cicero and Memnon, but there remain debates about the specifics in these different accounts.

== Background ==
After his defeat at the hands of Lucius Cornelius Sulla during the First Mithridatic War (89-85 BC) Mithridates had rebuilt his power and armies. In 74 BC, Nicomedes IV the king of Bithynia died, the Romans claimed he had left them his kingdom and took control of Bithynia. Bithynia served as a buffer state between Rome and Pontus; feeling threatened Mithridates marched his armies westwards and invade Roman territory.

The Senate responded by sending the consuls Lucius Licinius Lucullus and Marcus Aurelius Cotta to deal with the Pontic threat. The plan was for Cotta to tie down Mithridates's fleet, while Lucullus attacked by land. Cotta stationed his fleet at Chalcedon, while Lucullus planned to march through Phrygia with the intention of invading Pontus. Lucullus had not advanced far when news came through that Mithridates had made a rapid march westward, attacked and defeated Cotta at the Battle of Chalcedon, and was now besieging him. Leaving Cotta under siege in Chalcedon, Mithidates moved on and started taking cities in Bithynia. Lucullus marched north and caught the Mithridatic army off guard besieging Cyzicus, he conducted a very effective counter-siege, blockading the Mithridatic army on the Cyzicus peninsula and let famine and disease do his work for him. The Mithridatic army eventually broke through the blockade and tried to withdraw back to Pontus, Lucullus pursued them inflicting major losses on the Mithridatic forces at the battles of the Rhyndacus and the Granicus rivers.

== Prelude ==
After defeating the Mithridatic land forces at the Siege of Cyzicus and the battles of the Rhyndacus and the Granicus, Lucullus moved to the Troad and the Hellespont to raise a fleet. He knew he had to defeat the Pontic navy before he could move on Pontus itself. Here was informed that thirteen Mithridatic ships were headed to Lemnos. Lucullus was able to quickly mobilize and capture all 13 ships and execute Isidorus, the Pontic Admiral. Lucullus was then informed that the mass of the naval force was continuing towards Lemnos.

== Battle ==
Once again, quickly mobilizing his fleet, he overtook the combined fleet of the Mithridatic admiral Marcus Marius (or Varius), Alexander the Paphlagonian and Dionysius the Eunuch, near Lemnos. The Mithridatic commanders choose not to fight a sea battle, but instead defend against the Roman fleet off the coast of Lemnos; they drew up their ships on the beach and fought from their decks. Lucullus occupied his opponents attention with part of his fleet while secretly landing a contingent of troops on the other side of the island, when these made it across they attacked the Mitrhidatic forces from behind. The Romans captured or sunk 32 ships.

== Aftermath ==
The next day the Romans found the three admirals hiding in a cave on the island. Dionysius had poisoned himself, Alexander was taken captive and preserved to walk in Lucullus's triumphal procession, while Marius/Varius was executed. Like Sertorius, Marius/Varius at some point had lost an eye; when Lucullus gave the order to track down enemy survivors, he specified that no one-eyed men should be killed, so that he could personally oversee the renegade's death: "Lucullus wished Marius/Varius to die under the most shameful insults." Lucullus sent letters with garland to the Roman Senate declaring his victory and was recognized with significant accolades before joining the forces against Mithridates in the Bosporus.
