= Battle of Cabira =

Battle

- Part of the Third Mithridatic War
Date	72 BC
Location	Cabira (modern-day Niksar, Tokat, Turkey)
Result	Roman victory

Belligerents
Roman Republic	Kingdom of Pontus

Commanders and leaders
Lucius Licinius Lucullus	Mithridates VI of Pontus

Strength
Three legions and an unknown number of auxiliaries: 20,000 infantry; 1,600–2,500 cavalry; Engaged: Unknown (probably ten cohorts)	44,000 men: 40,000 infantry; 4,000 cavalry; Engaged: 4,000 men (a mixed force of cavalry and infantry)

Casualties and losses
Unknown but a lot lighter than the Pontic losses	3,000

The Battle of Cabira was fought in 72 or 71 BC between forces of the Roman Republic under proconsul Lucius Licinius Lucullus and those of the Kingdom of Pontus under Mithridates VI. It was a decisive Roman victory.

== Background ==
Rome had already fought two major conflicts with King Mithridates of Pontus; the so called First and Second Mithridatic Wars. During the first war, after taking the Roman province of Asia, Mithridates had slaughtered 80,000 Roman and other Italian civilians (called Asian Vespers), setting the stage was set for another conflict with Rome. When, in 74 BC, the Kingdom of Bithynia was bequeathed to the Roman Republic after the death of King Nicomedes IV of Bithynia, matters came to a head. Mithridates, anticipating a war with Rome, had invaded the country in 73 BC, defeating the proconsul Marcus Aurelius Cotta, the Roman governor of Bithynia, in battle and besieging him in the city of Chalcedon. Lucullus, Cotta's consular partner, had also anticipated war and had used his influence to get the command against Mithridates, he had also obtained the proconsular governorship of the Roman province of Cilicia from which he wanted to invade Pontus. Lucullus had just arrived in Roman Asia when he got word of Cotta's plight. After taking command of all Roman forces in Asia Minor, he marched his army north to relieve Cotta, who was still besieged at Chalcedon.

Mithridates left Cotta under siege at Chalcedon and headed westward to the city of Cyzicus, then allied to Rome, which he hoped to take before Lucullus arrived. After assembling an army and a war fleet Lucullus marched north and established a counter-siege trapping Mithridates's army on the Cyzicus peninsula. He also successfully mounted a naval expedition against Mithridates's navy in the Black Sea; defeating Marcus Varius, Mithridates's naval commander, off Lemnos. The Siege of Cyzicus turned out to be a spectacular success; the Romans blockaded and starved the numerically superior Pontic army. Mithridates, having failed to take the city before the onset of winter, was forced to withdraw. Of the 300,000 men who had set out for Bithynia only 20,000 effective troops made their way back to Pontus. Mithridates occupied Heraclea Pontica, blocking the northern land route into Pontus. Lucullus, not wanting to conduct another lengthy siege, left Heraclea to Cotta and prepared to invade Pontus by means of Galatia.

== Prelude ==
In 72 BC, while his colleague Cotta moved on Heraclea, Lucullus marched his army through Galatia and into Pontus. The Galatians were only too happy to supply the Romans because they disliked Mithridates and were keen to see the Roman legions pass through their country without being plundered. Once Lucullus was in the Pontic heartland he let his troops plunder the rich and fertile kingdom. Mithridates could do nothing to stop the despoiling of his lands, for he had to rebuild his army. He eventually assembled 40,000 men (including 4,000 cavalry) near Cabira and waited for Lucullus. Eventually, Lucullus made his way towards Cabira where, in an initial skirmish against Mithridates's forces, he suffered a setback and had to withdraw. This was followed by several further skirmishes and even an assassination attempt on Lucullus.

== Battle ==
Lucullus's supply lines now came north from Cappadocia, a Roman ally to the south of Pontus. A heavily armed supply convoy, escorted by no less than ten cohorts of infantry, under the command of the legate Sornatius was attacked by the Pontic cavalry. The Romans held off the attack inflicting terrible losses on the Pontic horsemen. When a second supply convoy, also heavily armed, under the command of Marcus Fabius Hadrianus made for Lucullus's camp Mithridates decided to use a combined arms (infantry and cavalry) force. Some 4,000 Pontic cavalry and infantry swept on the convoy; however, the Romans realized the narrow valley at the scene limited the effectiveness of their opponents' cavalry, so they counter-attacked and wiped out half the attacking force.

Mithridates sought to conceal the extent of the disaster from his army. Unfortunately for the Pontic king, Hadrianus marched by his camp in full battle array, complete with the spoils of his victory. The king's reputation must have suffered from being caught in this deception. The Pontic army was unsettled and there was talk about a retreat being in order.

This is when Mithridates decided to cut his losses and flee. The disorder caused by Mithridates's preparations to depart the area led to the complete disintegration of his army. Lucullus saw what was happening and ordered his army to fall on the fleeing forces. The Romans reached the camp, slew everyone who had remained there, and started looting.

== Aftermath ==
The battle was another turning point in the war against Mithridates and forced him to withdraw from his kingdom, nearly penniless, and seek shelter with his ally, his son-in-law Tigranes of Armenia. Before fleeing from Pontus Mithridates ordered one of his eunuchs, Bacchus, to make his way to the royal palace and see to the deaths of the king's sisters, wives and concubines. Lucullus continued the ongoing sieges throughout Pontus and organized it as a new Roman province, while Appius Claudius was sent to find Armenian allies and demand Mithridates from Tigranes. Tigranes refused, stating he would prepare for war against the Republic. In 69 BC Lucullus marched his legions into Armenia in pursuit of Mithridates.
