= Siege of Heraclea =

71 BCE siege

- Part of the Third Mithridatic War
Date	72–71 BC
Location	Heraclea Pontica, Bithynia (modern-day Karadeniz Ereğli, Zonguldak, Turkey) 41°17′5″N 31°24′53″E
Result	Roman victory

Belligerents
Roman Republic	Kingdom of Pontus

Commanders and leaders
Marcus Aurelius Cotta; Gaius Valerius Triarius	Connacorex

Strength
Unknown	4,000 men (Mithridatic garrison)
- Location within Turkey

The siege of Heraclea (72–71 BC) was a military investment of the city of Heraclea Pontica during the Third Mithridatic War. The siege was conducted by the Roman proconsul Marcus Aurelius Cotta (by land) and the legate Gaius Valerius Triarius (by sea). They were besieging the adherents of Mithridates of Pontus, who held the city for the Pontic king. Heraclea was located on the strategically important northern land route into the kingdom of Pontus and had been taken and garrisoned by Mithridates on his retreat from the Siege of Cyzicus. The 4,000-man strong Mithridatic garrisoned was commanded by Connacorex, one of the king's generals, and held out for almost two years. After taking Heraclea, the Romans plundered the city extensively.

== Background ==
After his defeat at the hands of Lucius Cornelius Sulla during the First Mithridatic War (89-85 BC) Mithridates had rebuilt his power and armies. In 74 BC, Nicomedes IV the king of Bithynia died, the Romans claimed he had left them his kingdom in his will and took control of Bithynia. Bithynia served as a buffer state between Rome and Pontus; feeling threatened Mithridates marched his armies westwards and invade Roman territory.

The Senate responded by sending the consuls Lucius Licinius Lucullus and Marcus Aurelius Cotta to deal with the Pontic threat. The plan was for Cotta to tie down Mithridates's fleet, while Lucullus attacked by land. Cotta stationed his fleet at Chalcedon, while Lucullus planned to march through Phrygia with the intention of invading Pontus. Lucullus had not advanced far when news came through that Mithridates had made a rapid march westward, attacked and defeated Cotta at the Battle of Chalcedon, and was now besieging him. Leaving Cotta under siege in Chalcedon, Mithidates moved on and started taking cities in Bithynia. Lucullus marched north and caught the Mithridatic army off guard besieging Cyzicus, he conducted a very effective counter-siege, blockading the Mithridatic army on the Cyzicus peninsula and let famine and disease do his work for him.

== Prelude ==
Mithridates escaped the counter-siege by sea during a storm filled night. On his way back to Pontus he took the city of Heraclea Pontica by subterfuge. He garrisoned 4,000 of his men under general Connacorex in the city to ensure its loyalty.

== Siege ==
After hearing about the situation at Heraclea, Lucullus changed his plans and decided to march into Pontus via the southern route through Galatia and leave Heraclea to Cotta while Lucullus's legate Triarius would confront Mithridates's naval forces. Cotta marched on Heraclea and began to lay siege to the city, despite his efforts he met with limited success. Eventually, Triarius arrived with naval support to aid Cotta in his operations.

Menchares, one of the sons of Mithridates and his governor of the Bosporian Kingdom, supplied Heraclea and its defenders from his dominions north of the Black Sea. Unfortunately for Mithridates, Menchares decided to abandon his father's cause and started negotiations with Lucullus. In exchange for the status of 'Friend and Ally' he halted his supply shipments.

Connacorex, Mithridates's commander, eventually decided to betray his king and hand the city over to the Romans. Connacorex did not trust Cotta so he started negotiations with Triarius whom he considered more trustworthy. The plan was apparently common knowledge in Heraclea –Connacorex had deceived the Heracleans by telling them he had received word that Mithridates and Tigranes (his ally) were on their way and would soon drive the Romans out. Connacorex then escaped by sea, Triarius letting him through his naval blockade, and the Romans sailed into the harbour. Triarius's troops started to loot the city, those Heracleans who escaped the atrocities made their way to Cotta's camp and apprised him of the situation. There was nearly a civil war as Cotta's men felt cheated out of their glory and plunder. The Roman land army entered the city as well and joined in on the plundering. Cotta even ransacked the content of sacred precincts and temples, including a statue of Heracles.

== Aftermath ==
After the sack of Heraclea, Cotta dismissed his allies, sent his own troops to reinforce Lucullus in Pontus, and returned to Rome. Some of his ships sunk under the weight of the stolen treasures. Triarius went in pursuit of Connacorex, who had captured Tius and Amastris; he was eventually allowed to flee, with the Romans taking the cities without a fight.

== Sources ==
The following titles were used in the composition of this article.

=== Bibliography ===
- Anthon, Charles & Smith, William, A New Classical Dictionary of Greek and Roman Biography, Mythology and Geography, 1860.
- Thomas Rice Holmes, The Roman Republic and the Founder of the Empire, Vol. I, 1923
- Thomas Robert Shannon Broughton, The Magistrates of the Roman Republic, II, 1952.
- Philip Matyszak, Mithridates the Great: Rome's Indomitable Enemy, 2008.
- Lee Fratantuono, Lucullus: The Life and Campaigns of a Roman Conqueror, 2017.

=== Ancient sources ===
- Appian, Mithridatic Wars.
- Memnon of Heraclea, History of Heraclea.
- Plutarch, Parallel Lives: Life of Lucullus.
