= Battle of the Rhyndacus (73 BC) =

Battle of the Third Mithridatic War

- Part of Third Mithridatic War
Date	73 BC
Location	Rhyndacus River (modern-day Mustafakemalpaşa River, Bursa, Turkey)
Result	Roman victory

Belligerents
Roman Republic	Pontus

Commanders and leaders
Lucius Licinius Lucullus	Mithridates VI of Pontus

Strength
10 cohorts (3,000–5,000 legionaries) and an unknown number of cavalry and auxiliaries	Unknown but probably the bulk of the cavalry and most of the wounded

Casualties and losses
Unknown (probably light)	15,000 men 6,000 horses

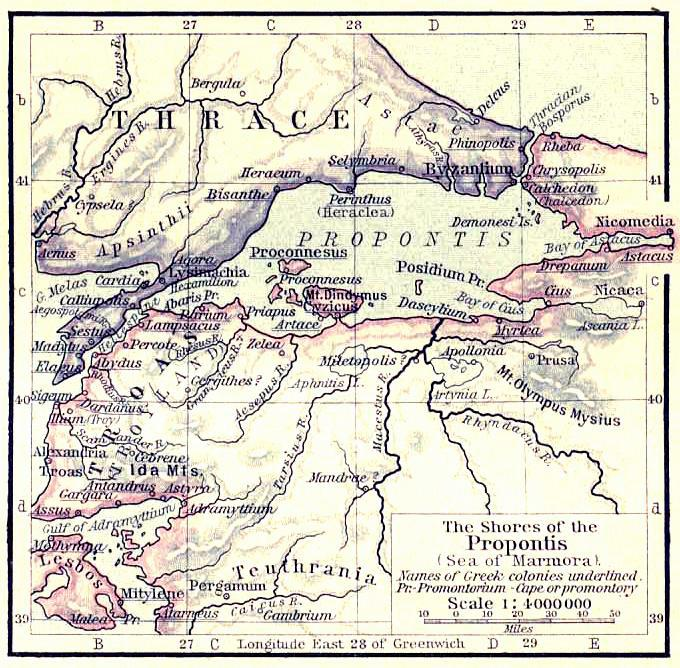
Map of the Sea of Marmara (Propontis), showing Cyzicus and the Rhyndacus, Aesepus and Granicus Rivers.

The Battle of the Rhyndacus occurred in 73 BC between a Roman Republican force under the command of the proconsul Lucius Licinius Lucullus and a division of the army of Mithridates VI of Pontus as part of the Third Mithridatic War. The Romans were victorious.

Lucullus, based in Cilicia, had foregone his planned invasion of Pontus from the south to come north and rescue his colleague, proconsul Marcus Aurelius Cotta, whom Mithridates had besieged at Cyzicus on the Sea of Marmara. Lucullus's army caught the Pontic army off guard and lay an effective counter-siege, trapping the Mithridatic army on the Cyzicus peninsula.

With the onset of winter and running low on supplies, Mithridates decided to send his sick, his wounded, and his cavalry east into Bithynia. The Pontic column was commanded by Neoptolemus, who was the brother of Archelaus. In the middle of a snowstorm, Lucullus met these forces with ten cohorts along the banks of the Rhyndacus. The Romans had a small advance guard of auxiliaries and cavalry on the opposite bank of the river. The combined Roman forces attacked. The Pontic forces turned to defend themselves. The battle was hard, and the Pontic forces fought bravely, but were unable to withstand the pressure of the Roman attack. Plutarch and Appian record 15,000 men and 6,000 horses as being captured during the battle.

The disaster at the Rhyndacus combined with the famine and plague which had struck his main army forced Mithridates to completely abandon his position, sailing north while his army marched overland. Lucullus once again routed them at the confluence of the Aesepus and Granicus Rivers, slaughtering many.
