= Mithridatic Wars =

Conflicts between Rome and Pontus, 88–63 BC

- Part of the Roman–Greek wars
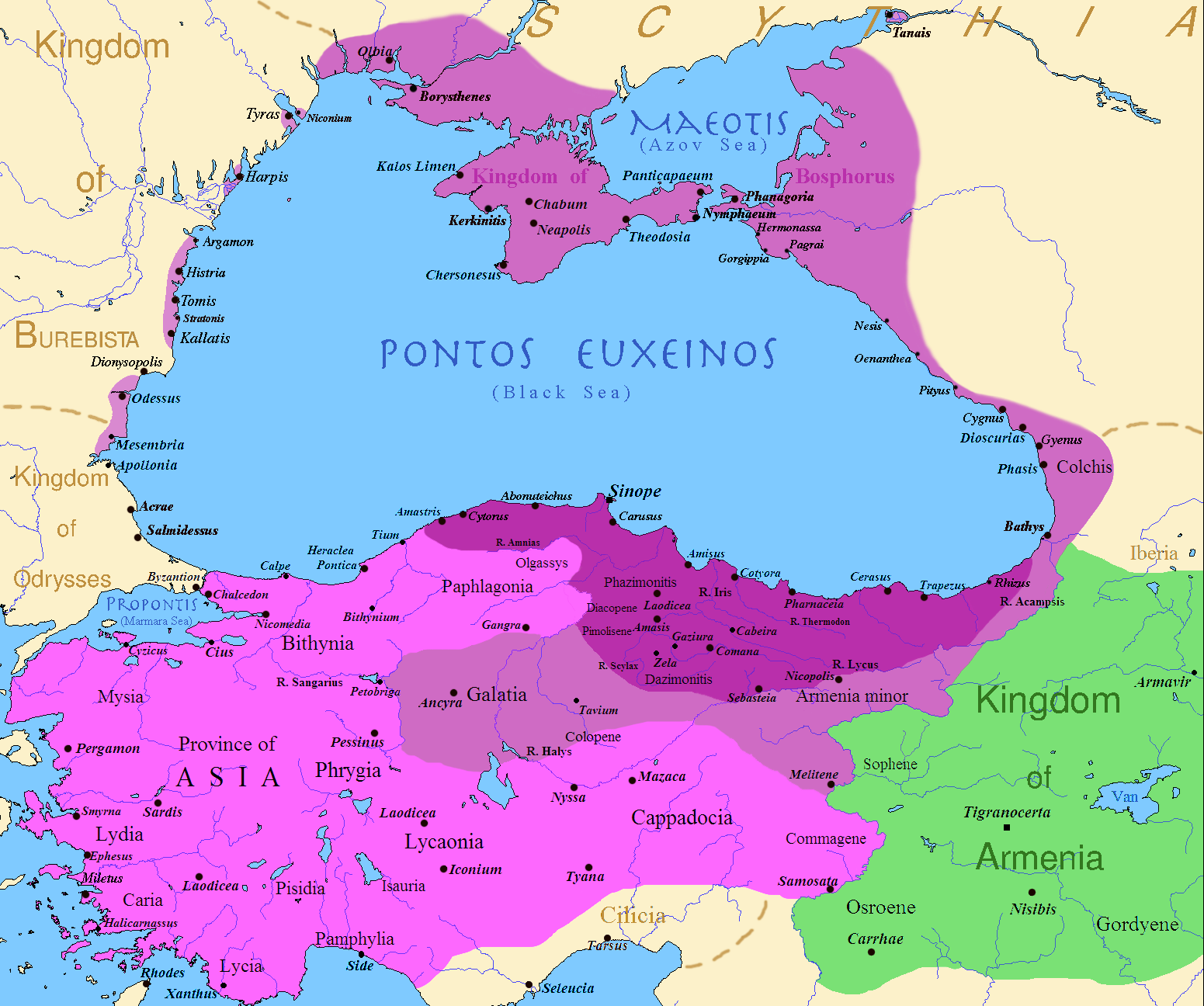
- Map of the Kingdom of Pontus
Date	88–63 BC
Location	Eastern Mediterranean
Result	Roman victory
Territorial changes	Pontus and Syria become Roman provinces; Judea becomes a client state of Rome

Belligerents
Roman Republic	Kingdom of Pontus
Clients/allies: Bithynia; Rhodes; Galatia; Cyzicus	Clients/allies: Kingdom of Armenia; Kingdom of Iberia; Caucasian Albania; Sarmatians

Commanders and leaders
Sulla; Lucullus; Pompeius; Manius Aquillius †; Lucius Licinius Murena; Marcus Aurelius Cotta; Gaius Flavius Fimbria (executed); Nicomedes IV	Mithridates; Tigranes the Great; Artoces of Iberia; Oroeses of Albania; Archelaus; Neoptolemus; Arcathius; Dorylaeus; Aristion; Marcus Marius

The Mithridatic Wars were three conflicts fought between the Roman Republic and the Pontic kingdom of Mithridates VI Eupator. Fought across Greece and Asia Minor, the wars started in 88 BC and, while intermittent, only concluded with Mithridates' death in 63. The final settlement in 63 saw the Romans annex Pontus and Syria while also establishing a number of client kingdoms in Asia Minor.

Starting in 88 BC in the aftermath of the Asiatic Vespers, the first war was conducted by Lucius Cornelius Sulla, alongside and independent of Marian generals also assigned to the war. They were mainly in Greece and mostly concluded in 85 BC with the Treaty of Dardanos, expelling Mithridates from the Aegean and forcing him to give up occupied territories in western Asia Minor. The second conflict lasted a few years in the late 80s BC and ended inconclusively.

The third conflict started in 73 and only ended in 63 BC. Against Mithridates the main Roman commanders were Lucius Licinius Lucullus and Pompey. Invading Roman Asia to forestall the Roman inheritance of Bithynia, Roman successes by 69 had forced Mithridates to flee to Armenia; with the Armenians refusing to hand the Pontic king over and joining the war, Lucullus led an invasion of Armenia until 66 when he was replaced in command by Pompey. Pompey forced the Armenians to capitulate and invaded Syria but Mithridates fled to Crimea. There, facing a revolt by one of his sons, Mithridates killed himself.

Pompey's eastern settlements after the third war saw Rome annex Pontus (it became part of provincial Bithynia) and annex Syria. It also established a network of client kingdoms on the eastern Anatolian plateau partially from portions of the dismantled Armenian Empire. The two-and-a-half-decade effort had drawn Rome much more deeply into the eastern Mediterranean and committed it to a lasting presence. Provincial policy in Rome permanently shifted towards imperial exploitation, with large portions of Anatolia coming under Roman taxation for the first time, with the concomitant stationing of large garrisons to compel compliance with collections.

== Background ==
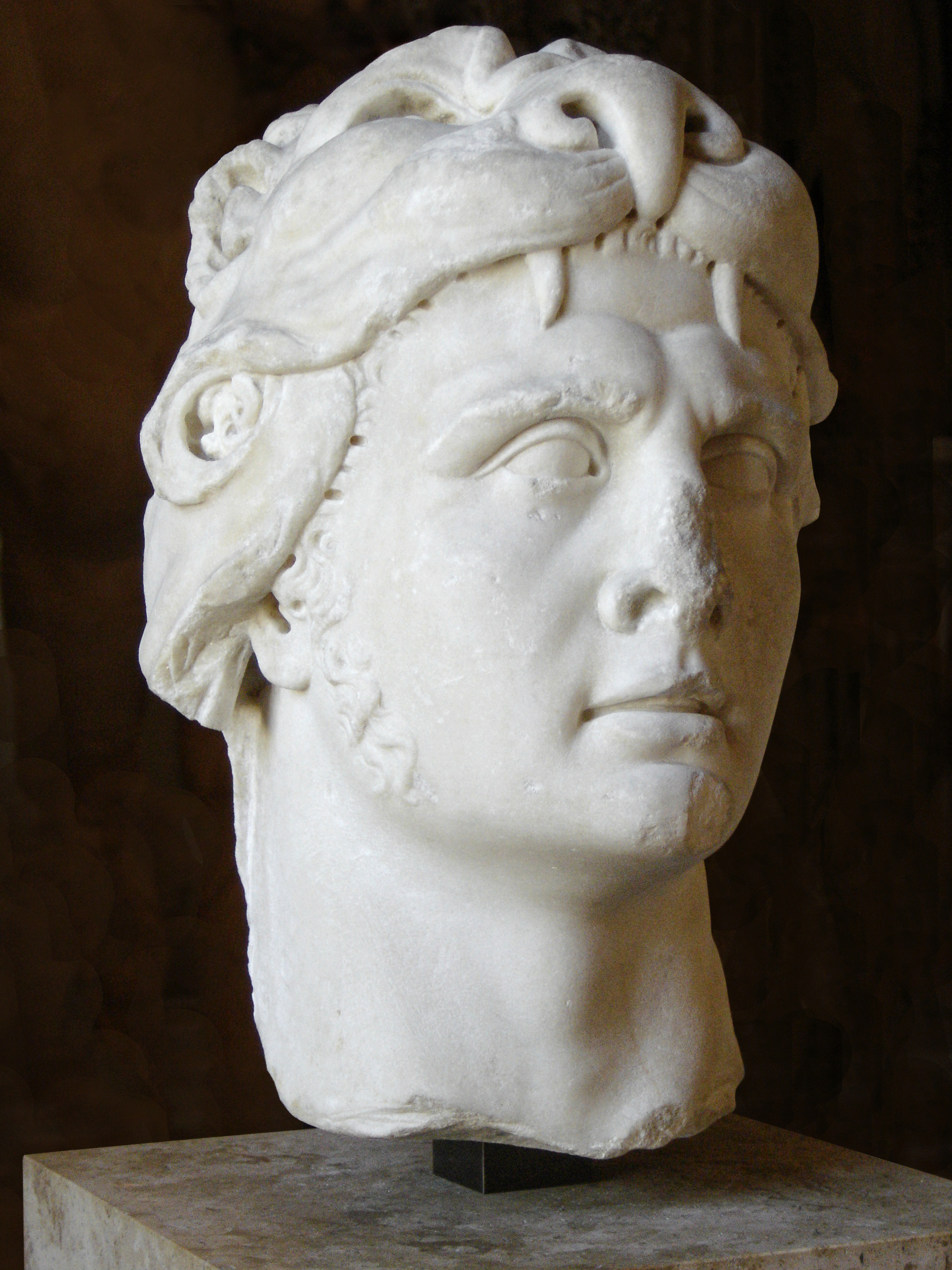
1st century AD head of Mithridates depicted as Heracles. Today in the Louvre.

The accession of Mithridates VI Eupator to the throne of the Pontic kingdom c. 113 BC in a coup saw him imprison his younger brother Chrestus and mother Laodice. The Romanophile policy of his father had secured for Pontus substantial territories in Phrygia but even though this alignment had continued through Laodice's rule as regent, Rome had stripped Pontus of those lands in 119 or 116. Ambitious but initially wary of Rome, Mithridates concentrated his efforts to his north and east (away from Roman territory), accepting hegemony over parts of Armenia and then campaigning across the Black Sea to take Crimea.

Roman attitudes towards Pontic expansion were initially indifferent. But after Mithridates, along with Nicomedes III of Bithynia, invaded and partitioned Paphlagonia in 108/7 BC the Romans sent envoys demanding them to give up their conquests; rebuffed, but without any mandate for Roman intervention, nothing was done. Also intervening in Cappadocia to install his son as Ariarathes IX c. 102 BC, Mithridates sent envoys to Rome seeking recognition of his conquests. Some in Rome reacted negatively: Lucius Appuleius Saturninus apparently insulted the Pontic envoys; Gaius Marius apparently nursed designs on Pontic territories. When Cappadocia revolted against Pontic rule c. 97 BC the Roman Senate heard conflicting evidence about the territory's inheritance and, dismissing his claims, forced Mithridates to withdraw from the kingdom by decree. Lucius Cornelius Sulla, propraetorian governor of Cilicia (dated by A N Sherwin-White to 94 BC), then installed Ariobarzanes I as king.

An alliance with Armenia from 96 or 95 BC, secured by marriage, strengthened Mithridates considerably in Asia Minor. With a weakened Bithynia in the aftermath of the death of Nicomedes III of Bithynia and Roman distraction by the revolt of their Italian allies, Mithridates overthrew the pro-Roman ruler of Cappadocia in 91 or 90 BC before expelling the Nicomedes' homonymous heir from the kingdom. The Senate demanded the restoration of both monarchs to Cappadocia; Mithridates, building up forces in Pontus and seeking alliances (or at least neutrality) from neighbouring eastern powers, eventually complied. But when the two restored monarchs were unable to pay for Roman support, the Roman commissioners under Manius Aquillius at their own initiative urged them to invade Pontus, misreading Mithridates' accessions to Roman demands as weakness. Mithridates responded by again driving Ariobarzanes out of Cappadocia and – after his envoy was arrested for delivering a veiled threat – declared war.

== Wars ==
=== First war ===
The state of the eastern Mediterranean on the eve of the First Mithridatic War, with Roman Asia and its client states spanning east towards Pontus (itself on the southern coast of the Black Sea).

In the summer of 89 BC Rome was still distracted fighting its Italian allies in the Social War. Mithridates for his part had occupied Cappadocia and, that year, extended his occupations to Phrygia, Bithynia, and parts of Ionia. Defeating the Roman garrisons of Asia under Aquillius, subduing their client kings, and overrunning the Roman province of Asia, he extended his control in early 88 to the western coast of Asia Minor. With the Senate and assemblies voting for war at Rome, he responded by perpetrating the Asiatic Vespers, having all Romans and Italians in the occupied territories (some 80,000) massacred en masse with their properties seized and split with the killers. The deaths of so many businessmen and the seizure of their properties caused a financial panic in Rome.

After unsuccessful sieges of Rhodes and Patara in Lycia, Mithridates was called to Athens: Aristion, elected commander-in-chief (Ancient Greek: strategos epi ton hoplon), allied with Mithridates to take the island Delos and offered naval support. Much of the rest of Greece also capitulated, including the Peloponnesian Achaeans and Spartans and most of Boeotia. Roman resistance centred on provincial Macedonia which was able to hold off Mithridates and his allies until proconsul Sulla appeared with his consular army.

Sulla appeared in Thessaly and marched south overland to Attica. In Boeotia he forced Thebes and other cities to again change sides. Arriving in Attica he invested Athens and the Athenian port Piraeus. Mithridates sent a large army along the northern Aegean through Macedonia to relieve Athens, but the city surrendered on 1 March 86 BC. Some weeks later the Pontic garrison at Piraeus boarded ships to join the Pontic army in Macedonia and the Athenian acropolis fell. Aristion and his followers were executed but the city at large was spared in recognition of its great antiquity. That summer two battles followed in Boeotia – those of Chaeronea and Orchomenus – which saw the Pontic forces obliterated by the Romans with, according to Sulla's memoirs, minimal Roman losses.

Roman forces were, however, not united. With the Cinnan regime in power at Rome, they assigned consul Lucius Valerius Flaccus with an army to take over command from Sulla, who refused to relinquish his, forcing the two Roman armies to operate essentially independently. With Mithridates expeditionary forces destroyed, Sulla offered terms: Pontic withdrawal from Roman Asia and Paphlagonia along with restoration of the pre-war monarchs in Bithynia and Cappadocia. Mithridates also was to hand over seventy or eighty ships and an indemnity of some two or three thousand talents. For his part Sulla would ensure Mithridates would henceforth be treated as a Roman ally. Flaccus' army, which killed him in favour of his legate Gaius Flavius Fimbria, continued east into Asia Minor with successes, almost capturing Mithridates at Pitane, before he escaped by the inaction of Sulla's quaestor Lucius Licinius Lucullus. Mithridates sued for peace with Sulla, meeting at Dardanus in the Dardanelles, in autumn 85 BC where he accepted Sulla's terms. Fimbria's army then surrendered to Sulla, with Fimbria killing himself shortly thereafter, and then served to garrison Asia while Sulla arranged a settlement.

The Treaty of Dardanos so reached was remarkably lenient on Mithridates. This was almost certainly because Sulla desired a free hand so that he could launch an invasion of Italy and destroy the Cinnan regime at Rome. Treatment of the Asian provincials was not so light-handed: with substantial increases in Roman revenues exacted from the defeated or unfaithful provincial communities. Harsh indemnities were also forced from the Asian cities, who for the time being paid Sulla.

The terms of the treaty with Mithridates were not at the time public, with Sulla unwilling to publicise what was essentially a withdrawal for convenience. Taking a long delay to avoid charges of neglecting Roman interests in the east, in spring 83 Sulla's armies boarded ships for Brundisium to start civil war. Even though Sulla was victorious in the civil war and his actions (including the proscriptions) were formally ratified by a cowed assembly after his victory over his fellow citizens in 82 BC, the Dardanus pact was not included.

=== Second war ===
Lucius Licinius Murena was propraetorian governor of Asia in 83 BC. In violation of the private peace concluded with Sulla, Murena attacked Mithridates that year on the basis that Mithridates was interfering in the restoration of Ariobarzanes to Cappadocia and preparing forces to resume an offensive against Rome. His operations in 83 BC largely proceeded without opposition, but during the last of three large raids into Pontic territory, Murena's forces were defeated in 82 with serious losses. The next year Aulus Gabinius arrived as envoy from Sulla to order him to cease hostilities; Gabinius also organised Mithridates' withdrawal from Cappadocia by means of a marriage pact, avoiding further fighting.

For his part, Murena celebrated a triumph over Mithridates at Rome in 81, which A N Sherwin-White in the Cambridge Ancient History calls "unearned". This award of a triumph may have been motivated by domestic concerns. Both Sulla and Murena triumphed over Mithridates in 81, suggesting that Sulla may have been attempting to paint Mithridates as subdued even when facts on the ground and the terms of his private peace with Pontus showed otherwise.

The events showed Roman policy under Sulla was largely non-expansionist, centred on retaining the existing international regime in Asia Minor with Mithridates suitably cowed as a client state. Opposition to this policy in the Senate and elsewhere is however evident: Murena was able to justify his war against Mithridates on the grounds that the Treaty of Dardanos was not anywhere written and therefore did not exist; the Senate, shortly after Sulla's death in 78 BC, refused to ratify it even though Mithridates pushed hard via intermediaries to secure its recognition.

=== Third war ===
The proximate cause of the third war was the Roman annexation of Bithynia in the aftermath of the death of its king, Nicomedes IV, with a will that in the absence of legitimate heirs left it to Rome. The Senate, ignoring the pleas of one of the royal bastards for rulership, instructed the Asian proconsul to take it as a province and, in expectation for war, reassigned the consuls of 74 (Lucius Licinius Lucullus and Marcus Aurelius Cotta) to the closest provinces: Lucullus received Asia and Cilicia while Cotta received Bithynia along with a fleet. Arguing that the failure to ratify the Dardanus peace (even if observed de facto) meant that the war still continued and responding to Mithridates' mobilisation, they departed for the east late in the year.

==== Lucullus' campaigns ====
Fighting started in the spring of 73 BC. While Lucullus intended to march overland through Phrygia and Galatia to Pontus, Mithridates struck first and invaded Bithynia, defeating Cotta in the Sea of Marmara near Chalcedon and besieging him there. Lucullus rushed to Cotta's relief while Mithridates besieged the large port city of Cyzicus. Investing Mithridates' forces already investing Cyzicus, Lucullus was able to prevent the Pontic army – poorly supplied by sea and vulnerable from land – from capturing the city and, with winter approaching, forced Mithridates to abandon the siege and withdraw east. Refusing battle, Lucullus' strategy preserved his entire army and compelled Mithridates into the less favourable strategy of fighting in central Asia Minor where Roman advantages were greatest.

The next year, 72 BC, Lucullus slowly marched into Pontus with the intention of allowing Mithridates to concentrate troops which could then be forced into a large decisive battle. With Roman successes at sea under Cotta, Lucullus engaged and destroyed Mithridates' cavalry near Cabira and placed Mithridates on the defensive. The Pontic king withdrew east towards mountainous Lesser Armenia under heavy Roman harassment, leading to most of the Pontic army being destroyed and Mithridates' flight for refuge with the Armenians. Lucullus then spent much of 71 and 70 BC completing his conquest of Pontus, sacking Sinope and Amisus, and occupying Lesser Armenia. Sending Appius Claudius Pulcher as envoy to Armenia in 71, Lucullus demanded Mithridates be surrendered; however, with Appius' rude and overbearing behaviour, the Armenians delayed and late in 71 or early in 70 BC announced their refusal.

Lucullus, likely expecting the war was over, had requested the standard senatorial commission to help settle affairs in the newly conquered territories. But on their arrival in late 70 or early 69 they had found him launching directly into Armenia. The conflict started without authorisation from Rome against a polity with whom the Romans had previously had no formal relations. Possibly concerned with the political risk, he sought a quick and decisive victory. He won one on 7 October at Tigranocerta but was unable to capitalise on it – both Tigranes and Mithridates disappeared into the mountains of northern Armenia – due to the onset of winter.

The next year in 68 BC, succeeding in careful diplomacy to prevent the intervention of the Parthians, Lucullus marched into northern Armenia. Tigranes melted away into the mountains while Lucullus dealt with unease from his troops, who protested of the length and breadth of his campaigns, before withdrawing south and besieging Nisibis. The city unexpectedly fell by night attack and Lucullus there wintered. However, while Lucullus was in Armenia, Mithridates led a force west from Armenia into Pontus where he was able to raise substantial forces and defeat the Roman garrisons still dotting the Pontic countryside. At the Battle of Zela, Mithridates won a major victory against one of Lucullus' legates. Meanwhile, Lucullus' political fortunes were less favourable at Rome – early reports of his successes led to protests for the provinces to be placed back in the regular pool for governors – and the provinces of Asia and Cilicia were both reassigned from under him.

==== Pompey's campaigns ====
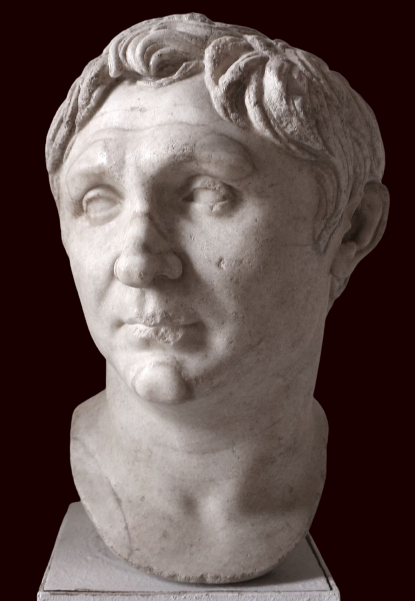
Marble head depicting Pompey. Pompey's campaigns finished the war on Mithridates, forcing his flight from Pontus and death in Crimea.

Unrest in Lucullus' troops continued to mount: the troops raised for the First Mithridatic War under Flaccus, and later Fimbria, had been in arms at this point for eighteen years and were clamouring for discharge. While unrest had quieted during his rush west to aid his legate before Zela, he was unable to arrive in time before the defeat. By the spring of 67, with his troops refusing to march east towards Tigranes, he was forced to withdraw into Cappadocia. There, he found that he had been replaced in command of Bithynia and Pontus by the consul Manius Acilius Glabrio in consequence of the lex Gabinia passed early that year. Taking advantage of Roman distraction, Mithridates recovered almost all of the Pontic kingdom and Tigranes booted out Ariobarzanes to occupy Cappadocia.

Mithridates' victory at Zela proved an opportunity for the general Pompey, at the time waging war on the pirates in the eastern Mediterranean, to secure the Pontic command for himself. One of his allies in the tribunate, Gaius Manilius, proposed a law early in 66 BC to transfer the command from Glabrio (who, having just arrived to Bithynia, had not yet relieved Lucullus of his command in Galatia) to Pompey. The lex Manilia passed, with the support many influential former consuls and senatorial luminaries, especially in light of the rapid successes Pompey had achieved against the pirates just that year. Also given the province of Cilicia, Pompey succeeded both Glabrio and Lucullus in command. In all, he was able to mobilise some 45,000 men: some from Lucullus' battered forces, some from fresh troops taken to Cilicia by his predecessor, and some from his campaign to suppress the Mediterranean pirates. Against him under Mithridates were some 33,000 men in Lesser Armenia, who in a series of poorly documented battles, were quickly defeated. With the military situation unfavourable, Tigranes concluded an alliance with Rome under duress and betrayed Mithridates; Mithridates, barred from Armenia, fled north into the Caucasus before finding refuge with his son in Crimea. He died by suicide shortly thereafter when his son Pharnaces staged a coup.

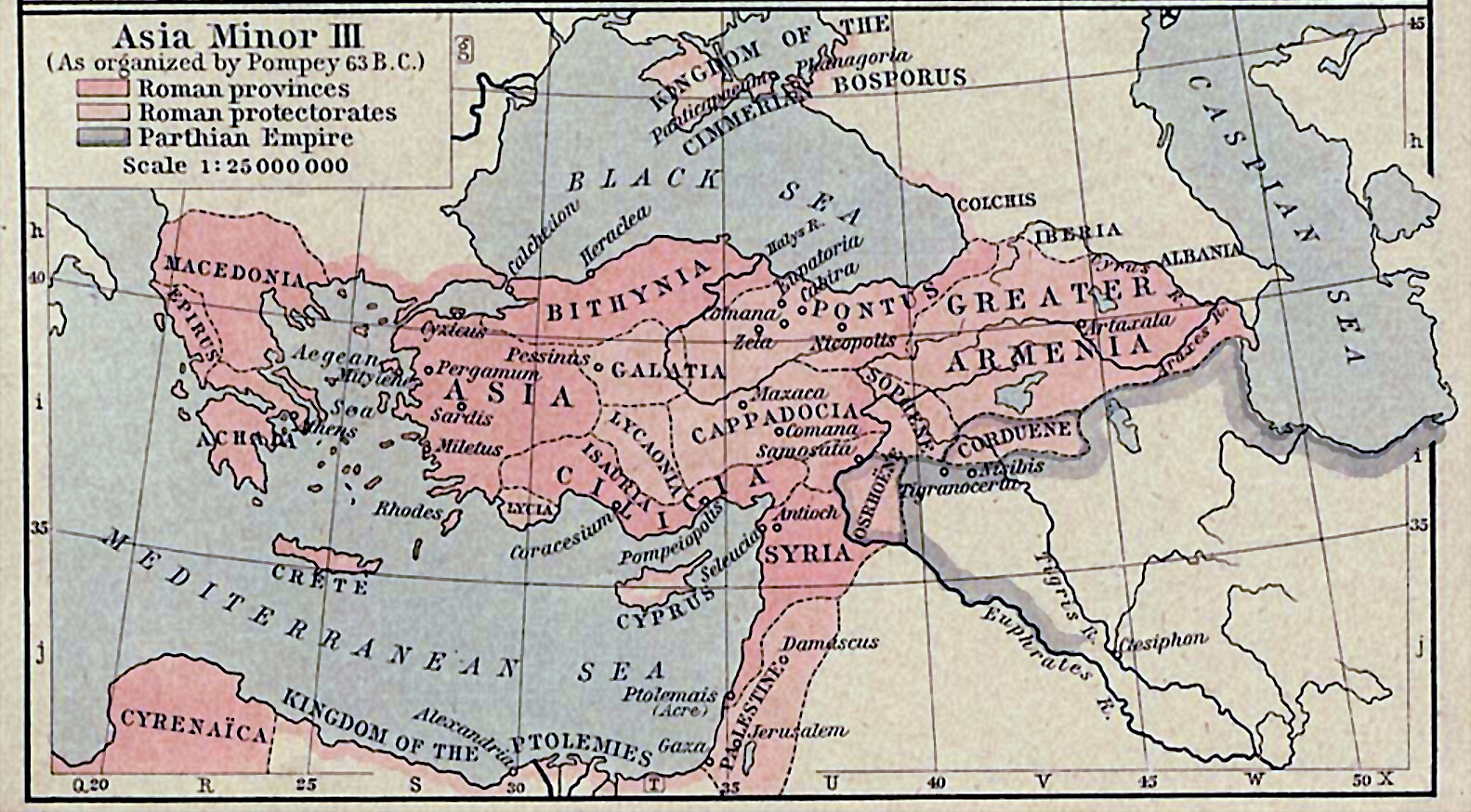
This 1911 map depicts the provinces and client states which Pompey organised in the east.

Tigranes' empire was reduced to its core, with Rome redistributing its outer regions to new client kings. Seeking to extend Roman control to its natural borders at the end of the eastern Anatolian plateau and possibly to pursue Mithridates, Pompey then campaigned against the tribes of Iberians and Albanians there. By the end of 65 BC he had completed these campaigns and extended Roman influence to the eastern edge of what had been the Armenian empire. Records are spotty for Pompey's activities for the following year. He likely spent much of it cataloguing Mithridates' treasuries dotted around Pontic territory, where in all more than 36,000 talents of gold and silver were found. Pompey then appears in Syria late in 64 BC, arriving to Antioch for the purpose of effecting an annexation in the aftermath of the collapse of the Seleucid Empire and to preclude any Parthian expansion to the Mediterranean. He then moved south into Hasmonean Judaea where, after abortive negotiations, he settled the dynastic conflict between Hyrcanus and Aristobulus in the former's favour, taking Jerusalem and its citadel.

When news of Mithridates' death reached Judaea, Pompey returned north to Pontus to settle affairs there and treat with Pharnaces. Pharnaces surrendered Mithridates' corpse, the men who had killed Manius Aquillius back in 88 BC, and other gifts. In exchange he was confirmed as king of Crimea and declared a friend of the Roman people. With ten days of thanksgiving declared at Rome for the victory by the Senate, Pompey then spent the winter of 63/62 settling affairs in the eastern provinces before departing for Italy in the spring of 62. Arriving at Brundisium in December and, mollifying fears that he would march his victorious army on Rome, he dismissed his men.

== Aftermath and impact ==
This image depicts Roman territory c. 60 BC. In the aftermath of the Mithridatic Wars, Roman territory stretched into central and eastern Anatolia and for the first time into the Levant.

Long delayed by popular opposition, Lucullus celebrated his triumph over Mithridates in 63 BC. Pompey after his return to Italy celebrated a triumph on 28–29 September 61 BC, but his military successes did not translate to political preeminence. Factional politics, especially opposition to Pompey's overweening political influence, alienated Pompey from many in the aristocracy, who painted the general as an opportunist who preyed on the hard-won successes of others. His inability to support a political movement with which to push forward his political ambitions, formal ratification of his eastern settlements, and land grants to his veterans in the years following led him eventually to form a political alliance with his former consular colleague Marcus Crassus and the rising politician Julius Caesar.

=== Territorial changes ===
In the aftermath of the Third Mithridatic War, Rome restored Ariobarzanes to the throne of Cappadocia, with extension of his kingdom to Phyrgia. Antiochus of Commagene to the north also received territorial spoils from the reduction of Armenia. The frontier of Roman client states in the aftermath of the settlement stretched to Armenia which fell under a loose Roman influence. Existing provincial Cilicia was expanded, with Syria adduced as a new province. Pontus was added to the existing province of Bithynia to form Bithynia and Pontus. Garrisons were scattered across these provinces, with two legions each in Cilicia and Syria; a garrison was also assigned to Bithynia and Pontus though evidence is scant. The client state system set up in the aftermath of the third war continued in parts at least until the early principate.

In the Roman provinces formerly controlled by Pontus, the direct rule of Pontic eparchs was replaced with municipal government on a Hellenic model with demos, boule, and plural magistrates. These new cities likely had restricted franchises along with a Roman-influenced council (essentially a municipal senate) selected by intermittent censors. The populations of these new provinces were also placed under tax, mainly under supervision of the publicani on the basis of contracts let in each province. In the reorganised territories the publicani paid the Roman state an advance before deferring their own collection to the local community which then self-organised tax collections for each locality. Major client states were exempted from formal taxation or tribute but smaller principalities paid some tribute to nearby provincial governors. The civic arrangements here made continued at least until the time of Trajan during the high empire, as attested by letters from Pliny. Taxation arrangements were more easily modified and in some cases Roman governors sought direct taxation, which generally had lower overheads, to mollify provincial unrest.

=== Roman provincial and imperial policy ===
The start of the Mithridatic wars showed that Roman attempts to keep a light permanent presence in Asia was insufficient to defend its interests from both foreign threats and provincial resistance. Rome's ability to impose its will and extract resources from the east in the late second century BC was founded mostly on its military reputation rather than an immediate presence, as the Senate was disinclined to expand Rome's eastern military commitments. Mithridates' ability to so quickly turn much of Asia Minor against Roman hegemony especially showed the inadequacy of the prewar Roman garrisons in the region.

Rome's efforts during the wars were driven by its interests in defending its revenues from the rich Asian provinces as well as its military reputation. Private investments by wealthy Italians were already growing by the late second century. These commercial contacts only grew in the aftermath Roman victory in the first war, especially since many Asian cities borrowed huge sums from Italian moneylenders to cover indemnities paid to Rome. In the aftermath of the first war, Roman exactions from the eastern provinces increased dramatically between indemnities paid by the defector Asian communities and the extension of Roman taxation to large parts of Asia Minor.

The importance of continued Roman hegemony in and imperial control of Asia Minor was not lost on the Senate or the people at Rome. Both supported repeated efforts in the 60s BC to increase Rome's military commitments. Such commitments were used to stiffen Rome's ability to exploit its eastern empire for tax and grain. While eastern provincial exploitation traces to the acquisition of Asia and Gracchan proposal to tax Asia to finance privileges at Rome, the Mithridatic military disruption triggered a permanent shift in Roman policy towards greater exploitation – and therefore military commitments – of the whole eastern empire.

== Bibliography ==
- Bosworth, A B; Wheatley, P V (1998). "The origins of the Pontic house". Journal of Hellenic Studies. 118: 155–164. doi:10.2307/632236. ISSN 0075-4269. JSTOR 632236.
- Briscoe, John (1985). Journal of Roman Studies. 75: 238–239. doi:10.2307/300669. ISSN 0075-4358. JSTOR 300669.
- Broughton, Thomas Robert Shannon (1952). The magistrates of the Roman republic. Vol. 2. New York: American Philological Association.
- Broughton, Thomas Robert Shannon (1986). The magistrates of the Roman republic. Vol. 3. Atlanta, GA: Scholars Press.
- Crook, John; et al., eds. (1994). The last age of the Roman republic, 146–43 BC. Cambridge Ancient History. Vol. 9 (2nd ed.). Cambridge University Press. ISBN 0-521-85073-8. OCLC 121060.
  - Hind, John G F. "Mithridates". In CAH^{2} 9 (1994), pp. 129–64.
  - Seager, Robin (1994a). "Sulla". In CAH^{2} 9 (1994), pp. 165–207.
  - Sherwin-White, A N. "Lucullus, Pompey, and the East". In CAH^{2} 9 (1994), pp. 229–73.
- Gruen, Erich (1995). The last generation of the Roman republic. Berkeley: University of California Press. ISBN 0-520-02238-6.
- McGing, B C (1984). "The date of the outbreak of the Third Mithridatic War". Phoenix. 38 (1): 12–18. doi:10.2307/1088085. ISSN 0031-8299. JSTOR 1088085.
- McGing, B C (2012). "Mithradates". Oxford Classical Dictionary (4th ed.). Oxford University Press. doi:10.1093/acrefore/9780199381135.013.4223.
- Morstein-Marx, Robert (1996). Hegemony to empire. University of California Press. ISBN 978-0-585-16038-2.
- Steel, Catherine (2013). The end of the Roman republic, 149 to 44 BC: conquest and crisis. Edinburgh History of Ancient Rome. Edinburgh University Press. ISBN 978-0-7486-1944-3.
