= Sornatia gens =

Ancient Roman family

The gens Sornatia was an obscure plebeian family at ancient Rome. Few members of this gens appear in history, of whom the most famous was a general of Lucullus during the Third Mithridatic War, but several others are known from inscriptions.

== Origin ==
The nomen Sornatius resembles other gentilicia formed using the suffix -atius, usually from cognomina ending in -as or -atis, derived from place names, or participles ending in -atus. However, there are no known corresponding surnames; there was, however, a town called Sornum in Dacia. There was also a rare gentile name Sornius, (Note: Lucius Sornius, a soldier buried at Salona in Dalmatia, and Titus Sornius L. f. Dexter, one of the quattuorviri with aedilician powers at Verona in Venetia and Histria, as well as an augur and flamen.) from which the nomen might have been derived.

== Members ==
This list includes abbreviated praenomina. For an explanation of this practice, see filiation.

- Sornatius, a physician quoted by Pliny the Elder. Sornatius is given as an authority for the proposition that those using a certain hair dye produced by rotting leeches in a leaden vessel full of vinegar should put oil in their mouths to prevent their teeth from blackening along with their hair.
- Gaius Sornatius C. f., a legate of the proconsul Lucius Licinius Lucullus during the Third Mithridatic War. In 72 BC, he inflicted a devastating defeat on the Pontic army, and nearly captured Mithridates. When Lucullus invaded Armenia in 69, he left Sornatius in charge of Pontus, with a force of six thousand soldiers. The following year, his soldiers mutinied, and refused to leave for Armenia, until shamed into doing so by a Roman defeat.
- Gaius Sornatius C. f., named in an inscription from Castrum Novum in Picenum.
- Gaius Sornatius C. f., a centurion primus pilus in the Legio X Fretensis, buried at Rome, with a monument from Sornatia Phiale.
- Sornatia Arecusa, together with her son, Gaius Sornatius Indus, dedicated a tomb at Rome for her husband of forty-three years, Quintus Lucretius Zeuxis, aged sixty.
- Gaius Sornatius Q. f. Q. n. Indus, together with his mother, Sornatia Arecusa, dedicated a tomb at Rome for his father, Quintus Lucretius Zeuxis.
- Sornatia Phiale, dedicated a monument at Rome to Gaius Sornatius, the centurion.
- Gaius Sornatius Plutus, together with Gaius Norbanus Amianthus, masters of a slave named Cedrus, named in an inscription from Rome.
- Gaius Sornatius Quartio, buried at Rome, with a monument from his sister, Sornatia.
- Titus Sornatius C. f. Sabinus, buried at Rome during the first century, in a sepulchre built by his mother, Anusia Tertia for herself and her son.

== See also ==
- List of Roman gentes

== Bibliography ==
- Gaius Plinius Secundus (Pliny the Elder), Historia Naturalis (Natural History).
- Lucius Mestrius Plutarchus (Plutarch), Lives of the Noble Greeks and Romans.
- Theodor Mommsen et alii, Corpus Inscriptionum Latinarum (The Body of Latin Inscriptions, abbreviated CIL), Berlin-Brandenburgische Akademie der Wissenschaften (1853–present).
- Dictionary of Greek and Roman Geography, William Smith, ed., Little, Brown and Company, Boston (1854).
- August Pauly, Georg Wissowa, et alii, Realencyclopädie der Classischen Altertumswissenschaft (Scientific Encyclopedia of the Knowledge of Classical Antiquities, abbreviated RE or PW), J. B. Metzler, Stuttgart (1894–1980).
- George Davis Chase, "The Origin of Roman Praenomina", in Harvard Studies in Classical Philology, vol. VIII, pp. 103–184 (1897).
- Paul von Rohden, Elimar Klebs, & Hermann Dessau, Prosopographia Imperii Romani (The Prosopography of the Roman Empire, abbreviated PIR), Berlin (1898).
- T. Robert S. Broughton, The Magistrates of the Roman Republic, American Philological Association (1952–1986).
