= Battle of Chalcedon =

The Battle of Chalcedon may refer to:

- Battle of Chalcedon (74 BC), a naval battle of the Third Mithradatic War
- Battle of Chrysopolis in 324 AD, in which Constantine I defeated his rival Licinius to become sole emperor of Rome
