= Marcus Marius (quaestor 76 BC) =

Roman quaestor and general

Marcus Marius was a quaestor of the Roman Republic in 76 BC and proquaestor under Quintus Sertorius's government in exile in Spain. Marius was sent by Sertorius to Mithradates of Pontus as an advisor and military commander in the Third Mithridatic War. He is named as or more likely confused with a Varius in Appian.

== Family and political connections ==
No connection has been established between this Marius and Gaius Marius or the other contemporary Marii of Arpinum. M. Marius is supposed to have arrived in Spain in the company of Perperna, but no further association is recorded with the man who was the prime instigator of Sertorius's assassination a few years later. Given that Marcus Marius was among the senators who fled Sulla, his politics are not likely to have been antithetical to those of the better-known Marian populares. A passage in Orosius implies, but does not directly state, that he was on the list of the proscribed. He was certainly a fugas (φυγάς), a fugitive or exile, in keeping with the "peculiar legal situation" of Sertorius's men, some of whom were proscripti, and others of whom were hostes publici, "public enemies." In both cases, their lives and property were forfeit, and their sons and grandsons lost the rights of citizenship, but the proscribed in addition had bounties on their heads.

== Mission to the East ==
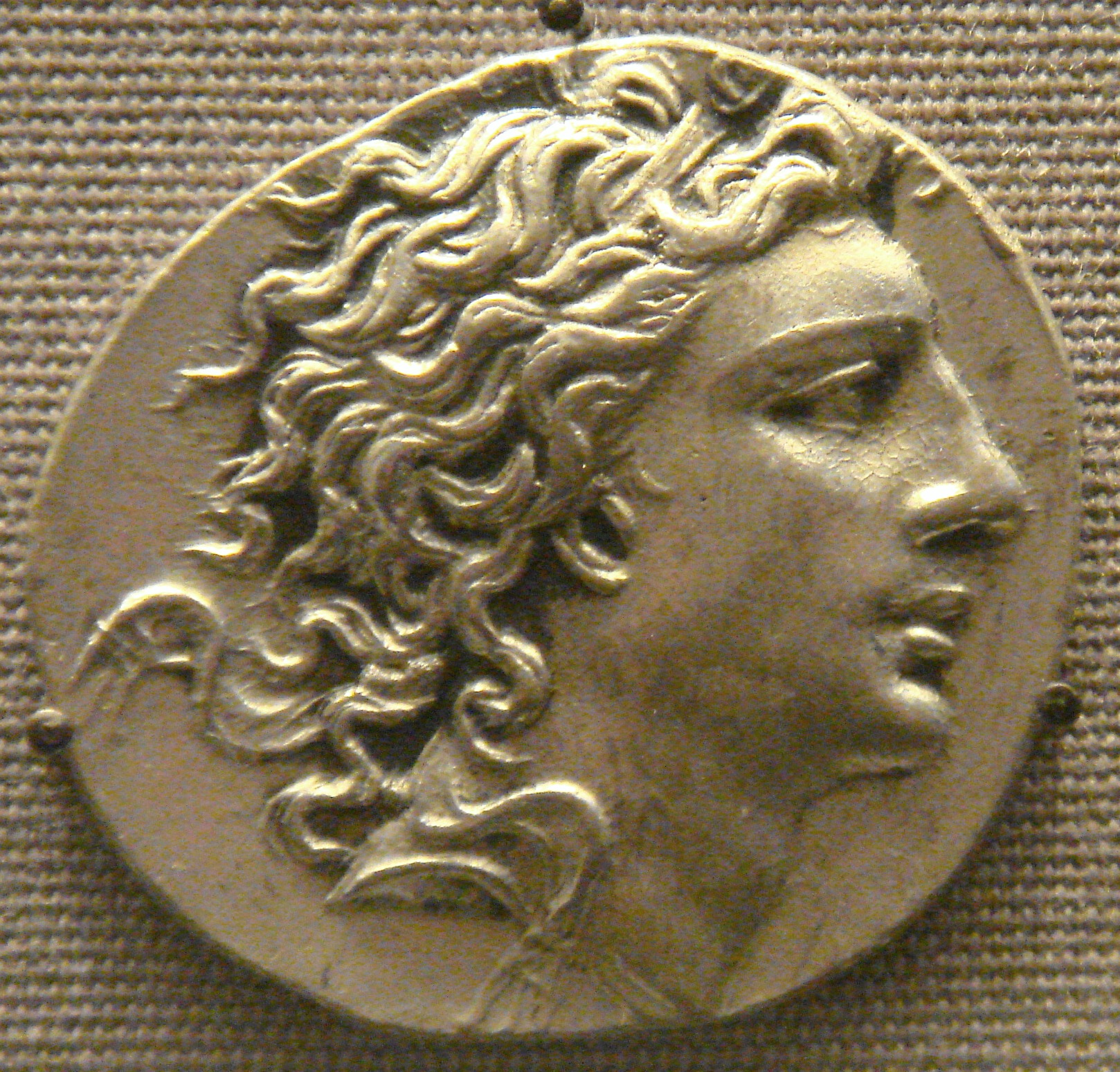
Coin of Mithradates VI

Sertorius sent Marcus Marius as a military advisor and his representative to Mithradates during the protracted negotiations between the two over an alliance. By 75 BC, Mithradates offered to recognize Sertorius as head of the Roman state, and sent aid in the form of 3,000 talents (72 million sesterces) and a fleet of 40 ships; in return, he asked that Sertorius recognize his claims in Anatolia. Sertorius reserved in his own name Rome's claim to Asia, already organized as a province and acquired — he insisted — legitimately, but he asserted no rights over Bithynia, Paphlagonia, Cappadocia, and Galatia; these, he said, "had nothing to do with the Romans."

Marius went East with troops. Bearing the fasces and axes, he entered at least two Asian cities and granted them and a number of others independent status and tax exemptions on behalf of the Sertorian government; in effect, he assumed possession of Asia with proconsular powers. His authority was held pro praetore, that is, under the auspices of Sertorius and without holding his own imperium. Plutarch calls him a stratêgos (στρατηγός), "general," rather than a praetor.

In Plutarch's view, the province welcomed the new regime, because it had been oppressed by Rome's tax collectors and contractors (publicani) and by the "rapacity and insolence" of the soldiers stationed there. Marius's policy is consistent with that of Sertorius in cultivating the goodwill of the provincials under his government.

Mithradates permitted Marius to assert Roman primacy as agreed. The treaty with the Pontic king was concluded in the summer of 74, in anticipation of what would become the Third Mithridatic War in the spring of 73.

Sertorius and M. Marius were not the only Romans who preferred an alliance to a war with Mithradates. Two former officers of the notorious Fimbria, Lucius Magius and Lucius Fannius, joined the Pontic king, and both Appuleius Decianus and the senator Attidius were fixtures of some longevity at the Pontic court. None of these men was a political moderate, and all had strong ties to vehement or even extremist populares.

== Military command and death ==
With the alliance between Pontus and Roman Hispania, Sulla's civil war thus continued in the East and merged into the Third Mithridatic War. In late 75 BC, Nicomedes IV of Bithynia died, leaving his kingdom to Rome as a bequest. Sertorius probably made his arrangements before that time, or at least before he was aware that the death had created a new Roman province in Anatolia. Its first Roman governor was Marcus Aurelius Cotta, the consul of 74. The other consul of that year, Lucius Licinius Lucullus, managed to jettison his originally assigned province of Cisalpine Gaul and acquire a more ambitious playing field: the provinces of Cilicia and eventually Asia, along with the chief command of the war against Mithradates.

Lucullus landed in Anatolia during the fall of 74. Mithradates saw his opportunity, and invaded Cappadocia and Bithynia. During this period, Marcus Marius served as advisor and co-commander to the Pontic king. At Chalcedon, a maritime town of Bithynia, they marched and sailed against Cotta, who rushed into battle before Lucullus could join him, prematurely savoring a triumph he didn't want to share. Cotta was instead crushed and forced to withdraw within the town. Marius held joint command with Mithradates' general Eumachos at Chalcedon and in Phrygia.

Lucullus was camped somewhere along the Sangarius river in Bithynia when he received news of Cotta's defeat. His soldiers urged him to leave Cotta to his own folly and march on undefended Pontus with its rich potential for loot. Lucullus preferred to concentrate on Mithridates himself, and headed toward Chalcedon. Marius blocked and confronted him. They faced off at Otroea near Nicaea (present-day Iznik). Although Lucullus commanded 30,000 infantry and 2,500 horse, he was daunted by the size of the opposing army and reluctant to engage. The arrival of an omen, as reported by Plutarch, was thus fortuitous:

But presently, as they were on the point of joining battle, with no apparent change of weather, but all on a sudden, the sky burst asunder, and a huge, flame-like body was seen to fall between the two armies. In shape, it was most like a wine-jar (pithos), and in colour, like molten silver. Both sides were astonished at the sight, and separated. This marvel, as they say, occurred in Phrygia, at a place called Otryae.

No battle occurred. For Marius, delay posed a logistical problem. He had only a few days of supplies for his troops. Lucullus learned of the shortage through prisoner interrogations and decided to wait him out. Marius was forced to move on without the fight he had sought, but the delay allowed Mithradates to leave Chalcedon and set out for Cyzicus.

Mithradates' motive for this siege has sometimes been construed as retribution for the aid given by Cyzicus to the Romans at Chalcedon, but was also a strategic decision. Cyzicus was weakened from losing a significant number of troops at Chalcedon, and its capture would provide him with an abundant and much-needed food supply, as well as access to an excellent harbor and major inland routes. After taking up a position, he divided his forces for a three-prong invasion of the interior. His general Eumachus headed to Phrygia, where he advanced into Pisidia and Isauria. Metrophanes and the Roman renegade Lucius Fannius penetrated as far as northeast Lydia. Lucius Magius remained with Mithradates and appears from this point to have begun misleading him, perhaps because he had heard what may have been still only a rumor of Sertorius's death.

According to some reconstructions of events, it was at this time that Marius assumed the governorship of the Roman province of Asia, where he gained immediate control of Parium and Lampsacus, rejoining the Pontic forces only later in the siege; this is not entirely clear in the ancient sources, which may be recounting operations he conducted earlier upon arrival.

Despite the size of Mithradates' forces and his awe-inspiring siegecraft, he failed to take Cyzicus and its rich stores. Lucullus blocked inland supply routes. The multitudinous Pontic troops were weakened and reduced by famine and plague, and finally Mithradates was compelled to retreat by ship. He placed 30,000 ground troops under the command of Marius and Hermaios. They enabled the king to escape, but lost 11,000 men at the Aesepus (present-day Gönen) and Granicus (Biga) rivers.

Marius then took to the sea. Along with Alexandros the Paphlagonian and Dionysios Eunuchos ("the Eunuch"), he was placed in joint command of 50 ships and 10,000 handpicked men, among them, in the words of Mommsen, "the flower of the Roman emigrants." Their intention seems to have been to sail east into the Aegean, but Lucullus mounted an attack against them. He captured a detachment of 13 ships between the island of Tenedos and the mainland harbor of the Achaeans. The main Pontic force, however, had drawn their ships to shore at a site difficult of approach, the small island of Neae between Lemnos and Scyros; Lucullus then sent infantry by land across Neae to their rear, killing many and forcing the rest back to sea. Lucullus sunk or captured 32 ships of the royal fleet provided by Mithradates and additional transport vessels. Dionysios committed suicide, but Alexandros was captured and held for display in Lucullus's anticipated triumph. Among the dead were a number of men who had been on Sulla's proscription lists. Marius at first escaped, possibly from a sinking ship, since he was later found ashore taking refuge in a cave.

Like Sertorius himself, Marius at some point had lost an eye; when Lucullus gave the order to track down enemy survivors, he specified that no one-eyed men should be killed, so that he could personally oversee the renegade's death: "Lucullus wished Marius to die under the most shameful insults." Orosius reports that he atoned for his rebellious spirit with penalties he earned.

== In fiction ==
Marcus Marius is a character in Michael Curtis Ford's historical novel about Mithradates, The Last King: Rome's Greatest Enemy (2004). He is depicted as maintaining a rugged and arrogant ideal of Republican manliness: "I eat like a soldier, I march like a soldier, and by the gods I fight like a soldier — a Roman soldier." Ford imagines that this Marius was a nephew of the seven-time consul — a grandnephew would be more likely, since the consul's nephew Marcus Marius, known by his cognomen Gratidianus, died in the proscriptions — and that his presence at the Pontic court was meant to draw the support of popularist sympathizers supposed to have been among Lucullus's forces from the legions who had served under Fimbria. Ford's fictional description of Marius's execution recalls the dismemberment of Gratidianus: "he had Marius mounted on a crosstree in that barbaric exercise the Romans call crucifixion and then lopped off his hands, feet, nose, and ears, pruning him like a fig tree in winter. It was a deliberately brutal message, and its effect was not lost, for it caused most of the other exiled Romans fighting for Pontus to scatter in discouragement."

== Sources ==
=== Ancient sources ===
- Livy 91 fr. 22.70 W-M (= Loeb vol. 14, p. 194)
- Plutarch, Life of Lucullus 8.5, 12.5, and Life of Sertorius 23–24
- Appian, Mithridatic Wars 68, 76, 77, under the name Varius (Οὐάριος) instead of Marius
- Memnon, 28–29
- Orosius, 6.2 (Latin)

=== 19th-century histories ===
The following 19th-century historians present narrative reconstructions of strategy and military operations at Chalcedon and Cyzicus:

- Long, George. Decline of the Roman Republic. London, 1869, vol. 3, p. 9ff. online.
- Mommsen, Theodor. The History of Rome. vol. 4, p. 326ff. online.

=== Selected bibliography ===
- Keaveney, Arthur. Lucullus: A Life. Routledge, 1992. See especially Keaveney's narrative of Chalcedon and Cyzicus in limited preview and Appendix 2: "When did the Third Mithridatic War begin?"
- Konrad, Christoph F. Plutarch's Sertorius: A Historical Commentary. University of North Carolina Press, 1994. Limited preview online.
- Konrad, Christoph F. "From the Gracchi to the First Civil War (133–70)." In A Companion to the Roman Republic. Wiley-Blackwell, 2007, 2010.
- McGing, B.C. The Foreign Policy of Mithridates VI Eupator, King of Pontus. Brill, 1986. Limited preview online.

=== Further reading ===
- E. Gabba, Republican Rome: The Armies and the Allies (1976) 120 ff for analysis of Sertorius's policy toward Mithradates. Limited preview online.
