= Battle of Chalcedon (74 BC) =

Battle of the Third Mithridatic War

- Part of Third Mithridatic War
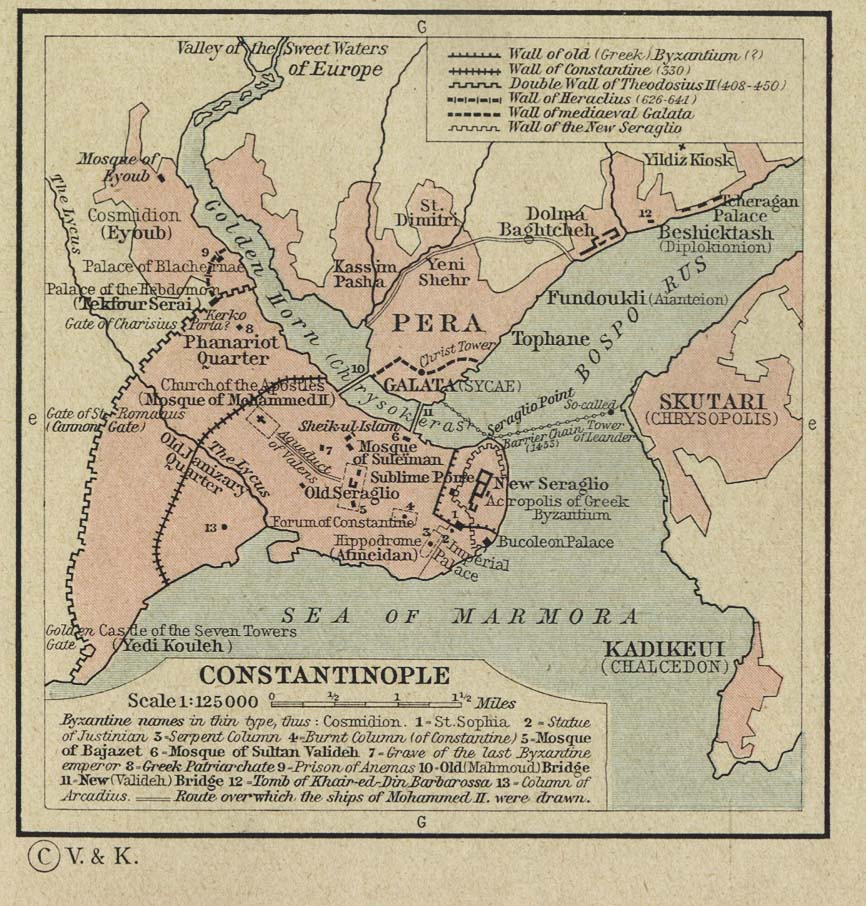
- Map of parts of Eastern Europe during the Mithridatic war.
Date	74 BC
Location	Chalcedon (modern-day Kadıköy, Istanbul, Turkey)
Result	Pontic victory

Belligerents
Kingdom of Pontus	Roman Republic

Commanders and leaders
Mithridates VI	Marcus Aurelius Cotta

Strength
136,000–162,000 men 400 ships 120,000–150,000 infantry 12,000–16,000 cavalry 100–120 scythed chariots	Unknown men 64 ships

Casualties and losses
730 killed	17,800 men 64 ships 7,000–13,300 killed 4,500 captured 4 ships burned 60 ships captured

The Battle of Chalcedon was a land and naval battle between the Roman Republic and King Mithridates VI of Pontus near the city of Chalcedon in 74 BC. It was the first major clash of the Third Mithridatic War. The Roman forces were led by Marcus Aurelius Cotta, one of the consuls for 74 BC, while Mithridates had the overall command of the Pontic forces. The Mithridatic forces were victorious on both land and sea.

== Background ==
After his defeat at the hands of Lucius Cornelius Sulla during the First Mithridatic War (89-85 BC), King Mithridates had rebuilt his power and armies. The Second Mithridatic War (83-81 BC) had ended undecided. Then, in 74 BC, Nicomedes IV, the king of Bithynia died, and the Romans claimed he had bequeathed his kingdom to Rome. Bithynia, located between the Roman province of Asia and the Pontic Empire, functioned as a buffer state between Rome and Mithridates. Its annexation provoked Mithridates, and he invaded the new Roman territory.

== Prelude ==
At the start of the Third Mithridatic War, the Roman consul Marcus Aurelius Cotta took his fleet into the Bosporus; he made his headquarters at Chalcedon, a major port city in Bithynia. Mithridates marched his army into Bithynia, while his fleet sailed to the Bosphorus. Most of Bithynia, outraged by Roman exploitation, welcomed Mithridates, and he was able to advance very rapidly. Cotta decided to make his stand at Chalcedon with the Roman/allied fleet at his back. He also sent urgent messages to Lucius Licinius Lucullus, his fellow consul, who was preparing his army in Asia province, that the Pontic invasion was underway and he needed assistance.

Nudus, Cotta's naval prefect, convinced the consul to let him take the field against Mithridates. He took up a fortified position outside the city and waited for the Pontic army to make the first move.

== Land battle ==
Mithridates sent his forces, led by Bastarnae mercenaries, against the Roman positions outside Chalcedon. Nudus and his men were overwhelmed by the speed and professionalism of the numerically superior Pontic army. The Romans and their allies fell back on the city, but got caught trying to get through the gates. First Pontic archers and slingers fired at the tightly packed Romans trying to get into the city, then the Pontic infantry charged. The city defenders had no choice but to drop the portcullis to prevent Mithridates' men from getting inside. This left a large portion of the Roman forces outside the walls. Nudus and some of his officers were pulled over the ramparts using ropes, but most men were slaughtered; some 3,000 Roman-allied soldiers were killed before Chalcedon's walls.

== Harbour raid ==
Mithridates followed up his success with a combined land and sea assault on the harbour. An advance party of Bastarnae managed to break the bronze chain which blocked entrance to the port, and the Pontic fleet sailed in. Four ships were sunk and sixty ships, the rest of Cotta's fleet, were captured and towed away. The city itself remained in Roman hands, but there was little that Cotta could do.

== Losses ==
The Romans lost 4,000–5,300 on land, 3,000–8,000 perished during the battle for the harbour and 4,500 were captured. Mithridates lost only 30 Bastarnae and 700 others dead.

== Aftermath ==
With Cotta bereft of an army and fleet, his local support melted away, Nicaea, Lampsacus, Nicomedia and Apameia, all major cities in the region, fell to Mithridates or opened their gates to him. Only nearby Cyzicus remained in the Roman camp, probably because many of its citizens (serving in Cotta's army as auxiliaries) had died fighting against Mithridates at Chalcedon. The Pontic army marched on Cyzicus and began a siege, hoping to take the city before Lucullus could arrive. During the siege of Cyzicus, Lucullus was able to establish a counter-siege; Mithridates' army was destroyed by famine and plague, and the king fled back to Pontus. But the war was far from over and would rage on for another decade.

== Bibliography ==
- Jaques, Tony (2006). Dictionary of Battles and Sieges. Greenwood. p. 220. ISBN 978-0-313-33536-5.
