= Third Mithridatic War =

War between Rome and Mithridates, 73–63 BC

- Part of the Mithridatic Wars
- Asia Minor and surrounding region, 89 BC.
Date	73–63 BC
Location	Asia Minor
Result	Roman victory
Territorial changes	Pontus and Syria become Roman provinces Judea becomes a client state of Rome; Armenia becomes an ally of Rome

Belligerents
Roman Republic; Bithynia; Galatia; Cyzicus	Kingdom of Pontus; Kingdom of Armenia; Kingdom of Iberia; Caucasian Albania; Sarmatians

Commanders and leaders
Lucullus; Marcus Aurelius Cotta; Pompey	Mithridates VI of Pontus; Tigranes II of Armenia; Oroeses of Albania; Artoces of Iberia; Marcus Marius/Varius

The Third Mithridatic War (73–63 BC), the last and longest of the three Mithridatic Wars, was fought between Mithridates VI of Pontus and the Roman Republic. Both sides were joined by a great number of allies, dragging the entire Eastern Mediterranean and large parts of Asia (Asia Minor, Greater Armenia, northern Mesopotamia and the Levant) into the war. The conflict ended in defeat for Mithridates; it ended the Pontic Kingdom and the Seleucid Empire (by then a rump state), and also resulted in the Kingdom of Armenia becoming an allied client state of Rome.

== Background ==
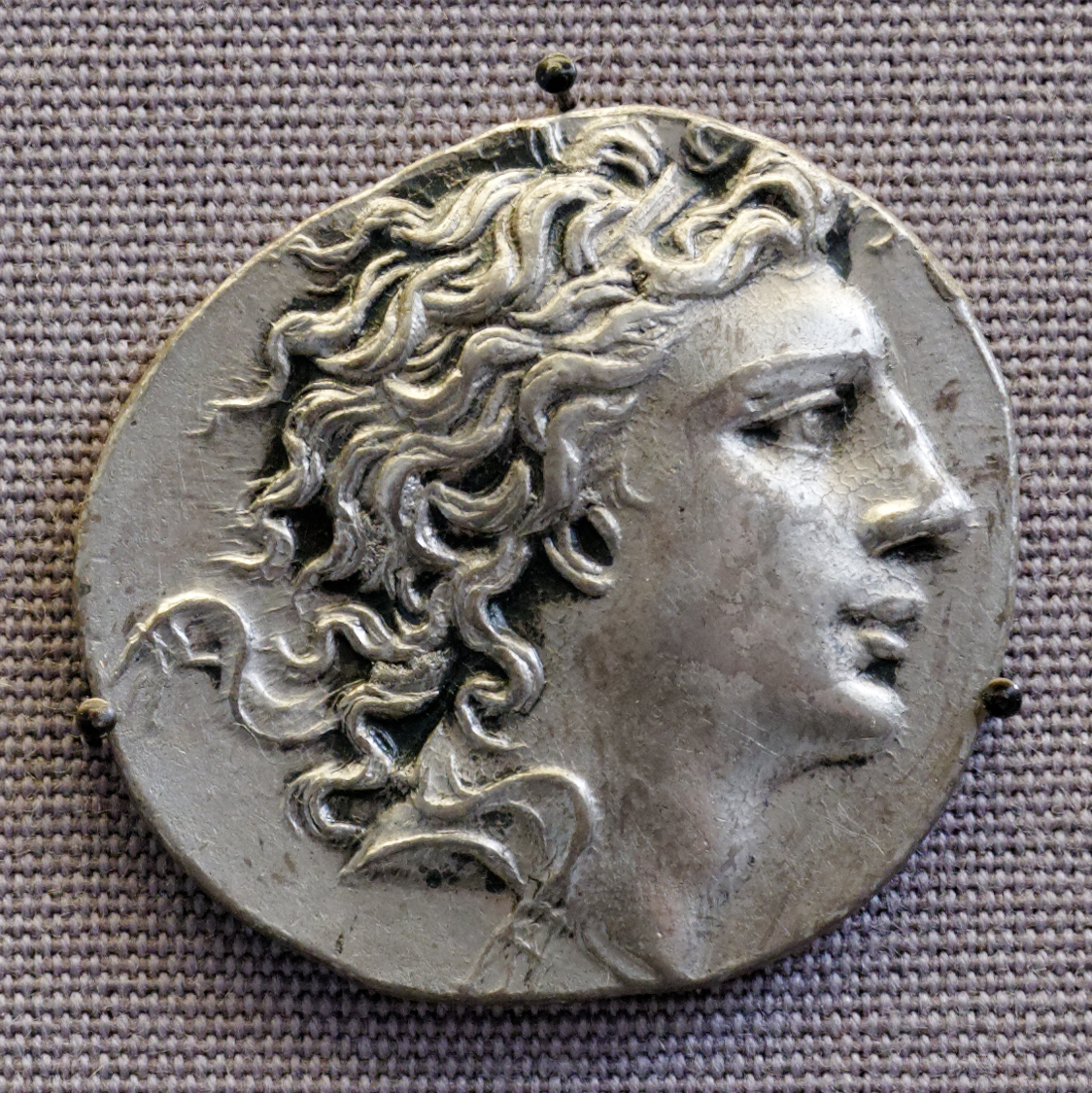
Coin of King Mithridates VI of Pontus

In 120 BC, Mithridates V, the king of Pontus was poisoned by unknown figures. The conspirators were probably working for his wife Laodice. In his will Mithridates V left the kingdom to the joint rule of Laodice, Mithridates VI and Mithridates Chrestus. Both of her sons were underage and Laodice retained all power as regent. Laodice in her regency favored her second son (Chrestus was probably more pliable). During her regency 120–116 BC (perhaps even 113 BC), Mithridates VI escaped the court of his mother and went into hiding. He returned between 116 and 113 BC and was able to remove his mother and his brother from the Pontic throne, thus becoming the sole ruler of Pontus.

Mithridates entertained ambitions of making his state the dominant power in the east of Asia Minor and the Black Sea region. He first subjugated Colchis, a region east of the Black Sea, and prior to 164 BC, an independent kingdom. He then clashed for supremacy on the Pontic steppe with the Scythian King Palacus. The most important cities and people of the Crimea, the Tauric Chersonesus and the Bosporan Kingdom readily surrendered their independence in return for Mithridates' protection against the Scythians, their ancient enemies. The Scythians and their allies the Rhoxolanoi suffered heavy losses at the hands of the Pontic general Diophantus and accepted Mithridates as their overlord.

The young king then turned his attention to Asia Minor, where Roman power was on the rise. He contrived to partition Paphlagonia and Galatia with King Nicomedes III of Bithynia. Yet it soon became clear to Mithridates that Nicomedes was steering his country into an anti-Pontic alliance with the expanding Roman Republic. When Mithridates fell out with Nicomedes over control of Cappadocia, and defeated him in a series of battles, the latter was constrained to openly enlist the assistance of Rome. The Romans twice interfered in the conflict on behalf of Nicomedes (95–92 BC), leaving Mithridates, should he wish to continue the expansion of his kingdom, with little choice other than to engage in a future Roman-Pontic war. By this time Mithridates had resolved to expel the Romans from Asia.

The next ruler of Bithynia, Nicomedes IV of Bithynia, was a figurehead manipulated by the Romans. Mithridates plotted to overthrow him, but his attempts failed and Nicomedes IV, instigated by his Roman advisors, declared war on Pontus. Rome itself was involved in the Social War, a civil war with its Italian allies. Thus, in all of Roman Asia Province there were few Roman troops available. The Romans therefore mustered a great number of Asian levies and combined with Nicomedes' army they invaded Mithridates' kingdom in 89 BC. Mithridates won a decisive victory, scattering the Roman-led forces. His victorious forces were welcomed throughout Asia Minor. The following year, 88 BC, Mithridates orchestrated a massacre of Roman and Italian settlers remaining in several Anatolian cities, essentially wiping out the Roman presence in the region. 80,000 people are said to have perished in this massacre. The episode is known as the Asiatic Vespers.

The Romans responded by organising a large invasion force (this time sending their own legions) to defeat him and remove him from power. The First Mithridatic War, fought between 88 BC and 84 BC, saw Lucius Cornelius Sulla force Mithridates out of Greece proper. After being victorious in several battles Sulla, being declared an outlaw by his political opponents in Rome, hurriedly concluded peace talks with Mithridates. As Sulla returned to Italy Lucius Licinius Murena was left in charge of Roman forces in Anatolia. The lenient peace treaty, which was never ratified by the Senate, allowed Mithridates VI to restore his forces. Murena attacked Mithridates in 83 BC, provoking the Second Mithridatic War from 83 BC to 81 BC. Mithridates defeated Murena's two green legions at the Battle of Halys in 82 BC before peace was again declared by treaty.

== Prelude ==
The period between the Second and Third wars of Rome and the Pontic Kingdom (81–75 BC) is discussed under the Kingdom of Pontus. There it can be seen how the long piracy wars were a development out of the First Mithridatic War and especially of the alliance between Mithridates VI and Sertorius, which in joining those two threats into a unity much larger than its parts had the serious potential of overturning Roman power. The immediate cause of the Third War was the bequest to Rome by King Nicomedes IV of Bithynia of his kingdom upon his death (74 BC). Mithridates, who had been rebuilding his forces, launched an invasion of Bithynia.

== Forces and initial deployments, 74–73 BC ==
Having launched an attack at the same time as a revolt by Sertorius swept through the Spanish provinces, Mithridates was initially virtually unopposed. The Senate responded by sending the consuls Lucius Licinius Lucullus and Marcus Aurelius Cotta to deal with the Pontic threat. The only other possible general for such an important command, Pompey, was in Hispania to help Metellus Pius crush the revolt led by Sertorius. Lucullus was sent to govern Cilicia and Cotta to Bithynia. According to Appian and Plutarch Lucullus had 30,000 infantry and 1,600–2,500 cavalry while Mithridates was rumoured to have as many as 300,000 men in his force.

The original plan was that Cotta should tie down Mithridates' fleet, while Lucullus attacked by land. Cotta was therefore ordered to station his fleet at Chalcedon, while Lucullus marched through Phrygia with the intention of invading Pontus. Lucullus had not advanced far when news came through that Mithridates had made a rapid march westward, attacked and defeated Cotta at the Battle of Chalcedon, and forced him to flee behind the walls of Chalcedon. Sixty-four Roman ships had been captured or burnt, and Cotta had lost three thousand men. There Cotta was forced to remain until Lucullus could come to his rescue.

== Mithridates's defeat in western Asia, 73–72 BC ==
Having made his way to Nicomedia, Cotta watched in frustration as Mithridates marched on taking Nicaea, Lampsacus, Nicomedia and Apameia, all major cities in the region. Only nearby Cyzicus held to the Roman cause, probably because many of its citizens (serving in Cotta's army as auxiliaries) had died fighting against Mithridates at Chalcedon. The Pontic army marched on Cyzicus and began a siege.

Lucullus was camped somewhere along the Sangarius river in Bithynia when he received news of Cotta's defeat. His soldiers urged him to leave Cotta to his own folly and march on undefended Pontus with its rich potential for loot. Lucullus ignored them and headed toward Chalcedon. Marcus Marius, a Roman rebel cooperating with Mithridates, blocked and confronted him. They faced off at Otroea near Nicaea (present-day Iznik). Although Lucullus commanded 30,000 infantry and 2,500 cavalry, he was daunted by the size of the opposing army and reluctant to engage. The arrival of an omen, as reported by Plutarch, was thus fortuitous:

But presently, as they were on the point of joining battle, with no apparent change of weather, but all on a sudden, the sky burst asunder, and a huge, flame-like body was seen to fall between the two armies. In shape, it was most like a wine-jar (pithos), and in colour, like molten silver. Both sides were astonished at the sight, and separated. This marvel, as they say, occurred in Phrygia, at a place called Otryae.

No battle occurred. For Marius, delay posed a logistical problem. He had only a few days of supplies for his troops. Lucullus learned of the shortage through prisoner interrogations and decided to wait him out. Marius was forced to move on without the fight he had sought.

=== Siege of Cyzicus ===
While Mithridates was besieging Cyzicus, Lucullus and his army arrived; the Romans, with the help of some turncoats, were able to establish a counter-siege, trapping Mithridates' army on the Cyzicus peninsula. During the siege Mithridates sent his cavalry away, with the sick and the wounded, but they were ambushed and slaughtered at the river Rhyndacus. In the middle of a snowstorm, Lucullus met these forces with ten cohorts and attacked them in mid-crossing on both sides of the river. Plutarch and Appian record 15,000 men and 6,000 horses as being captured during the battle. The disaster at the Rhyndacus combined with the famine and a plague which had struck his main army forced Mithridates to completely abandon his position, sailing north while his army marched overland. Lucullus pursued the army and defeated them at the confluence of the Aesepus and Granicus Rivers, slaughtering many (20,000 were killed while crossing the river Granicus). Eventually, of the 300,000 who had set out for Bithynia, only 20,000 effective troops remained. The siege of Cyzicus and the subsequent retreat could be considered an unmitigated disaster.

=== Naval campaign ===
Marcus Marius, having survived the Cyzicus campaign, had taken to the sea. Along with Mithridates's admirals Alexandros the Paphlagonian and Dionysios Eunuchos ("the Eunuch"), he was placed in joint command of 50 ships and 10,000 handpicked men, among them, in the words of Mommsen, "the flower of the Roman emigrants." Their intention seems to have been to sail east into the Aegean, but Lucullus mounted an attack against them. He captured a detachment of 13 ships between the island of Tenedos and the mainland harbor of the Achaeans. The main Pontic force, however, had drawn their ships to shore at a site difficult of approach, the small island of Neae between Lemnos and Scyros; Lucullus then sent infantry by land across Neae to their rear, killing many and forcing the rest back to sea. Lucullus sunk or captured 32 ships of the royal fleet provided by Mithradates and additional transport vessels. Dionysios committed suicide, but Alexandros was captured and held for display in Lucullus's anticipated triumph. Among the dead were a number of men who had been on Sulla's proscription lists. Marius at first escaped, possibly from a sinking ship, since he was later found ashore taking refuge in a cave.

Like Sertorius himself, Marius at some point had lost an eye; when Lucullus gave the order to track down enemy survivors, he specified that no one-eyed men should be killed, so that he could personally oversee the renegade's death: "Lucullus wished Marius to die under the most shameful insults." Orosius reports that he atoned for his rebellious spirit with penalties he earned.

While Lucullus and Cotta prepared to invade Pontus, Mithridates gained control of the strategically important city of Heraclea Pontica and garrisoned it with 4,000 men. Hearing of the situation at Heraclea, Lucullus and Cotta decided that Cotta would march on Heraclea while Lucullus would move through the Galatian highlands and invade Pontus from there.

== Lucullus's invasion and conquest of Pontus, 71–69 BC ==
In 72 BC, while Cotta moved against Heraclea and Triarius managed naval affairs, Lucullus marched his army through Galatia and into Pontus. The Galatians were only too happy to supply the Romans because they detested Mithridates. They were keen to see the Roman legions pass through Galatia without plundering it. Once Lucullus was in the Pontic heartland and he let his troops plunder the rich and fertile area. Mithridates could do nothing to stop the despoiling of his lands for he had to rebuild his army. He eventually assembled 40,000 men (4,000 cavalry) near Cabira and waited for Lucullus.

=== Themiscyra ===
Upon entering Pontus, Lucullus lay siege to Themiscyra, the legendary home of the Amazons, on the River Thermodon. Lucullus's forces erected siege towers and dug great tunnel passages underneath the walls. These tunnels were so large that significant battles were later fought within them. The Themiscyrans are said to have introduced bears, other large animals, and even swarms of bees into the subterranean passages to fight off Lucullus's men.

=== Cabira ===
After careful manoeuvering, Lucullus occupied an old fortress on the heights overlooking Cabira. This was a secure and very defensible position, but its location meant the Romans were cut off from their recent conquests in Pontus and their supply lines now had to come north from Cappadocia, a Roman ally, to the south of Pontus. Since Mithridates dominated the countryside, Lucullus had to send out heavily armed convoys to get supplies. One of those supply convoys, escorted by no less than ten cohorts of infantry (3,000–5,000 men), under the command of the legate Sornatius was attacked by the Pontic cavalry. The Roman infantry stood their ground and held off the attack inflicting terrible losses on the Pontic horsemen. When a second supply convoy, also heavily armed, under the command of the legate Marcus Fabius Hadrianus made for Lucullus's camp Mithridates decided to use a combined arms (infantry and cavalry) attack. A force of 4,000 cavalry and infantry fell upon the convoy, unfortunately for Mithridates, the Romans realized the narrow valley at the scene limited the effectiveness of their opponents' cavalry and they counter-attacked wiping out half the attacking force. With the Romans re-supplied and his attack-force decimated (c. 2000 casualties) Mithridates decided to retreat. During the preparations for the retreat a panic broke out among his troops, Lucullus became aware of what was happening, mustered his army, and attacked Mithridates's camp; at this point the Pontic army broke and disintegrated.

After the Battle of Cabira, Mithridates fled Pontus, he went to Armenia seeking his son-in-law king Tigranes' support. Joined by Lucullus at Nicomedia in 73 BC, Cotta was assigned the task of securing Lucullus' rear by taking Heraclea Pontica, which Mithridates had reinforced with 4,000 troops. After reducing the Pontic coast, Cotta began besieging Heraclea itself, which took him two years to complete, sacking the city in 71 BC. During this time he was forced to dismiss one of his quaestors, Publius Oppius, charging him with bribery and conspiracy. Lucullus himself consolidated Roman control over Pontus. First returning to the siege of Amisus.

=== Amisus ===
With Mithridates out of his reach Lucullus set about consolidating his hold on Pontus. Amisus, an important Greek city in Pontus, was still holding out against Murena whom Lucullus had put in charge of the siege. Mithridates had sent the Greek Callimachus, a master of siege warfare, to Amisus to help with its defence. Callimachus created a number of mechanical defensive devices which gave the Romans a lot of hardships. Lucullus took over from Murena and proved his tactical genius once again by launching an attack at precisely the right time (when Callimachus let his defenders take a rest) and took Amisus, but not without regret; his soldiers ransacked the city and turned it into a ruin. Lucullus, a great admirer of Greek culture, lamented that Sulla had been blessed because he was able to save Athens, while the gods had ordained the fate of Lucius Mummius Achaicus, the destroyer of Corinth, for him.

=== Sinope ===
After Amisus Lucullus besieged Sinope, Pontus' main port city, which was also holding out against the Romans. There was significant resistance; the garrison was doing well in defending the coastal city on water as well as land. Lucullus kept up the pressure and finally the defenders gave up, they burned their heavier ships while escaping on lighter vessels. Lucullus granted the city its freedom because the real resistance had not come from the Sinopians themselves but from Cilician troops Mithridates had garrisoned there.

While Lucullus stayed in the East, Cotta returned to Rome in 70 BC, where he at first was widely acclaimed for his victory at Heraclea. However, around 67 BC he was accused of appropriation of war booty by Gaius Papirius Carbo. He was convicted of the offence and expelled from the Senate.

== First Roman-Armenian War, 69–67 BC ==
After the Battle of Cabira Mithridates fled to his son-in-law Tigranes II the king of the Armenian Empire. Lucullus, busy mopping up resistance in Pontus and Armenia Minor (also part of Mithridates's former dominions), sent his brother-in-law Appius Claudius Pulcher as an emissary to the Armenian king demanding he hand over Mithridates. Since handing over his father-in-law would make him look like nothing more than a puppet of Rome, Tigranes had no other choice than to refuse and prepare for war.

In the spring of 69 BC Lucullus marched his army from Cappadocia across the Euphrates into Greater Armenia (the Armenian Empire's heartland) and the Roman-Armenian War began.

Tigranes sent one of his nobles, Mithrobarzanes, with 2,000–3,000 cavalry to expel the invader. Mithrobarzanes charged the Romans while they were setting up their camp, but was met by a 3,500-strong sentry force and his horsemen were routed. He perished in the attempt.

=== Battle of Tigranocerta ===
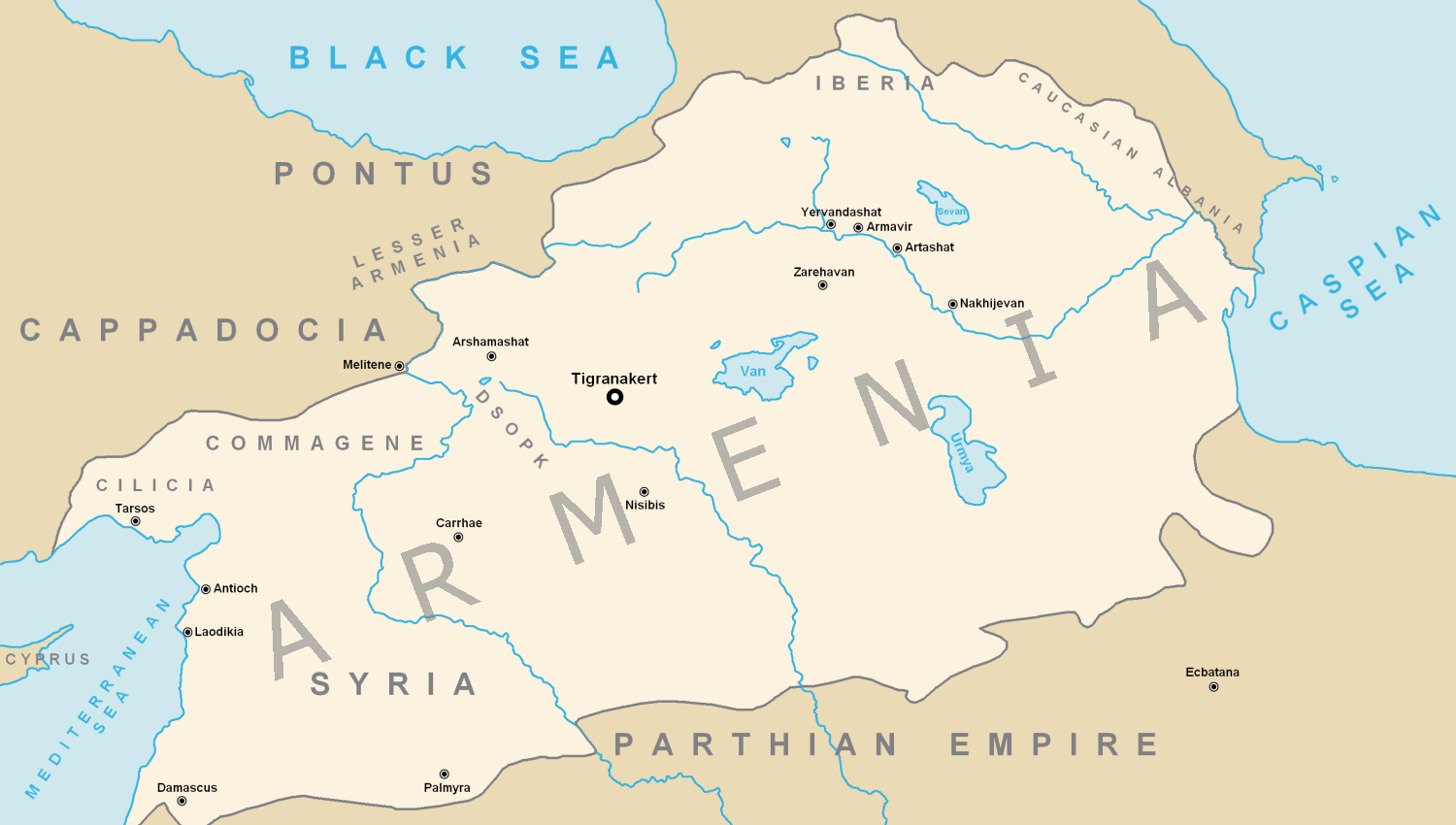
Tigranes the Great's empire c. 80 BC.

Lucullus began a siege of the new Armenian imperial capital of Tigranocerta in the Arzenene district. Tigranes, with his main host, returned from mopping up a Seleucid rebellion in Syria, and sought battle with the Romans. Lucullus' army annihilated the Armenian host, despite odds of about more than two to one against him. This was the famous battle of Tigranocerta. It was fought on the same (pre-Julian) calendar date as the Roman disaster at Arausio 36 years earlier, the day before the Nones of October according to the reckoning of the time (or October 6), which is Julian October 16, 69 BC. Tigranes then retired to the northern regions of his kingdom to gather another army and defend his hereditary capital of Artaxata. Meanwhile, Lucullus moved off south-eastwards to the kingdom of the Kurds (Korduene) on the frontiers of the Armenian and Parthian empires. During the winter of 69–68 BC both sides opened negotiations with the Parthian king, Arsaces XVI, who was presently defending himself against a major onslaught from his rival Phraates III coming from Bactria and the far east.

=== Battle of Artaxata ===
In the summer of 68 BC Lucullus marched against Tigranes and crossed the Anti-Taurus range heading for the old Armenian capital Artaxata. Once again, Tigranes was provoked to attack, and in a major battle at the Aratsani River, Lucullus defeated the Armenian army. Soon he left this campaign, and when winter came on early in the Armenian tablelands, his troops mutinied, refusing to go further, and he was forced to withdraw southwards back into Arzenene. From there he proceeded back down through Korduene into old Assyria (Northern Mesopotamia) and in the late autumn and early winter besieged Nisibis, the main Armenian fortress city and treasury in Northern Mesopotamia.

=== Nisibis ===
The Armenian garrison at Nisibis was under the command of Tigranes's brother Gouras and the Greek defence expert Callimachus. At first Lucullus besieged the city to no avail; it was strongly fortified, with two walls of brick and a moat. But in the winter of 68/67 BC, during a terrible storm – when the defenders relaxed their guard – Lucullus launched a surprise attack and captured the city and its treasury. It made no difference, Mithridates and Tigranes stuck to their strategy and refused to march against Lucullus; Tigranes was in the process of taking back southern Armenia and Mithridates invaded Pontus.

== Mithridates return to Pontus ==
In the spring of 67 BC, while Lucullus was laying siege to Nisibis, Mithridates suddenly returned to Pontus. The Romans had not expected Mithridates to strike at them in Pontus and he caught several small Roman detachments unaware. The legate Gaius Valerius Triarius who was nearby bringing two legions to reinforce Lucullus took command of all Roman forces in Pontus. After several skirmishes and small battles, a major battle took place on a plain near Zela (the Battle of Zela); the Romans were defeated, leaving 7,000 dead, including 24 tribunes and 150 centurions. As a result, Mithridates was back in control of Pontus.

During the winter of 68–67 BC, at Nisibis, Lucullus's authority over his army was seriously undermined by the efforts of his young brother-in-law Publius Clodius Pulcher, apparently acting in the interests and pay of Pompey the Great, who was eager to succeed Lucullus in the eastern command. Lucullus was able to persuade his army to march back to Asia Minor to protect Roman interests there, but they refused to march against Mithridates. They were tired of constant campaigning for little profit. They threw their purses at Lucullus's feet and accused him that he was the only one making a personal profit of this war and told him to continue it on his own. Since his army refused to campaign against Mithridates, Lucullus withdrew to Galatia leaving Mithridates to consolidate his power and rebuild his army in Pontus. In 66 BC, the Senate sent Pompey (who had been lobbying for the command against Mithridates) to succeed Lucullus. The lull allowed Mithridates and Tigranes to retake part of their respective kingdoms.

== Pompey in command ==
Early in 66 the tribune Gaius Manilius proposed that Pompey should assume supreme command of the war against Mithridates and Tigranes. He should take control from the provincial governors in Asia Minor, have the power to appoint legates himself and the authority to make war and peace and to conclude treaties on his own discretion. The law, the Lex Manilia, was approved by the Senate and the People and Pompey officially took command of the war in the east.

Pompey secured a treaty with Phraates III to keep Parthia neutral, but Phraates was ultimately persuaded to invade Armenia by Tigranes the Younger (the rebellious son of Tigranes the Great). Pompey marched the main Roman army toward Pontus, while Parthian forces attacked the Armenian heartland. When Mithridates offered a truce, Lucullus argued the war was over, but Pompey demanded concessions that could not be accepted. Outnumbered, Mithridates retreated into the centre of his kingdom trying to stretch and cut off the Roman supply lines but this strategy did not work (Pompey excelled at logistics). Eventually Pompey cornered and defeated Mithridates at the river Lycus near the end of 66 BC. As Tigranes II of Armenia, his son-in-law, refused to receive him into his dominions (Greater Armenia), Mithridates fled to Colchis, and hence made his way to his own dominions in the Cimmerian Bosporus. Pompey marched against Tigranes, whose kingdom and authority were now severely weakened. Tigranes then sued for peace and met with Pompey to plead a cessation of hostilities. The Armenian Kingdom became an allied client state of Rome. From Armenia, Pompey marched north against the Caucasian tribes and kingdoms who still supported Mithridates.

In 65 BC, Pompey had set out in pursuit of Mithridates, meeting opposition from the Albanians who tried to overrun his camps and the Iberians whom he defeated at the battle of the Pelorus. After defeating the Albanians and Iberians he advanced into Colchis as far as Phasis, where he met up with Servilius, the admiral of his Euxine fleet. From Phasis, Pompey marched east again for he had heard the Iberians were gathering their army again, he caught them at the river Abas where he decisively defeated them (see: battle of Abas).

=== Complete Roman victory ===
After his defeat by Pompey in 65 BC, Mithridates VI fled with a small army from Colchis to Crimea and attempted to raise yet another army to take on the Romans but failed to do so. In 63 BC, he withdrew to the citadel in Panticapaeum. His eldest son, Machares, now king of Cimmerian Bosporus, whose kingdom had been reorganized by the Romans, was unwilling to aid his father. Mithridates had Machares murdered and took the throne of the Bosporan Kingdom, intent on retaking Pontus from the Romans. His younger son, Pharnaces II, backed by a disgruntled and war-weary populace, led a rebellion against his father. This betrayal, after the decisive defeat in battle, hurt Mithridates more than any other and seeing his loss of authority he attempted suicide by poison. The attempt failed as he had gained immunity to various poisons from taking tiny doses of all available poisons throughout his life to guard against assassination. According to Appian's Roman History, he then ordered his Gallic bodyguard and friend, Bituitus, to kill him by the sword: Mithridates' body was buried in either Sinope or Amaseia, on the orders of Pompey.
