= Siege of Cyzicus =

Battle of the Third Mithridatic War

Battle of Cyzicus
- Part of Third Mithridatic War
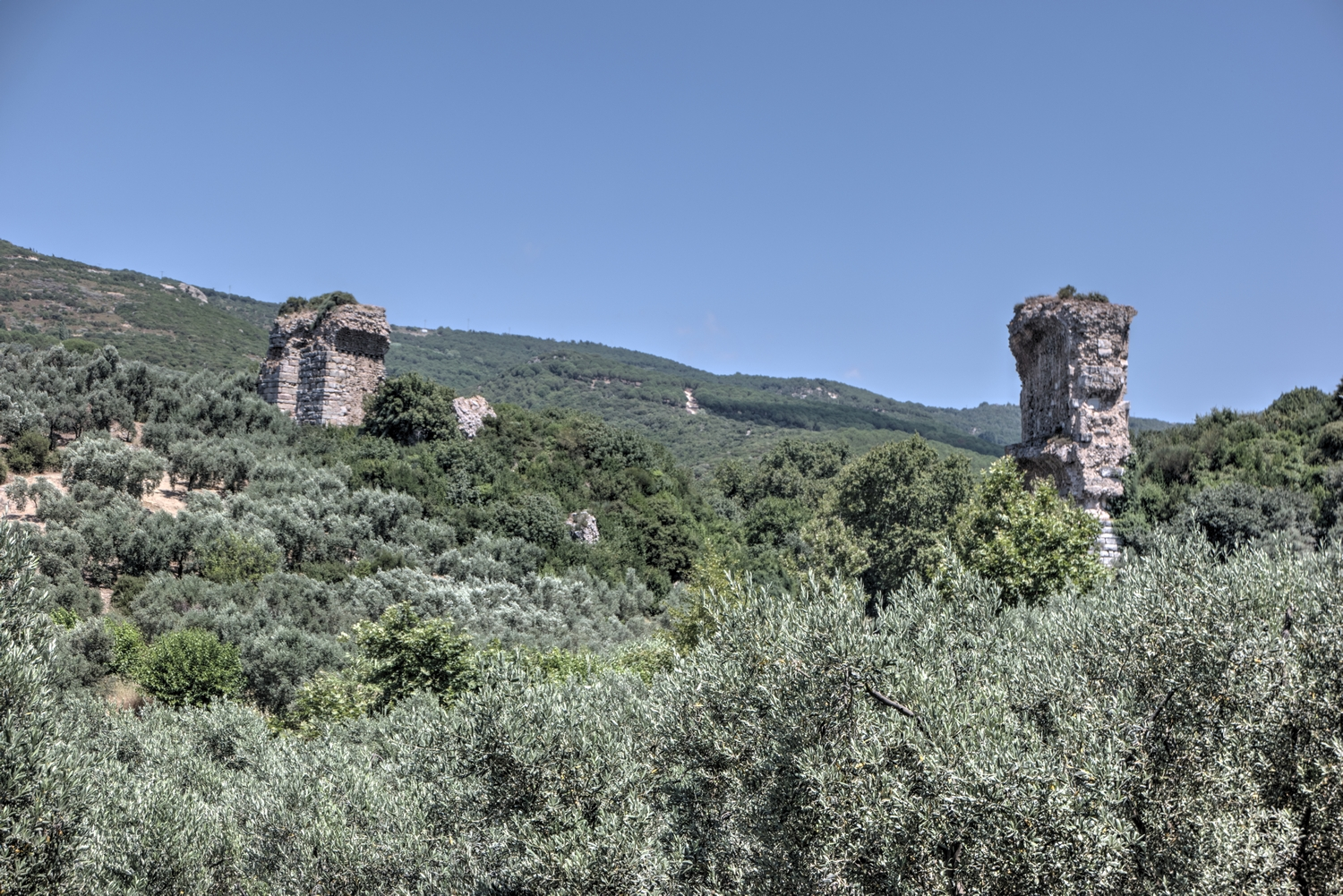
- Ruins of Cyzicus
| Date | 73 BC |
| Location | Cyzicus (modern-day Erdek, Balıkesir, Turkey) |
| Result | Roman victory |

Belligerents
| Roman Republic; Cyzicus | Kingdom of Pontus |

Commanders and leaders
| Lucius Licinius Lucullus | Mithridates VI of Pontus |

Strength
| Appian: 30,000 infantry and 1,600 cavalry Plutarch: 30,000 infantry and 2,500 cavalry | 300,000 probably including camp followers |

Casualties and losses
| Very low | Very high |

The siege of Cyzicus took place in 73 BC between the armies of Mithridates VI of Pontus and the Roman-allied citizens of Cyzicus in Mysia and Roman Republican forces under Lucius Licinius Lucullus. It was in fact a siege and a counter-siege. It ended in a decisive Roman victory.

== Background ==
After his defeat at the hands of Lucius Cornelius Sulla during the First Mithridatic War (89-85 BC) Mithridates rebuilt his power and armies. Then, in 74 BC, Nicomedes IV the king of Bithynia died and the Romans claimed he had left his kingdom to Rome in his will. Bithynia had been a buffer state between Rome and Pontus. Its removal caused Mithridates to march his armies westwards and invade Roman territory.

== Prelude ==
Marcus Aurelius Cotta, the Roman governor of Bithynia, was building up his forces when Mithridates invaded. Cotta, not ready to face Mithridates, retreated to Chalcedon, where he had the fleet to his back, and sent urgent messages to former consular colleague Lucullus, who had secured the command against Mithridates as his proconsular mission. Lucullus was in Asia, training and preparing his army to invade Pontus from the south, but he put his plans on halt and marched towards Bithynia to deal with the invasion. Unfortunately for the Romans, Cotta was drawn into a battle before the walls of Chalcedon and lost 3,000 men. Mithridates followed up this success with a combined land and sea assault in which he captured most of Cotta's fleet. Mithridates left Cotta under siege and marched his main army westward taking city after city until he reached the Roman-allied city of Cyzicus.

== Siege ==
Cyzicus was located on a peninsula with a very narrow connection to the mainland (like a spearpoint aimed inland). Mithridates had to ship part of his army onto the peninsula to effectively besiege the city. He took the harbour and then started to put up siegeworks. Pontic engineers under the direction of Niconides of Thessaly, Mithridates' chief engineer, began assembling a 150-foot siege tower, battering rams, catapults, and other siege weaponry, including giant crossbows.

== Counter-siege ==
Unfortunately for Mithridates, Cyzicus held out long enough for Lucullus and his army to arrive. Lucullus, unwilling to fight a pitched battle against the numerically superior Mithridatic army, set up camp on a hill overlooking the city. The Romans were astonished by the size of the Mithridatic army, but from experience Lucullus knew the difficulties of keeping an army fed. After interrogating a number of prisoners, Lucullus found out that the Mithridatic army had only about four days of supplies left. He explained to his officers that the best way to defeat a large army is to stamp on its stomach. He then ordered his men to conduct a counter-siege, they did so and even succeeded in cutting off Mithridates' supply lines while keeping their own open.

Mithridates attempted to convince the Cyzicans that the Roman army was his own reserve, but Lucullus was able to get one of his men into the city and he convinced them otherwise. The messenger had to sneak through the Mithridatic siege lines and then swim seven miles to the city (he did so with the help of a flotation device).

With the onset of winter, Mithridates's forces faced starvation and plague. The plague was brought on by "corpses that were thrown out unburied". The army of Lucullus was a constant threat, always nearby and yet never willing to engage in force. With disease and starvation running rampant the king decided it was time to withdraw. Probably making use of the vile winter weather, Mithridates was able to break through Lucullus' stranglehold and marched his army towards Lampsacus.

== Aftermath ==
The Mithridatic army made its way along the coast to the port of Lampsacus. Along the way, they were attacked and destroyed at the Granicus river (the same river where Alexander the Great won his first victory over the Persians). Of the 300,000 who had set out for Bithynia only 20,000 effective troops remained. The siege of Cyzicus could be considered an unmitigated disaster.

== Notes and references ==
=== Bibliography ===
- Jaques, Tony (2006). Dictionary of Battles and Sieges. Greenwood. p. 279. ISBN 978-0-313-33536-5.
- Rickard, J. Military History Encyclopedia on the Web. "Siege of Cyzicus, 73 B.C." Accessed 3 Sept 2011.
- Philip Matyszak, Mithridates the Great, Rome's Indomitable Enemy, pp 106–113
- Lee Fratantuono, Lucullus the Life and Campaigns of a Roman Conqueror, pp 55–62.
