= Lucullus =

Roman politician and general (118–57/56 BC)

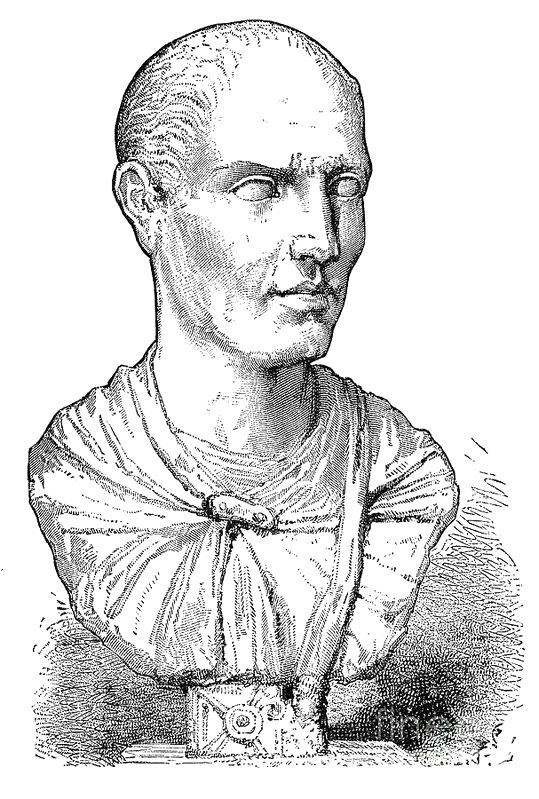
- Engraving of a marble bust traditionally said to be Lucullus (Hermitage Museum)
- Born: 118 BC
- Died: 57/56 BC (aged 61 or 62)
- Office: Consul of Rome (74 BC)
- Spouse(s): Claudia; Servilia
- Parents: Lucius Licinius Lucullus (father); Caecilia Metella (mother)
- Military career
- Years: 91–66 BC
- Conflicts: Social War; First Mithridatic War; Third Mithridatic War

Lucius Licinius Lucullus (/ljuːˈkʌləs/; 118–57/56 BC) was a Roman general and statesman, closely connected with Lucius Cornelius Sulla. In culmination of over 20 years of almost continuous military and government service, he conquered the eastern kingdoms in the course of the Third Mithridatic War, exhibiting extraordinary generalship in diverse situations, most famously during the Siege of Cyzicus in 73–72 BC, and at the Battle of Tigranocerta in Armenian Arzanene in 69 BC. His command style received unusually favourable attention from ancient military experts, and his campaigns appear to have been studied as examples of skillful generalship.

Lucullus returned to Rome from the East with so much captured booty that the vast sums of treasure, jewels, priceless works of art, and slaves could not be fully accounted for. On his return Lucullus poured enormous sums into private building projects, husbandry and even aquaculture projects, which shocked and amazed his contemporaries by their magnitude. He also patronised the arts and sciences lavishly, transforming his hereditary estate in the highlands of Tusculum into a hotel-and-library complex for scholars and philosophers. He built the famous horti Lucullani (Palace and gardens of Lucullus) on the Pincian Hill in Rome, and became a cultural innovator in the deployment of imperial wealth. His achievements led Pliny the Elder to refer to him as "Xerxes in a Toga". He died during the winter of 57–56 BC and was buried at the family estate near Tusculum.

The conquest agnomen of Ponticus is sometimes incorrectly appended to his name in modern texts. In ancient sources it is attributed only to his consular colleague Marcus Aurelius Cotta after the latter’s capture and brutal destruction of Heraclea Pontica during the Third Mithridatic War.

== Contemporary sources ==
Lucullus was included in the biographical collections of Roman leading generals and politicians, originating in the biographical compendium of famous Romans published by his contemporary Marcus Terentius Varro. Two biographies of Lucullus survive today, Plutarch's Lucullus in the famous series of Parallel Lives, in which Lucullus is paired with the Athenian aristocratic politician and Strategos Cimon, and # 74 in the slender Latin Liber de viris illustribus, of late and unknown authorship, the main sources for which appear to go back to Varro and his most significant successor in the genre, Gaius Julius Hyginus.

== Family and early career ==
Lucullus was a member of the prominent gens Licinia, and of the family, or stirps, of the Luculli, which may have been descended from the ancient nobility of Tusculum. He was grandson of Lucius Licinius Lucullus, consul in 151 BC, and son of Lucius Licinius Lucullus, praetor in 104 BC, who was convicted for embezzlement during his Sicilian command (104/3) and exiled in c. 102 BC.

The family of his mother Caecilia Metella (born c. 137 BC), was a powerful nobile family at the height of its success and influence in the last quarter of the 2nd century BC when Lucullus was born. She was the youngest child of Lucius Caecilius Metellus Calvus (consul 142 and censor 115–14), and half-sister of two of the most important influential senators, Quintus Caecilius Metellus Numidicus (consul 109 and censor 102) and Lucius Caecilius Metellus Dalmaticus (consul 119 and Pontifex Maximus), the latter of which was also the father of Sulla's third wife Caecilia Metella.

Lucullus possibly served as military tribune in 89 BC; Plutarch notes that he served as an officer under Sulla during the Social War before his quaestorship. He wrote a history of the war in Greek.

== The longest Quaestura, 88–80 BC ==
Lucullus was elected Quaestor in winter of 89-88 during the same elections Sulla was chosen as Consul with his friend Quintus Pompeius Rufus (whose son was married to Sulla's eldest daughter, Cornelia). Lucullus was probably the Quaestor mentioned as the sole officer in Sulla's army who could stomach accompanying the Consul when he marched on Rome.

In autumn of the same year Sulla sent Lucullus ahead to Greece to assess the situation while he himself oversaw the embarkation of his army. Lucullus arrived in Greece and took over from Quintus Bruttius Sura who had been able to stop the Mithridatic invasion in northern Greece.

When Sulla arrived with the main army, Lucullus served him as a quaestor again; he minted money that was used during the war against Mithridates in southern Greece (87-86 BC). The money Lucullus minted, as per Roman custom, bore his name: the so called Lucullea.

=== The naval venture, 86–85 BC ===
As the Roman siege of Athens was drawing towards a successful conclusion, Sulla's strategic attention began to focus more widely on subsequent operations against the main Pontic forces, and combating Mithridates' control of the sea lanes. He sent Lucullus to collect such a fleet as might be possible from Rome's allies along the eastern Mediterranean seaboard, first to the important but currently disturbed states of Cyrene and Ptolemaic Egypt. Lucullus set out from the Piraeus in mid winter 87-6 BC with three Greek yachts (myoparones) and three light Rhodian biremes, hoping to evade the prevailing sea power of the Pontic fleets and their piratic allies by speed and taking advantage of the worst sailing conditions. He initially made Crete, and is said to have won over the cities to the Roman side. From there he crossed to Cyrene where the famous Hellenic colony in Africa was in dire condition following a vicious and exhausting civil war of nearly seven years' duration. Lucullus' arrival seems to have put a belated end to this terrible conflict, as the first official Roman presence there since the departure of the proconsul Caius Claudius Pulcher, who presided over its initial administrative incorporation into the Roman Republic in 94 BC. He then sailed to Egypt to try and secure ships from king Ptolemy IX Soter II. In Alexandria, Ptolemaic Egypt's capital, he was well received, but there would be no aid or help. Ptolemy had decided to sail a safe course between Rome and Pontus. From Alexandria Lucullus sailed to Cyprus; evading the Cilician pirates, he went to Rhodos (Rome's naval ally). The Rhodians supplied him with additional ships. Rhodos was famous for its naval strength and the marine acumen of its sailors; the Rhodian contingent would turn out to be a most welcome aid. In the waters near Rhodos Lucullus' fleet defeated a Mithridatic contingent. He then secured Cnidus and Cos, drove the Mithridatic military from Chios, and attacked Samos. From there he would work his way North. Lucullus won another victory off Cape Lecton. From Lecton Lucullus sailed to Tenedos where the Mithridatic fleet lay in wait.

After Lucullus had defeated the Mithridatic admiral Neoptolemus in the Battle of Tenedos, he helped Sulla cross the Aegean to Asia. After a peace had been agreed, Lucullus stayed in Asia and collected the financial penalty Sulla imposed upon the province for its revolt. Lucullus, however, tried to lessen the burden that these impositions created.

=== The aftermath of the First Mithridatic War ===
Lucullus is noted for his magnanimous administration of Asia province; he managed to calm Rome's resentful, near rebellious, Asian subjects and establish a modicum of peace. When Asia's Roman governor, Lucius Licinius Murena, started and fought the brief, so-called Second Mithridatic War (83-81 BC), Lucullus was not involved.

Mytilene, capital of the island of Lesbos, rebelled during Lucullus administration of Asia. Lucullus tried to solve the conflict through diplomacy, but eventually he launched an attack on the city state, defeated her militia in a pitched battle in front of her walls and started a siege. After some time Lucullus pretended to give up on the siege and sailed away. When the Mytileneans entered the remnants of his camp, Lucullus ambushed them, killing 500 of the enemy and enslaving 6,000.

== Return to the west, 80–74 BC ==
Lucullus returned in 80 BC and was elected curule aedile for 79, along with his brother Marcus Terentius Varro Lucullus, and gave splendid games.

The most obscure part of Lucullus' public career is the year he spent as praetor in Rome, followed by his governorship of Roman Africa, which probably lasted the usual two-year span for this province in the post-Sullan period. Plutarch's biography entirely ignores this period, 78 BC to 75 BC, jumping from Sulla's death to Lucullus' consulate. However Cicero briefly mentions his praetorship followed by the African command, while the surviving Latin biography, far briefer but more even as biography than Plutarch, comments that he "ruled Africa with the highest degree of justice". This command is significant in showing Lucullus performing the regular, less glamorous, administrative duties of a public career in the customary sequence and, given his renown as a Philhellene, for the regard he showed for subject peoples who were not Greek.

In these respects his early career demonstrates a generous and just nature, but also his political traditionalism in contrast to contemporaries such as Cicero and Pompey, the former of whom was always eager to avoid administrative responsibilities of any sort in the provinces, while Pompey rejected every aspect of a normal career, seeking great military commands at every opportunity which suited him, while refusing to undertake normal duties in peaceful provinces.

Two other notable transactions took place in 76 or 75 BC following Lucullus' return from Africa: his marriage to Claudia, the youngest daughter of Appius Claudius Pulcher, and his purchase of the Marian hilltop villa at Cape Misenum from Sulla's eldest daughter Cornelia.

Sulla dedicated his memoirs to Lucullus, and upon his death made him guardian of his son Faustus and daughter Fausta, preferring Lucullus over Pompey.

=== Consulship ===
In 74 BC, Lucullus served as consul along with Marcus Aurelius Cotta, the half-brother of Aurelia the mother of Julius Caesar. During his consulship he defended Sulla's constitution from the efforts of Lucius Quinctius to undermine it. He supported a plea from Pompey, campaigning against the rebel Sertorius on the Iberian Peninsula, for funds and reinforcements. He was probably also involved in the decision to make Cyrene into a Roman province.

Initially, he drew Cisalpine Gaul as his proconsular command in the lots, but he got himself appointed governor of Cilicia after its governor (Lucius Octavius) died, reputedly by recommendation from Praecia. He also got himself the command of the Third Mithridatic War against Mithridates VI of Pontus. This was a highly sought after command for Mithridates ruled very rich lands.

== The Eastern Wars, 73–67 BC ==
On his way to Cilicia, his proconsular province, Lucullus landed his legion somewhere in Asia province. He initially planned to march from Asia to western Cilicia and invade Pontus from the south. In Asia province he found the two Fimbrian legions, veterans from the previous Mithridatic Wars, waiting for him. Upon hearing the news of Cotta's defeat he set out to relieve the besieged Cotta in Bithynia. Lucullus had to fight Mithridates by land and sea therefore he assembled a large army and also raised a fleet amongst the Greek cities of Asia. With this fleet he defeated the enemy's fleet off Ilium and then off Lemnos. On land, through careful manoeuvring and trickery, he was able to trap Mithridates' army at Cyzicus. According to Appian and Plutarch Lucullus had 30,000 infantry and 1,600-2,500 cavalry while Mithridates was rumoured to have as many as 300,000 men in his force. Since Mithridates had superior numbers Lucullus refused to give battle, he decided to starve his enemy into submission. Lucullus blockaded Mithridates' huge army on the Cyzicus peninsula and let famine and plague do his work for him. Mithridates was able to escape Lucullus's siege, but most of his soldiers perished at Cyzicus.

The Pontic fleet tried to sail east into the Aegean, but Lucullus led his fleet against them. He captured a detachment of 13 ships between the island of Tenedos and the mainland harbour of the Achaeans. The main Pontic force, however, had drawn their ships to shore at a site difficult of approach, the small island of Neae between Lemnos and Scyros; Lucullus then sent infantry by land across Neae to their rear, killing many and forcing the rest back to sea. Lucullus sunk or captured 32 ships of the royal fleet.

Lucullus finished off the Mithridatic army in Bithynia and then moved through Galatia (which was allied to Rome by now) into Pontus. He was wary of drawing into a direct engagement with Mithridates, due to the latter's superior cavalry. However, after several small battles and many skirmishes, Lucullus finally defeated him at the Battle of Cabira. He did not pursue Mithridates immediately, but instead he finished conquering the kingdom of Pontus and setting the affairs of Asia into order. His attempts to reform the rapacious Roman administration in Asia made him increasingly unpopular among the powerful publicani back in Rome.

Mithridates had fled to Armenia and, in 71 BC, Lucullus sent his brother-in-law Appius Claudius Pulcher (later consul in 54 BC) as envoy to the Armenian king-of-kings Tigranes II to demand the surrender of the Pontic king. In the letter conveyed by Appius, Lucullus addressed Tigranes simply as "king" (basileus), something received as an insult, and probably intended as such in order to provoke the proud Armenian monarch to war. Keaveney argues against such an interpretation, arguing that Lucullus was acting as a typical philhellene with no empathy towards the sensibilities of non-Greeks. However, this is refuted by Lucullus' conduct during his administration of Africa (c. 77–75 BC), the period of his career most conspicuously missing from the Greek biography by Plutarch.

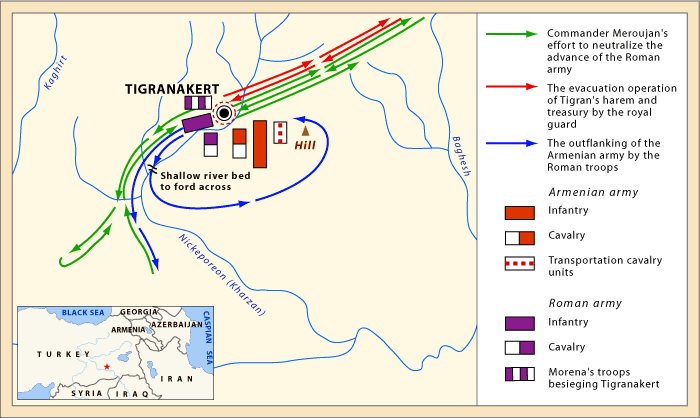
Battle of Tigranocerta, 69 BC

In 69 BC, Lucullus invaded Armenia. He began a siege of the new Armenian imperial capital of Tigranocerta in the Arzenene district. Tigranes returned from mopping up a Seleucid rebellion in Syria with an experienced army which Lucullus nonetheless annihilated at the Battle of Tigranocerta. This battle was fought on the same (pre-Julian) calendar date as the Roman disaster at Arausio 36 years earlier, the day before the Nones of October according to the reckoning of the time (or October 6), which is Julian October 16, 69 BC. Tigranes retired to the northern regions of his kingdom to gather another army and defend his hereditary capital of Artaxata, while Lucullus moved off south-eastwards to the kingdom of the Corduene on the frontiers of the Armenian and Parthian empires. During the winter of 69–68 BC both sides opened negotiations with the Parthian king, Arsaces XVI, who was presently defending himself against a major onslaught from his rival Phraates III coming from Bactria and the far east.

In the summer of 68 BC Lucullus resumed the war against Tigranes, crossing the Anti-Taurus Range in a long march through very difficult mountain country directed at the old Armenian capital Artaxata. A battle took place near the River Arsanias, where Lucullus once again routed the Armenian royal army. However, he had misjudged the time needed for a campaign so far into the Armenian Tablelands, where the good weather was unusually short lived, and when the first snows fell around the time of the autumn equinox his army mutinied and refused to advance any further. Lucullus led them back south to the warmer climes of northern Mesopotamia and had no trouble from his troops there despite setting them the difficult task of capturing the great Armenian fortress of Nisibis, which was quickly stormed and made the Roman base for the winter of 68–67 BC.

That winter Lucullus left his army at Nisibis and, taking a small, but apparently highly mobile, escort, journeyed to Syria in an attempt to permanently exclude Tigranes from all his southern possessions. Syria had been an Armenian province since 83 BC. About a decade later the dispossessed Seleucid princes had spent two years in Rome (one of them probably during Lucullus's consulship in 74 BC) lobbying the Senate and Roman aristocracy to make them (as legitimate Seleucids with a Ptolemaic mother) kings of Egypt in place of the illegitimate Ptolemy XII Auletes. Though these brothers left Rome empty handed in about 72 BC, their plight was not forgotten and Lucullus now elevated one of them as king of Syria: Antiochus XIII, known as Asiaticus owing to the time he had spent living in Roman Asia province. Lucullus' old friend Antiochus of Ascalon accompanied him on this journey and died at Antioch. However, in his absence his authority over his army at Nisibis was seriously undermined by the youngest and wildest of the Claudian brothers, Publius Clodius Pulcher, apparently acting in the interests of Pompey, who was eager to succeed Lucullus in the Mithridatic War command. Although a brother-in-law of Lucullus, Clodius was also frater in some form (whether a first cousin frater consobrinus or uterine brother) of Pompey's wife Mucia Tertia. The long campaigning and hardships that Lucullus' troops had endured for years, combined with a perceived lack of reward in the form of plunder, had caused increasing insubordination. The more daring and ruthless veterans had probably been further encouraged by Lucullus' relatively mild acceptance of their first open mutiny in the Tablelands the previous autumn -especially the so-called Fimbrian legions who had murdered their first commander Lucius Valerius Flaccus and abandoned their second commander Gaius Flavius Fimbria. Instigated by Clodius, a series of demonstrations against the commander took place in his absence and by the time of his return he had largely lost control of his army and could not conduct further offensive operations. In addition Mithridates had returned to Pontus during the same winter, and crushed the garrison force Lucullus had left there under his legates Sornatius Barba and Fabius Hadrianus. Lucullus was left with no choice but to retreat to Pontus and Cappadocia and did so in the spring of 67 BC.

Despite his continuous success in battle, Lucullus had still not captured either one of the monarchs. In 66 BC, with the majority of Lucullus' troops now openly refusing to obey his commands, but agreeing to defend Roman positions from attack, the senate sent Pompey to take over Lucullus' command, at which point Lucullus returned to Rome.

Lucullus established a magnificent library of Greek texts. These books came from the Pontic kingdom of Mithridates VI, which had been seized by Lucullus, who was renowned for his admiration of Greek culture.

== Final years, 66–57 BC ==
The opposition to him continued on his return. In his absence Pompey had shamefully usurped control over Sulla's children, contrary to the father's testament, and now in Pompeius' absence the latter's intimate and hereditary political ally Gaius Memmius co-ordinated the opposition to Lucullus' claim to a triumph. Memmius delivered at least four speeches de triumpho Luculli Asiatico, and the antagonism towards Lucullus aroused by the Pompeians proved so effective that the enabling law (lex curiata) required to hold a triumph was delayed for three years. In this period Lucullus was forced to reside outside the pomerium, which curtailed his involvement in day-to-day politics centred on the Forum.

Instead of returning fully to political life (although, as a friend of Cicero, he did act in some issues) he mostly retired to extravagant leisure, or, in Plutarch's words:

quitted and abandoned public affairs, either because he saw that they were already beyond proper control and diseased, or, as some say, because he had his fill of glory, and felt that the unfortunate issue of his many struggles and toils entitled him to fall back upon a life of ease and luxury...[for] in the life of Lucullus, as in an ancient comedy, one reads in the first part of political measures and military commands, and in the latter part of drinking bouts, and banquets, and what might pass for revel-routs, and torch-races, and all manner of frivolity.

He used the vast treasure he amassed during his wars in the East to live a life of luxury. He had several known luxurious villas:

- the Gardens of Lucullus in Rome
- the vast Villa of Lucullus near Naples
- the famous one near Tusculum
- one on the promontory of Misenum
- one on the island of Nisida in the Bay of Naples.

The one near Neapolis included fish ponds and man-made extensions into the sea, and was only one of many elite senators' villas around the Bay of Naples. Pompey is said by Pliny and Vellleius Paterculus to have referred often to Lucullus as "Xerxes in a toga".

He finally held his triumph in 63 BC thanks in small part to the political manoeuvering of both Cato and Cicero. His triumph was remembered mostly due to his covering the Circus Flaminius with the arms of the enemies he had faced during the campaign. Lucullus also displayed to the Roman public a golden statue of Mithridates VI, standing two meters tall, along with his jewel-encrusted shield, silver vessels, and golden chalices. These items were transported in twenty litters, while mules carried eight expensive klinē.

=== Gastronome ===
Lucullus developed a reputation for banqueting, such that the word Lucullan now means lavish, luxurious and gourmet.

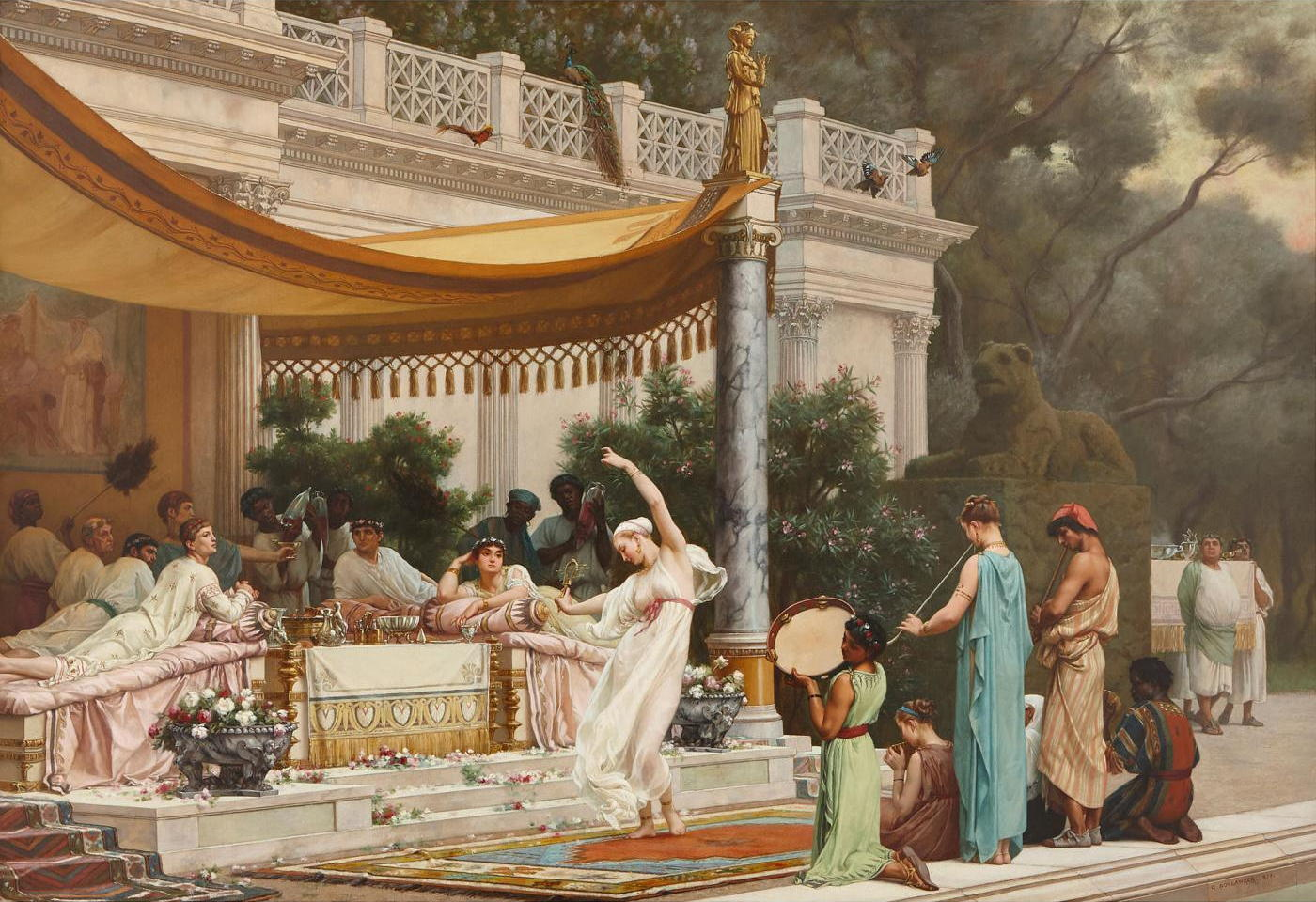
A summer repast at the house of Lucullus (painting by Gustave Boulanger, 1877)

Once, Cicero and Pompey succeeded in inviting themselves to dinner with Lucullus, but, curious to see what sort of meal Lucullus ate when alone, forbade him to communicate with his slaves regarding any preparation of the meal for his guests. However, Lucullus outsmarted them, and succeeded in getting Pompey and Cicero to allow that he specify which room he would be dining in. He ordered that his slaves serve him in the Apollo Room, knowing that his service staff was schooled ahead of time as to the specific details of service he expected for each of his particular dining rooms: as the standard amount specified to be outlaid for any given dinner in the Apollo room was the large sum of 50,000 drachmae, Cicero and Pompey found themselves a short time later dining upon a most unexpectedly luxurious meal.

On another occasion, the tale runs that his steward, hearing that he would have no guests for dinner, served only one not especially impressive course. Lucullus reprimanded him saying, "What, did not you know, then, that today Lucullus dines with Lucullus?"

Among Lucullus' other contributions to fine dining, he was responsible for bringing the sour cherry, (a species of) the sweet cherry and the apricot to Rome, developing major facilities for aquaculture, and being the only person in Rome with the ability to provide thrushes for gastronomic purposes in every season, having his own fattening coops. Cicero once called Lucullus 'Piscinarius' - fish fancier.

Among the various edible plants associated with Lucullus is a cultivar of the vegetable Swiss chard (Beta vulgaris); which is named "Lucullus" in his honour.

=== Lucullus and higher learning ===
Lucullus was extremely well educated in Latin and Greek, and showed a keen interest in literature and philosophy from earliest adulthood. He established lifelong friendships with the Greek poet Archias of (Syrian) Antioch, who migrated to Rome around 102 BC, and with one of the leading academic philosophers of the time, Antiochus of Ascalon.

During his long delay in the royal palace at Alexandria in the summer of 86 BC Lucullus witnessed the beginning of the major schism in the Platonic Academy in the 1st century BC, the so-called Sosos Affair. His friend and companion Antiochos of Ascalon received, evidently from the Library of Alexandria, a copy of a work by the scholarch of the Academy, Philo of Larissa, so radical in its sceptical stance that Antiochos was sufficiently disturbed to doubt the attribution of authorship to his old teacher. But more recent pupils of Philo, chiefly Herakleitos of Tyre, were able to assure him of the book's authenticity. Antiochos and Herakleitos dissected it at length in Lucullus' presence, and in the ensuing weeks while the Roman party continued to await the arrival of the king from the south, Antiochos composed a vigorous polemic against Philo entitled Sosos, which marked his definitive break with Philo's so-called "Sceptical Academy", and the beginning of the separate, more conservative, school eventually called the Old Academy.

=== Decline and death ===
Plutarch reports that Lucullus lost his mind towards the end of his life, intermittently developing signs of insanity as he aged. Plutarch, however, seems to be somewhat ambivalent as to whether the apparent madness was actually the result of the administration of a purported love potion or other explicable cause, hinting that his alleged precipitous mental decline (and his concomitant withdrawal from public affairs) may have been at least in part conveniently feigned in self-protection against the rise to power of his political opponents, such as the popular party, during a time in which the political stakes were often life and death. Lucullus' brother Marcus oversaw his funeral.

His tomb has been located near his villa in Tusculum.

== Marriages ==
Lucullus married Clodia, (one of the daughters of Appius Claudius Pulcher the consul of 79 BC) at the earliest 76 BC. With her he had a daughter and possibly a homonymous son. He divorced her about the year 66 BC, on his return to Rome after friction in Asia with her brother, Publius Clodius Pulcher.

He then married Servilia, the daughter of Livia and Quintus Servilius Caepio, sister of Servilia Major, and half-sister of Cato the Younger; notorious for her loose morals, Servilia cheated on him, but he forced himself to stay with her out of respect for her half-brother Cato. They had a son named Marcus. When Lucullus died he made Cato the guardian of the boy.

== See also ==
- Mithridatic Wars
- Hortensius (Cicero)
- Academica (Cicero)
- Lucullan

| Preceded by Gaius Aurelius Cotta and Lucius Octavius | Consul of the Roman Republic with Marcus Aurelius Cotta; 74 BC | Succeeded by Gaius Cassius Longinus and Marcus Terentius Varro Lucullus |
