= Marcus Aurelius Cotta (consul 74 BC) =

Roman general, politician and consul in 74 BCE

Consul of the Roman Republic
- In office January 74 BC – December 74 BC Serving with Lucius Licinius Lucullus
- Preceded by: Lucius Octavius and Gaius Aurelius Cotta
- Succeeded by: Marcus Terentius Varro Lucullus and Gaius Cassius Longinus Varus

Personal details
- Born: Unknown
- Died: Unknown

Military service
- Allegiance: Roman Republic
- Battles/wars: Third Mithridatic War

Marcus Aurelius Cotta was a Roman politician and general who was consul in 74 BC. He was posted to Bithynia with a Roman fleet as part of the Third Mithridatic War. He was defeated by King Mithridates VI of Pontus. Rescued by his fellow consul, he reduced the Pontic coast and captured the city of Heraclea after a two-year siege. Returning to Rome in 70 BC, Cotta was acclaimed for his victory. However, around 67 BC he was convicted of the misappropriation of war booty and expelled from the Senate, a signal mark of disgrace.

== Family ==
The Roman Republic, shown in dark green, in 40 BC

Cotta, hailing from a distinguished plebeian family, was the son of Lucius Aurelius Cotta who was consul in 119 BC, while his older brother Gaius Aurelius Cotta preceded him as consul in 75 BC. His younger brother Lucius Aurelius Cotta was consul in 65 BC. Aurelia Cotta, the mother of Julius Caesar, was his half-sister.

== Career ==
Climbing the cursus honorum, the sequential mixture of military and political administrative positions held by aspiring politicians in the early Roman Republic, it is assumed that he held the post of praetor in 77. Elected consul in 74 BC alongside Lucius Licinius Lucullus, he was soon concerned with the escalating situation in the east brought about by the acquisition of the new province of Bithynia and the subsequent renewal of conflict with King Mithridates VI of Pontus who had invaded Bithynia. Having received Bithynia as his proconsular command he received command of a fleet to protect his province and was dispatched to the east towards the end of his period as consul.

The original plan was that Cotta should tie down Mithridates' fleet, while Lucullus attacked by land. Cotta was therefore ordered to station his fleet at Chalcedon, while Lucullus marched through Phrygia with the intention of invading Pontus. Lucullus had not advanced far when news came through that Mithridates had made a rapid march westward, attacked Cotta, and forced him to flee behind the walls of Chalcedon. Sixty-four Roman ships had been captured or burnt, and Cotta had lost three thousand men. Cotta was forced to remain in Chalcedon until Lucullus could to come to his rescue. Mithridates left Cotta under siege at Chalcedon while he himself marched his main army westwards. Lucullus caught Mithridates besieging Cyzicus and established a counter-siege successfully trapping Mithridates' army before the city. Famine and disease did the work for Lucullus at the Siege of Cyzicus. Mithridates left his army to its fate and fled by ship to Nicomedia.

Having made his way to Nicomedia, Cotta watched in frustration as Mithridates, learning that his fleet had been destroyed by Lucullus, escaped the city and sailed down the Bosporus to the town of Heraclea Pontica. Joined by Lucullus at Nicomedia in 73, Cotta was assigned the task of securing Lucullus' rear by capturing Heraclea Pontica, which Mithridates had reinforced with 4,000 troops. After reducing the Pontic coast, Cotta began besieging Heraclea Pontica, which took him two years to capture, sacking the city in 71. During this time he dismissed one of his quaestors, P. Oppius, charging him with bribery and conspiracy.

Returning to Rome in 70 BC, Cotta was at first widely acclaimed for his victory at Heraclea Pontica. However, around 67 BC he was accused of appropriation of war booty by Gaius Papirius Carbo. He was convicted of the offence and expelled from the Senate.

== Sources ==
- Anthon, Charles & Smith, William, A New Classical Dictionary of Greek and Roman Biography, Mythology and Geography (1860).
- Birley, A. R., Senators as Generals in Kaiser, Heer und Gesellschaft in der Römischen Kaiserzeit (ed. Eric Birley, Géza Alföldy, Brian Dobson, Werner Eck) (2000) Stuttgart: Steiner. ISBN 9783515076548
- T. Robert S. Broughton, The Magistrates of the Roman Republic, Vol II (1952).
- Holmes, T. Rice, The Roman Republic and the Founder of the Empire, Vol. I (1923)
- Mennen, Inge, Power and Status in the Roman Empire, AD 193–284 (2011) Leiden: Brill. ISBN 9789004203594

Political offices
Preceded by Lucius Octavius and Gaius Aurelius Cotta	Consul of the Roman Republic with Lucius Licinius Lucullus; 74 BC	Succeeded by Marcus Terentius Varro Lucullus and Gaius Cassius Longinus Varus
