= Gaius Marius (consul 82 BC) =

Roman general and politician

Consul of the Roman Republic
- In office 82 BC Serving with Gnaeus Papirius Carbo
- Preceded by: Lucius Cornelius Scipio Asiaticus and Gaius Norbanus
- Succeeded by: Marcus Tullius Decula and Gnaeus Cornelius Dolabella

Personal details
- Born: c. 110 BC
- Died: 82 BC Praeneste
- Spouses: Licinia (m. c. 92 BC); Mucia Tertia (m. c. 82 BC)
- Parents: Gaius Marius (father); Julia (mother)

Military service
- Battles/wars: Social War; Battle of Fucine Lake; Sulla's civil war; Battle of Sacriportus

Gaius Marius "the Younger" (c. 110 BC – 82 BC) was a Roman republican general and politician who became consul in 82 BC with Gnaeus Papirius Carbo. He was the son of the Gaius Marius who was the victor of the Jugurthine and Cimbric wars. He fought in Sulla's civil war. He committed suicide that same year at Praeneste, after his defeat by Sulla and during the city's capture by Quintus Lucretius Afella.

== Biography ==
Marius the Younger was the son (Note: He is sometimes said to be adopted, on the basis of Appian, who first describes him as the son of the great Marius, but in a subsequent passage, says the consul of 82 was the general's nephew. No other ancient sources suggest that the younger Marius was adopted.) of the Gaius Marius who was seven times consul and a famous military commander. His mother, Julia, was an aunt of Julius Caesar. In his youth, Marius was educated with Titus Pomponius Atticus and Marcus Tullius Cicero by Greek tutors. During the Social War, he served under Lucius Porcius Cato, which one source claims Marius killed at the Battle of Fucine Lake over Cato's claims that Cato's achievements were on par with the elder Marius's victory over the Cimbri. Seeking to strengthen his political alliances, the elder Marius married his son to Licinia, a daughter of Lucius Licinius Crassus.

Due to the political turmoil launched by his father in 88 BC to strip his rival Lucius Cornelius Sulla of command of the Roman forces in the First Mithridatic War, the younger Marius accompanied his father into exile when Sulla unexpectedly marched on Rome, forcing them both to flee. At Ostia, young Marius went on ahead of his father and sailed to Africa. There he went to the court of Hiempsal II of Numidia to seek his help against Sulla, but the king decided to hold him captive instead. He managed to escape with the help of one of Hiempsal's concubines whom the young Marius had seduced. He then joined up with his father who had also come to Africa, and they escaped to the Kerkennah Islands.

Learning of Cinna's fight to retain his consulship in 87 BC, father and son returned to Rome, where Marius the elder took control of the situation, gathering an army of slaves and gladiators, and murdering his enemies, both real and imagined. According to Cassius Dio, the younger Marius inaugurated his father's seventh consulship by murdering one plebeian tribune and sending his head to the newly installed consuls, while having another tribune thrown from the heights of the Capitoline Hill. He also banished two praetors, ordering that neither should receive fire or water from any Roman citizen. When his father died of natural causes shortly after taking office, the young Marius assumed leadership of his father's adherents and clients, although overall control of the Marian faction was held by Cinna, who was elected consul for consecutive years until his death in 84 BC. The young Marius is said to have lacked his father's charisma and sought to achieve popularity on the family name.

Marius minor was elected consul for 82 BC and deployed on the frontiers of Latium to oppose Sulla, who had conquered the southern part of Italy after landing in Brundisium the prior year. (Note: In the Chronography of 354, the consul for this year is recorded as Marius’s cousin, Marcus Marius Gratidianus.) This was a political move by Gnaeus Papirius Carbo, his consular colleague and the new leader of the Marians after Cinna died, to drum up popular support and enthusiasm for the war against Sulla; Marius was much too young and had not held the prerequisite magistracies to be a legally elected consul. Two talented and better-qualified men among the Marian faction, his cousin Marius Gratidianus and Quintus Sertorius, were passed over in favor of the younger Marius "in the interest of unity". Many of the old veterans from the elder Marius's former armies came out of retirement. They flocked to the younger Marius's side, and, by the battle of Sacriportus, his army numbered eighty-five cohorts.

At the Battle of Sacriportus, in 82 BC, Sulla and his army defeated the army of Marius. Marius with around 7,000 surviving troops retreated to the fortress city of Praeneste, along with the treasury of the Capitoline temple. Sulla's lieutenant Quintus Lucretius Afella, conducted the siege, throttling the town with a ring of rapidly constructed earth and tuff barricades.

After his defeat, Marius gave orders to allies in Rome to kill a number of Sullan supporters before Rome was captured by Sulla, including his father-in-law, Quintus Mucius Scaevola Pontifex, the ex-consul Lucius Domitius, Publius Antistius and Gaius Carbo. Although both Gnaeus Papirius Carbo and Lucius Junius Brutus Damasippus attempted to break the siege, they were unsuccessful, with relief forces being intercepted and destroyed en route. After receiving news of Sulla's victory at the Battle of the Colline Gate, Marius made one final attempt to escape, this time by digging a tunnel under the walls, but the attempt was uncovered. Marius committed suicide so as not to fall into enemy hands.

In 45 BC, a man referred to as Pseudo-Marius appeared in Rome, claiming to be the son of the younger Marius.

== Sources ==
- Appian (1913). Bella Civilia. Translated by White, Horace. Harvard University Press – via Loeb Classical Library.
- Badian, Ernst (2012). "Marius (RE 15) (2), Gaius". Oxford Classical Dictionary (4th ed.). p. 900.
- Broughton, Thomas Robert Shannon (1952). The magistrates of the Roman republic. Vol. 2. New York: American Philological Association.
- Duncan, Mike (2017). The Storm before the Storm. New York: PublicAffairs. ISBN 978-1-5417-2403-7.
- Hildinger, Erik (2002). Swords against the Senate: the rise of the Roman army and the fall of the Republic (1st Da Capo Press ed.). Cambridge: Da Capo Press. ISBN 0-306-81168-5. OCLC 50882463.
- Münzer, Friedrich (1930). "Marius 15". Realencyclopädie der classischen Altertumswissenschaft (in German). Vol. XIV, 2. Stuttgart: Butcher. cols. 1811–14.
- Smith, William, ed. (1867). Dictionary of Greek and Roman Biography and Mythology.

Political offices
Preceded by L. Cornelius Scipio Asiaticus; Gaius Norbanus	Roman consul 82 BC; With: Gnaeus Papirius Carbo	Succeeded by M. Tullius Decula; Gn. Cornelius Dolabella
