= Lucius Junius Brutus Damasippus =

Roman commander during Sulla's civil war; praetor 82 BC

Lucius Junius Brutus Damasippus was urban praetor in 82 BC during Sulla's civil war. When Pompey joined the Sullans in 83 BC, Brutus was one of the three commanders sent against him. In an unnamed battle, the first of Pompey's career, Brutus was defeated. After the younger Marius' defeat at Sacriportus and retreat to Praeneste in 82 BC, he had Damasippus assemble the Senate and purge it of suspected Sullan sympathisers, leading to the death of four senators. He then joined consul Gnaeus Papirius Carbo in Etruria and attempted to relieve the younger Marius at Praeneste. Sulla had Damasippus killed at the Battle of the Colline Gate.
