= Gaius Papirius Carbo Arvina =

Roman politician and orator (c.124–82 BC)

- Born: c. 124 BC
- Died: 82 BC; Senate house at Rome
- Resting place: Corpse thrown into the Tiber
- Office: Tribune of the plebs (90 BC); Praetor
- Children: Possibly 1 son

Gaius Papirius Carbo Arvina (c. 124 – 82 BC) was a Roman orator and politician. He was an opponent of the reforms championed by the tribune Marcus Livius Drusus and the orator Lucius Licinius Crassus, and held the plebeian tribunate the year following Drusus's murder. He held senior state positions in the interlude between the civil wars of 87 and 83 BC, when his cousin, Gnaeus Carbo, dominated the government. Nevertheless, during the war in 82 his loyalty was seen as suspect, causing Arvina to be murdered by government agents during a meeting of the Senate.

== Life ==
Gaius Papirius Carbo Arvina belonged to a large generation of Roman orators whose members were all born around 124 BC and flourished during the youth of Cicero. He came from a family (the Papirii Carbones) which was prominent in Roman politics and the Senate during the late 2nd century and early 1st century BC. His father, Gaius Papirius Carbo, consul in 120 BC, had been an ally of the Gracchi brothers, deserting their cause after their deaths, only to commit suicide in 119 BC after being prosecuted by the young and rising orator Lucius Licinius Crassus.

Arvina grew up with bitter resentment for Crassus and was said to have conceived a lifelong enmity towards him. In 94 BC, Arvina followed Crassus to Gaul, of which the latter had been appointed governor, with the secret intention of gathering evidence with which he might prosecute Crassus for maladministration. Not only did Carbo find nothing incriminating within the governor's impeccable administration, but Crassus found out about Carbo's intentions and decided, to the surprise of later commentators, to incorporate him into his close circle of advisors. As a result, "the keen and bitter Carbo got nothing from his trip to Gaul, except the realization that his father had been guilty and had been sent into exile by a man of complete integrity".

In 91 BC, Carbo Arvina was an opponent of the abortive political reforms promoted by Crassus and his pupil, the tribune Marcus Livius Drusus. The following year he was a tribune of the plebs, and was very frequently seen giving speeches in the Rostra (denouncing Drusus, who had been murdered the previous year, in one of them).

During the interlude between the civil wars of 87 and 82 BC, Arvina made some rare appearances in the courts as an advocate; Cicero describes him as one of the few orators of note still active at the time. He cooperated carefully with the government at the time, which was dominated by Cornelius Cinna and Arvina's cousin, Gnaeus Carbo, and held the office of praetor in one of those years. In 82 BC, during the government's civil war against the renegade general Sulla, the faction in power became suspicious of Arvina's loyalty, notwithstanding his relation to the consul Gnaeus Carbo, and arranged for him and other unreliable senators to be murdered during a senate meeting in the Curia Hostilia. According to Appian, he was slain while still seated. His head was torn off, affixed to a cross, and set up on public display, whereas his corpse was thrown into the Tiber river.

Cicero, who heard the tribunes of 90 BC speak in the popular assemblies, identified Arvina as a second class orator, and described his style of rhetoric as follows: "his language was tolerably nervous, he spoke with ease, and there was an air of authority in his address that was perfectly natural". Cicero also considered him the only member of the Papirius Carbo family who was a good citizen. Arvina may be the father of Gaius Papirius Carbo, a senator condemned for extortion while as governor of Bithynia.
