= Battle of the Baetis River =

Battle of the Sertorian War (80 BCE)

- Part of the Sertorian War
Date	80 BC
Location	the estuary of the Baetis River (modern day: Guadalquivir) in Hispania
Result	Sertorian victory

Belligerents
Sertorius' rebels	Roman Republic

Commanders and leaders
Quintus Sertorius	Lucius Fufidius

Strength
8,000+ men: 2,600 Romans; 700 North Africans; 4,700 Lusitanians	Unknown, but probably outnumbering the Sertorians

Casualties and losses
Unknown, but probably lower	2,000

The Battle of the Baetis River was fought between an army of the Roman Republic and a rebel army at the Baetis river (modern day Guadalquivir) in Spain. The battle took place in 80 BC at the start of the Sertorian War. The Romans were led by Lucius Fufidius, while the rebels were led by the Roman rebel Quintus Sertorius. The rebel army was victorious, gaining Sertorius control over Hispania Ulterior.

== Background ==
In 82 BC, during Sulla's civil war, Sertorius left Italy for his assigned propraetorian province in Hispania. Unfortunately, his faction, the Marians, lost the war in Italy right after his departure and in 81 BC Sulla sent Gaius Annius Luscus with several legions to take the Iberian provinces from Sertorius. After a brief resistance Sertorius and his men were expelled from Hispania. They ended up in Mauretania, in north-western Africa, where they conquered the city of Tingis. Here the Lusitanians, a fierce Iberian tribe who were about to be invaded by a Sullan governor, approached him. They requested Sertorius to become their war leader in the fight against the Sullans. Sertorius accepted the request and late in 80 BC Sertorius landed at the little fishing town of Baelo near the Pillars of Hercules (Gibraltar) thus returning to Hispania for the third and final time.

== Prelude ==
Sertorius made a camp on a mountain near Baelo and started gathering his forces. He had brought 2,600 Romans soldiers (mainly veterans from the Social and Civil Wars) and 700 North African adventurers and mercenaries. The Lusitanians sent him 4,700 of their warriors. Added to this were an unknown number of disaffected local Romans, Turdetani, Celtiberians, and Roman and Italian refugees. All in all, Sertorius had an army of over 8,000 men. It fell to Fufidius, the aforementioned governor of Hispania Ulterior, to do something about the rebels in his province. So he marched his army, which was already assembled for the invasion of Lusitania, toward Baelo. Sertorius was an active commander and decided not to wait for Fufidius, but marched his little army east. The two forces met at the estuary of the Baetis River.

== Battle ==
The Baetis estuary was a swampy maze which favoured those with local knowledge. As a number of Sertorius' men were locals, he had the upper hand. The only fragmentary description we have is from Sallust:

Afterwards, Fufidius arrived with his legions. He discovered that the banks of the river were steep, and if they had to fight, the ford would be hard to get across. Everything favoured his enemies more than his own side

Fufidius lost two thousand men, and the greater part of further Hispania along with them. He survived the battle, but vanished into obscurity, remembered mainly as the man who had lost Hispania to Sertorius.

== Aftermath ==
Sertorius' victory marked the start of Sertorian war which would ravage the Iberian Peninsula for the next eight years. He would outgeneral every Republican commander sent against him and destroyed several of their armies. At the height of his power Sertorius ruled almost all of the Iberian Peninsula. The war would only come to an end when a number of Sertorius' own men became disgruntled, conspired against him and assassinated him during a banquet.
