= Quintus Lucretius Afella =

Roman general

Quintus Lucretius Afella was a Roman general who served under the command of Lucius Cornelius Sulla during Sulla's second march on Rome. A loyal legate who expected to be awarded a consulship for his part in Sulla's campaign, he was executed when he tried to defy his master's dictate.

== Career ==
Afella was one of Sulla's legates during Sulla's second march on Rome. Apparently a trusted and talented general, Sulla entrusted the siege of Praeneste to him during the campaign, confident that Afella could defeat Marius the Younger, trapped inside the city's walls. Afella settled down to await the city's eventual surrender, confident that Sulla would win the rest of the campaign.

During the Battle of the Colline Gate, the left wing of Sulla's army collapsed, and many of them fled all the way to Praeneste, panicked, shouting fearfully that Sulla was dead, Rome in the possession of the enemy, and that the siege of Praeneste must be lifted so they could all retreat. Afella chose to stand pat, certain Sulla had not lost the battle.

This proved the correct decision, as Sulla, ably assisted by Marcus Licinius Crassus, had won the battle and the city. Sulla, in control of the city and the Senate, forced them to appoint him dictator and continued his campaign to crush the last pockets of resistance. Afella soon forced the surrender of Praeneste and presented his master with the head of the younger Marius.

Sulla decided to dispense with elections during his dictatorship, selecting which candidates were to be elected. During the first of these mock elections, he passed over Afella. Outraged, Afella began to canvass for the consulship on his own, gathering support. Sulla attempted to stop him, but when Afella entered the Forum with a large party, Sulla gave up. He sent one of his centurions down to execute Afella.

The centurion followed his orders to the letter and was seized by the crowd. Dragging the centurion to Sulla's tribunal atop the temple of Castor and Pollux, where the dictator had watched the deed carried out, the crowd demanded Sulla condemn the man.

Sulla shrugged off the crowd, bidding them stop their noise, bluntly informing them that he had ordered the task to be done, and that the crowd release his centurion. He concluded his admonition with a cautionary tale: "The lice were very troublesome to a clown, as he was ploughing. Twice he stopped his ploughing and purged his jacket. But he was still bitten, and in order that he might not be hindered in his work, he burnt the jacket; and I advise those who have been twice humbled not to make fire necessary the third time."

== See also ==
- Lucretia gens
