= Gaius Norbanus =

Roman statesman, consul in 83 BC

Consul of Rome
- In office 1 January – 29 December 83 BC Serving with Lucius Cornelius Scipio Asiaticus
- Preceded by: Lucius Cornelius Cinna & Gnaeus Papirius Carbo
- Succeeded by: Gaius Marius the Younger & Gnaeus Papirius Carbo

Personal details
- Died: 82 BC Rhodes
- Cause of death: Suicide
- Party: Populares

Military service
- Allegiance: Roman Republic
- Branch/service: Roman army
- Rank: General

Gaius Norbanus, nicknamed Balbus (died 82 BC) was a Roman politician who was elected consul in 83 BC alongside Lucius Cornelius Scipio Asiaticus. He committed suicide in exile at Rhodes after being proscribed by Lucius Cornelius Sulla shortly after the latter's victory in the civil war.

== Life ==
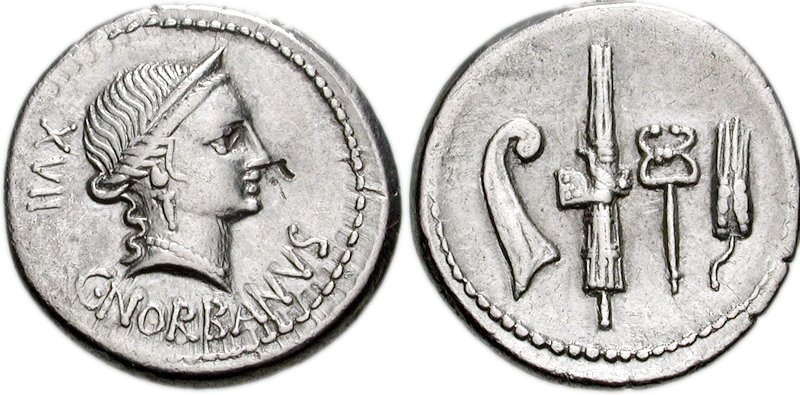
A coin of Norbanus depicting Venus

A novus homo, Gaius Norbanus first came to prominence when he was elected one of the plebeian tribunes for 103 BC. He achieved notoriety for his prosecution of Quintus Servilius Caepio, where he accused Servilius Caepio of incompetence and dereliction of duty at the catastrophic defeat of the Roman armies by the Cimbri at the Battle of Arausio in 105 BC. (Note: It has traditionally been believed that Norbanus also prosecuted Servilius Caepio of having plundered the temple of Tolosa, and arranged for the theft of the Gold of Tolosa on its way to Rome. However, Broughton has argued that the commission that investigated Caepio’s involvement in the missing gold occurred in 104 BC, the year before Norbanus’ indictment of Caepio for his actions at Arausio. See Broughton I, pgs. 565-566) At the concilium plebis where Servilius Caepio was tried, two tribunes attempted to veto proceedings, but were driven off by force. Although the Senate vigorously tried to obtain his acquittal and he was defended by Lucius Licinius Crassus, Norbanus managed to secure Caepio's conviction. Caepio was forced into exile to Smyrna, while his fortune was confiscated.

In 101 BC, Norbanus served as quaestor under Marcus Antonius, grandfather of the triumvir Mark Antony, in his campaign against the pirates in Cilicia. In 94 BC, Norbanus was accused of minuta maiestas (treason) under the Lex Appuleia by Publius Sulpicius Rufus on account of the disturbances that had taken place at the trial of Caepio, but the eloquence of Marcus Antonius secured his acquittal.

This was followed by his election as Praetor in 89 BC, and his appointment as governor of Sicily. He kept the peace in his province, defending it against the Italian socii during the Social War. He managed to capture Rhegium from the Samnites in 88 BC.

During the civil war between Gaius Marius and Lucius Cornelius Sulla he sided with Marius. He was elected consul for 83 BC; at Mount Tifata, near Capua, he intercepted Sulla, who had returned to Italy from Greece. Sulla sent over some emissaries to discuss coming to terms with Norbanus, but they were thrown out when it became apparent that they were trying to suborn Norbanus’ men, who were mostly raw recruits. Although Norbanus was helped by Quintus Sertorius, they were defeated by Sulla at the Battle of Mount Tifata, losing around 6,000 men in the process. He managed to regroup his shattered army at Capua, whereupon he eventually retreated to Cisalpine Gaul. He and Gnaeus Papirius Carbo were defeated by Quintus Caecilius Metellus Pius at Faventia. Norbanus was betrayed by one of his legates, Publius Albinovanus, who murdered many of Norbanus’ principal officers after inviting them to dinner before surrendering Ariminium to Metellus Pius.

Norbanus himself did not attend Albinovanus' invitation, and he managed to evade capture, fleeing to Rhodes. After proscription by Sulla, he committed suicide in the middle of a market-place, while the leading citizens of Rhodes were debating whether to hand him over to Sulla's men.

== Sources ==
- Broughton, T. Robert S., The Magistrates of the Roman Republic, Vols. I & II (1951)
- Broughton, T. Robert S., The Magistrates of the Roman Republic, Vol. III (1986)
- Duncan, Mike (2017). The Storm before the Storm. New York: PublicAffairs. ISBN 978-1-5417-2403-7.
- Evans, Richard (1987). "Norman Flacci: The Consuls of 38 and 24 BC". Historia: Zeitschrift für Alte Geschichte. 36: 121–128.
- A. H. J. Greenidge, History of Rome.
- Theodor Mommsen, History of Rome, bk. iv. ch. v.;
- Smith, William, Dictionary of Greek and Roman Biography and Mythology, Vol I (1867).

Political offices
Preceded by Gnaeus Papirius Carbo; Lucius Cornelius Cinna	Roman consul 83 BC with Lucius Cornelius Scipio Asiaticus	Succeeded by Gaius Marius the Younger; Gnaeus Papirius Carbo
