= Battle of Fucine Lake =

88 BCE battle

- Part of Social War
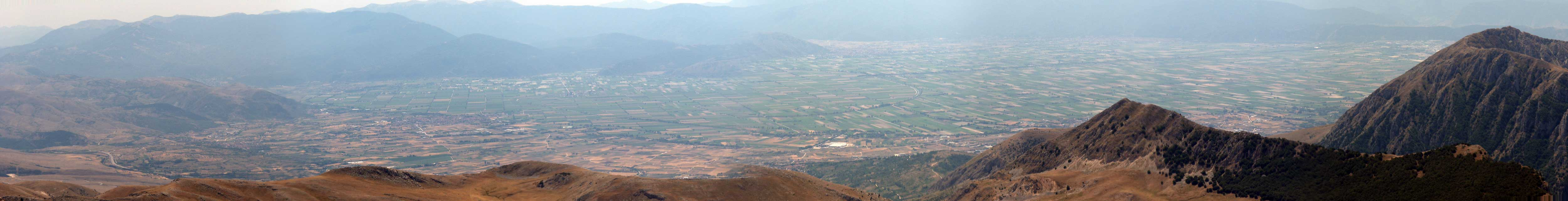
- Panoramic view of ex Fucino lake, Abruzzo, Italy, from Sirente mountain
Date	89 BC
Location	Fucine Lake 41°59′42″N 13°32′50″E
Result	Rebel victory

Belligerents
Italian rebels	Roman Republic

Commanders and leaders
	Lucius Porcius Cato †
- Location within Italy

The Battle of Fucine Lake was fought in 89 BC between a Roman army and a rebel force during the Social War. Lucius Porcius Cato was the leader of the Roman army at this battle. The consul Porcius Cato was defeated and killed while storming a Marsic camp in winter or early spring.

A slingshot from the presumed battlefield with an inscription in the Venetic language that mentions a Floro Decio attests the presence of Venetic troops at this battle.
