= Lucius Cornelius Scipio Asiaticus (consul 83 BC) =

1st-century BC Roman senator and military leader

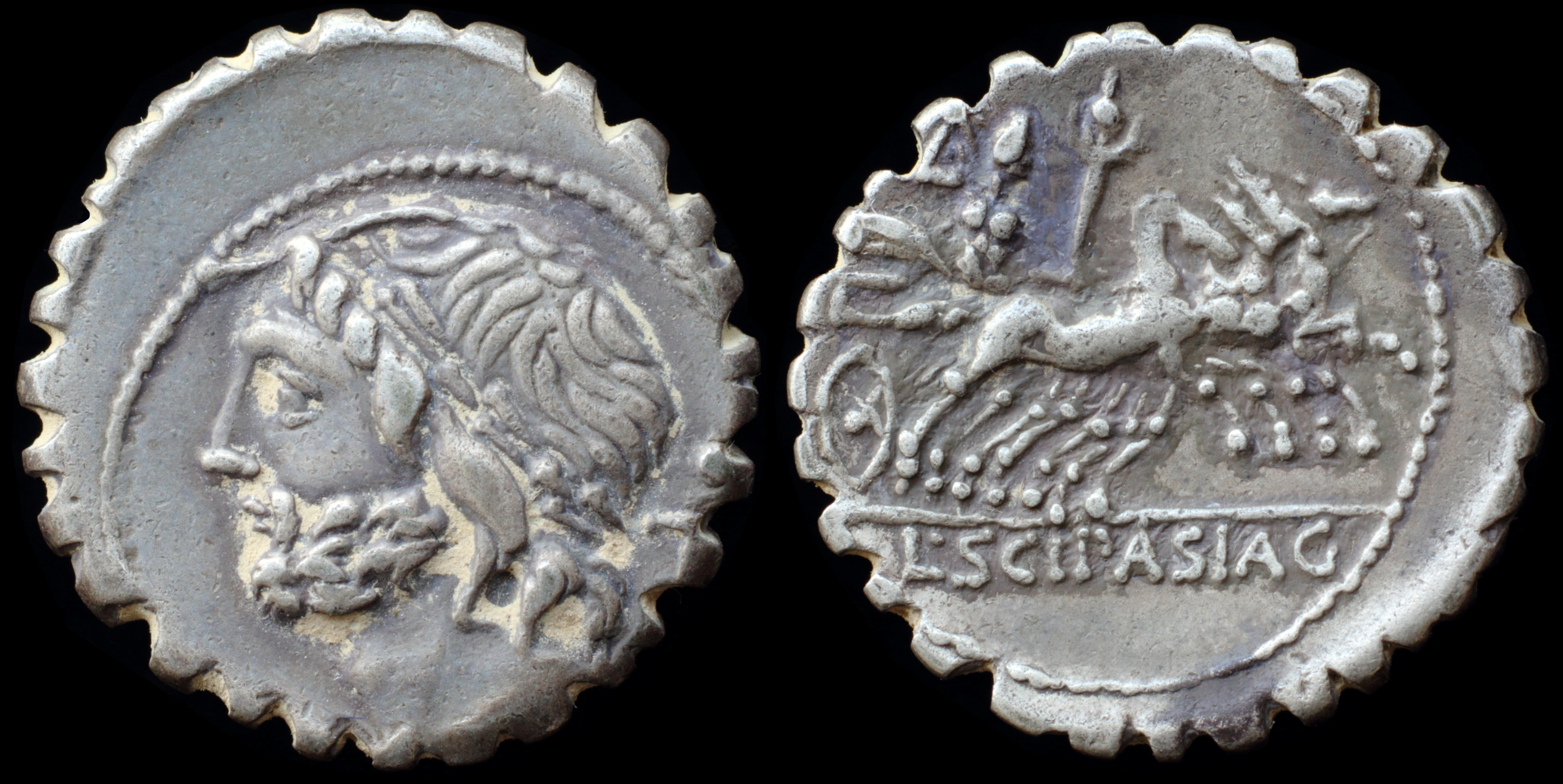

First side of the image: O: laureate head of Jupiter T behind (off flan)
Second side of the image: R: Jupiter driving quadriga, holding scepter and hurling thunderbolt L·SCIP·ASIAG
Silver serrate denarius struck by Lucius Cornelius Scipio Asiaticus in Rome 106 BC. Cornelia 24c; Syd 576a; Cr311/1c.

Lucius Cornelius Scipio Asiaticus (fl. 82 BC; also called Scipio Asiagenes) was a great-grandson of Lucius Cornelius Scipio Asiaticus, consul in 190 BC, who was victor of the Battle of Magnesia (189 BC).

Scipio Asiaticus, also known as Scipio Asiagenes, was co-consul with Gaius Norbanus in 83 BC.

This Scipio is first mentioned in 100 BC, when he took up arms with the other members of the Roman Senate against Lucius Appuleius Saturninus. In the Social War he was stationed with Lucius Acilius in the town of Aesernia, escaping in the dress of slaves during the approach of Vettius Scato. He belonged to the party of Marius and Carbo during Sulla's civil war. In 83 BC he was appointed consul with Gaius Norbanus. In this year Lucius Cornelius Sulla returned to the Italian Peninsula, and advanced against the consuls. He defeated Norbanus in Italy, and convinced the troops of Scipio to desert their general.

He was taken prisoner in his camp along with his son Lucius, but was dismissed by Sulla uninjured. He was, however, included in the proscription in the following year, 82 BC, whereupon he fled to Massilia, where he passed the remainder of his life. His daughter was married to Publius Sestius. Cicero speaks favourably of the oratorical powers of Scipio Asiaticus.

Political offices
Preceded by Gn. Papirius Carbo; L. Cornelius Cinna	Roman consul 83 BC; With: Gaius Norbanus	Succeeded by G. Marius the Younger; Gn. Papirius Carbo
