= Lucius Porcius Cato =

Roman general and politician

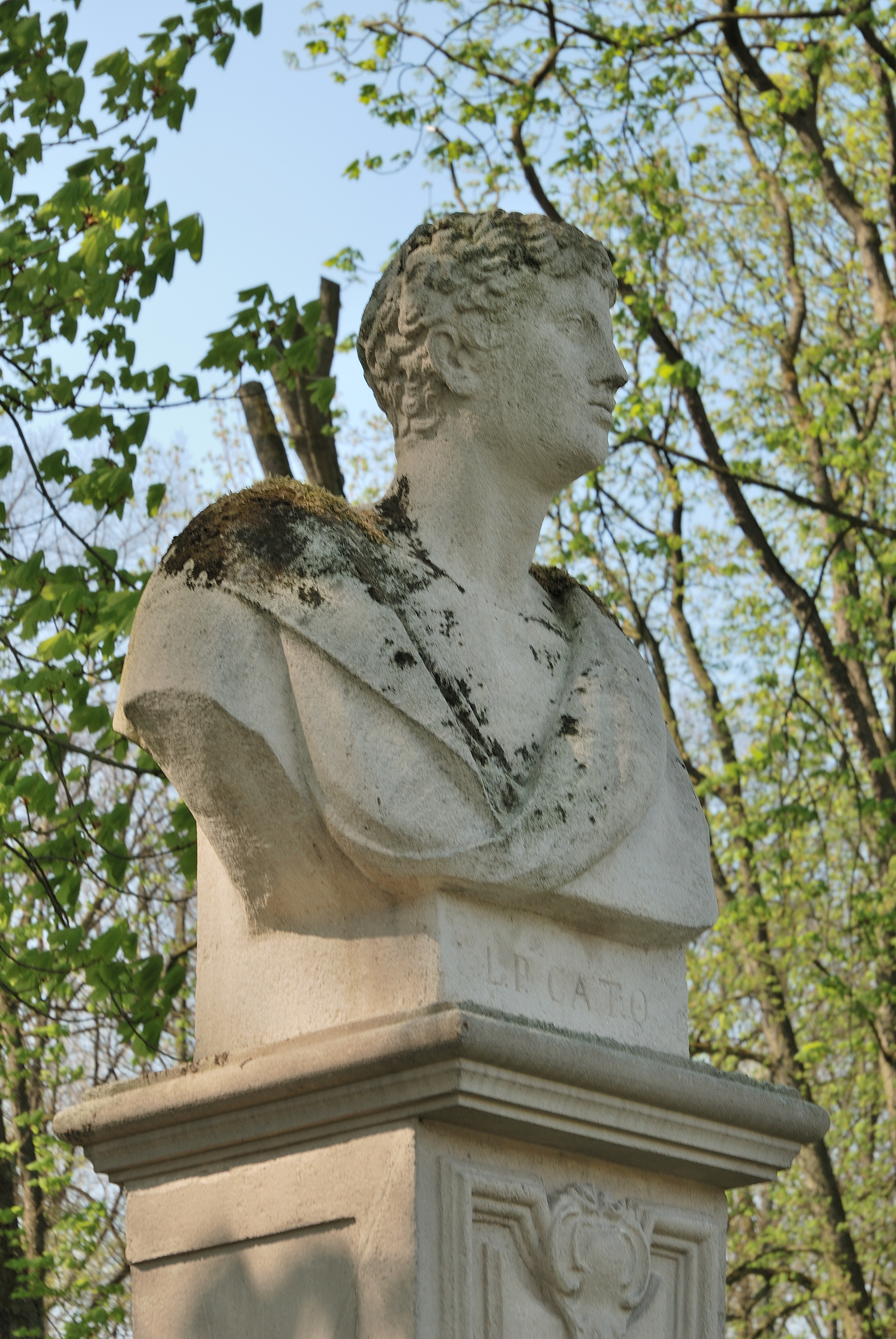
- Bust of Lucius Porcius Cato at Nordkirchen, Germany

Consul of the Roman Republic
- In office 89 BC served with Gnaeus Pompeius Strabo Serving with Gnaeus Pompeius Strabo
- Preceded by: Lucius Julius Caesar and Publius Rutilius Lupus
- Succeeded by: Lucius Cornelius Sulla and Quintus Pompeius Rufus

Personal details
- Died: 89 BC Fucine Lake
- Relations: Porcia gens
- Parent: M. Porcius Cato Salonianus

Military service
- Allegiance: Rome
- Commands: the southern theatre in the Social War
- Battles/wars: Social War; Battle of Fucine Lake †

Lucius Porcius Cato was a Roman general and politician who became consul in 89 BC alongside Gnaeus Pompeius Strabo. He died at the Battle of Fucine Lake, possibly at the hands of Gaius Marius the Younger.

== Biography ==
Lucius Porcius Cato was a son of Marcus Porcius Cato Salonianus. He was elected praetor in 92 BC. In 90 BC, during the Social War, he was given a propraetoral command and defeated an Etruscan army which had joined the revolt. He was elected consul in 89 BC, alongside Pompey Strabo, and took over the southern command from Lucius Caesar. Although his troops were undisciplined and mutinied at one point, he managed to inflict a defeat on them early on. However, at the Battle of Fucine Lake in the winter of 89 BC, he was winning an engagement with the Marsi when he was killed near the end of the battle, in an attempt to storm the enemy camp, leading to a Marsic victory. Although it is usually assumed that he was killed by Marsic soldiers, at least one source states that he was killed by Gaius Marius the Younger, the son of the famous Roman general and politician, Gaius Marius, who was furious that Cato had boasted that his own achievements were on par with the elder Marius's victory over the Cimbri.

== Cultural depictions ==
The circumstances surrounding his death constitute a subplot in the second novel of the Australian novelist Colleen McCullough's Masters of Rome series, The Grass Crown.

== Sources ==
- Broughton, T. Robert S. (1952). The magistrates of the Roman Republic. American Philological Association. OCLC 1120836609.
- Smith, William (1849). Dictionary of Greek and Roman biography and mythology. C.C. Little and J. Brown. OCLC 669193927.
- Orosius, Paulus (2001). The Seven Books of History Against the Pagans. Catholic University of America Press. ISBN 0-8132-1150-6. OCLC 1154935578.

Political offices
Preceded by Lucius Julius Caesar and Publius Rutilius Lupus	Consul of the Roman Republic with Gnaeus Pompeius Strabo; 89 BC	Succeeded by Lucius Cornelius Sulla and Quintus Pompeius Rufus
