= Battle of Sacriportus =

82 BC conflict in Sulla's Second Civil War

- Part of Sulla's Second Civil War
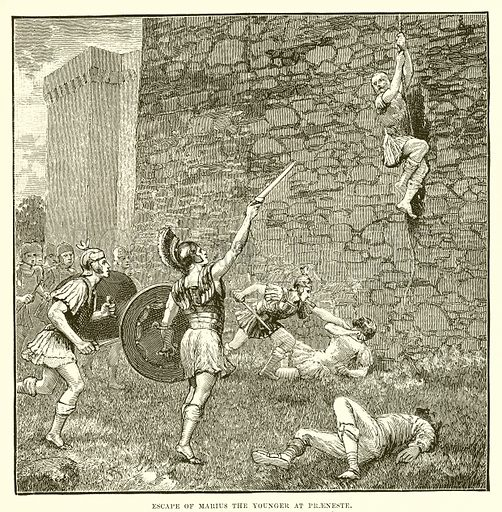
- Marius the Younger fleeing to Praeneste
Date	April, 82 BC
Location	Sacriporto, Italia
Result	Optimate Victory

Belligerents
Optimates (Sullan Faction)	Populares (Cinna-Marius Faction)

Commanders and leaders
Lucius Cornelius Sulla Felix	Gaius Marius the Younger

Strength
40,000 Legionaries	45,000 Legionaries

Casualties and losses
Low	~15,000 Killed

The Battle of Sacriportus, also called the Battle of Sacriporto, took place in April of 82 BC during Sulla's Second Civil War. The battle pitted the Optimates under the command of Lucius Cornelius Sulla Felix against the Populares forces commanded by Gaius Marius the Younger. The battle resulted in a decisive Optimate victory.

== Context ==
After signing the peace treaty at Dardanos, Sulla returned to Italy at the head of his battle-hardened army with the intention of confronting his political opponents, the Populares. They were led by Gaius Marius the Younger and by Gnaeus Papirius Carbo. Sulla therefore invaded Italia in 83 BC, routing various Populares armies. Encamping for the winter, both sides made preparations to continue the fighting in spring.

== Battle ==
One night in April, Sulla had a dream that Gaius Marius told his son, Gaius Marius the Younger, that he should not give battle to Sulla's forces the following day. Encouraged by this premonition, Sulla decided to immediately give combat and called on Gnaeus Cornelius Dolabella, who was encamped nearby. Dolabella's army was exhausted from marching in an intense rainstorm and the military tribunes had ordered that the army make camp rather than give battle. Emboldened by the enemy's lack of offensive action, Gaius Marius decided to attack thinking he would be able to surprise the Optimates and win the day. Sulla's veterans simply stuck their pila into the ground to create a makeshift barricade, drew their swords, formed battle lines and counter-attacked. The Sullans' counter-attack put the Marians on the defensive, eventually, the Marian left began to waver and either slowly or speedily (the accounts differ) they were driven back. In the end five cohorts of foot and two of horse deserted to Sulla, causing a general collapse. Marius' army scattered in rout. Marius lost 28,000 men (killed, captured, turned coat or fled) while Sulla claimed to have only lost 23 men.

== Consequences ==
The surviving Populares forces, including Marius, took refuge at Praeneste to escape the pursuing Sullan forces. Sulla arrived shortly thereafter and besieged the city. The city held out until all of Italy was under Sulla's direct control; it fell on 4 November.

== See also ==
- List of Roman wars and battles
