= Gnaeus Papirius Carbo (consul 85 BC) =

Roman politician and general

- Born: c. 129 BC
- Died: 82 BC (aged c. 47); Lilybaeum, Sicily
- Cause of death: Executed by Pompey
- Office: Consul (85–84 BC, 82 BC)

Military service
- Allegiance: Marius and Cinna
- Commands: Bellum Octavianum; Sulla's civil war

Gnaeus Papirius Carbo (c. 129 – 82 BC) was thrice consul of the Roman Republic in 85, 84, and 82 BC. He was the head of the Marianists after the death of Cinna in 84 and led the resistance to Sulla during the civil war. He was proscribed by Sulla and beheaded by Pompey in Sicily in late 82.

== Life ==
A nephew of Gaius Papirius Carbo (consul for 120 BC), he was a strong supporter of the Marian faction, and took part in the blockade of Rome (87 BC). In 85 BC he was chosen by Lucius Cornelius Cinna as his colleague in the consulship, and extensive preparations were made for carrying out war in Greece against Lucius Cornelius Sulla, who had announced his intention of returning to Italy. Cinna and Carbo declared themselves consuls for the following year, and large bodies of troops were transported across the Adriatic Sea; but when Cinna was murdered by his own soldiers after a major shipwreck, Carbo was obliged to bring them back.

He spent most of 84 BC bolstering his forces in Italy. Convincing the Italians that Sulla would reverse their citizenship and voting rights, it was not difficult for Carbo to raise forces. The urban plebs, moreover, feared of Sulla's response to a second civil war after hearing of Sulla's vicious sacks of Greek cities. He orchestrated the election of his successors, Scipio Asiaticus and Gaius Norbanus to the consulship for 83 BC and assumed the proconsulship of the nearby province of Cisalpine Gaul. Shortly thereafter, he induced the Senate to deliver a senatus consultum ultimum declaring Sulla an enemy of the state and giving the consuls, Asiaticus and Norbanus, the province of Italy.

When Sulla returned from the east in the spring of 83 BC, he defeated Norbanus at the Battle of Mount Tifata, forcing his army to flee to Capua, and induced large defections from Asiaticus' army. Sulla captured Asiaticus, set him free to show his benevolence, and Norbanus extricated himself from Capua. In response to these setbacks, Carbo marched south from Cisalpine Gaul, but the Marian-allied forces were unable to mount an effective defence against Sulla and his allies.

Carbo induced the Assembly to elect him and Gaius Marius the Younger to the consulship for 82 BC. Carbo went north to Etruria to fight Sulla's allies Metellus and Pompey, while Marius the Younger marched on Sulla himself. Marius marched his army south-east into Campania and met Sulla's forces at Sacriportus (near Signia). The Battle of Sacriportus ended with Marius' army being routed (Marius lost 28,000 men; they were either killed, captured, turned coat or fled. Sulla claimed to have only lost 23 men). Marius survived the battle and with 7,000 men he retreated to Praeneste. Although he still had a large army and the Samnites remained faithful to him, Carbo saw that Sulla had won the balance of the conflict. Unable to relieve Praeneste he decided to leave Italy, ostensibly to raise forces in Africa, but never made it farther than Sicily. In 81 BC Sulla sent Pompey to Sicily with a large force (six legions, 120 warships and 800 transport ships). Carbo was soon discovered and arrested by Pompey, who "treated Carbo in his misfortunes with an unnatural insolence", taking Carbo in fetters to a tribunal he presided over, examining him closely "to the distress and vexation of the audience", and finally, sentencing him to death.

Although most notable for his role in the chaotic 80s, Carbo had also made a name for himself prior to that period, particularly during his tenure as Tribune of the Plebs in 92 BC. Under his supervision, and with his apparent encouragement, a meeting of the people broke down into disorder. The event was considered significant enough by the Senate to warrant a decree, championed by Lucius Licinius Crassus, placing responsibility for public disorder with the presiding officer; this decree was apparently still active forty years later in the time of Cicero.

As with several of the notable politicians of the 90s and 80s BC, such as Publius Sulpicius, Marcus Antonius the Orator, and Lucius Crassus, Carbo had a reputation for effective oratory. For instance, Cicero writes of one occasion when Carbo made use of a certain clausula (a dichoreus or double trochee – u – x), which was so effective that the audience all gave a shout.

== Sources ==
- Duncan, Mike (2017). The Storm before the Storm. New York: PublicAffairs. ISBN 978-1-5417-2403-7. Details a broad narrative history from the death of the Gracchi brothers to the dictatorship of Sulla.
- Konrad, C.F. (1994). Plutarch's Sertorius: A Historical Commentary. Chapel Hill: University of North Carolina Press. ISBN 0-8078-2139-X.
- Schmitz, Leonhard (1849). "Carbo" . In Smith, William (ed.). Dictionary of Greek and Roman Biography and Mythology. Vol. 1. London: John Murray. pp. 610–612.
- Appian, Bell. Civ. i. 67-98
- Livy, Epit. 79, 84, 88, 89
- Plutarch, Pompey, 5, 6, 10, and Sulla, 28
- Cicero, ad Fam. ix. 21
- Eutropius, v. 8, 9
- Orosius, v. 20
- Valerius Maximus, v. 3. 5, ix

Political offices
Preceded by L. Cornelius Cinna; L. Valerius Flaccus	Roman consul 85–84 BC; With: L. Cornelius Cinna	Succeeded by L. Cornelius Scipio Asiaticus; Gaius Norbanus
Preceded by L. Cornelius Scipio Asiaticus; Gaius Norbanus	Roman consul 82 BC; With: Gaius Marius the Younger	Succeeded by M. Tullius Decula; Cn. Cornelius Dolabella
