= Battle of Mount Tifata =

82 BCE battle

- Part of Sulla's Second Civil War
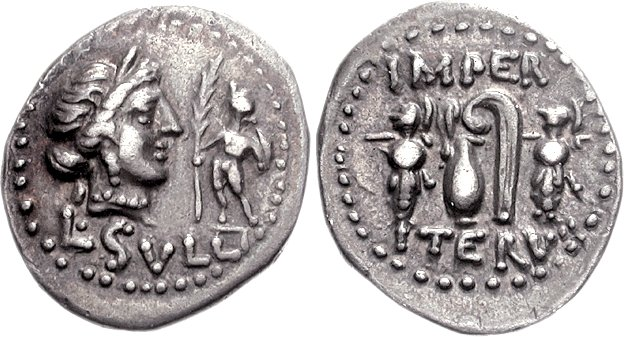
- Sulla Coin
| Date | November 83 BC |
| Location | near Mount Tifata 41°03′57″N 14°10′12″E |
| Result | Sullan victory |

Belligerents
| Optimates | Populares |

Commanders and leaders
| Lucius Cornelius Sulla | Gaius Norbanus |

Strength
| 40,000 | 60,000 |

Casualties and losses
| 124 killed | 7,000 killed 6,000 captured |
- Location within Italy

The Battle of Mount Tifata was fought in 83 BC as part of Sulla's Second Civil War.

== History ==
It was fought in the foothills of Mount Tifata, a spur of the Apennines, close to the River Vulturnus, and is alternatively known as the Battle of Casilinum. The location of the battle suggests that Sulla was moving on Capua. The Optimate forces were led by Lucius Cornelius Sulla and his officer Quintus Caecilius Metellus, while the Populares were led by Gaius Norbanus. The battle started when Sulla “immediately attacked” Norbanus, even though Velleius claims Norbanus attacked Sulla. As an army under Scipio was currently moving to support Norbanus it is likely that Sulla attacked Norbanus by surprise before he could link up with Scipio. In total, Scipio's and Norbanus’ armies numbered 100,000 as compared to at most 40,000 under Sulla. At Mount Tifata, Sulla had the bulk of his army with him, while Norbanus commanded 60,000 men (the rest were with Scipio). Sulla was victorious.
