= Sulla's civil war =

Internal conflict in the Roman Republic, c. 83-82 BC

- Part of the crisis of the Roman Republic
Date	83–82 BC; Marian resistance, led by Sertorius, in Hispania not completely quelled until 72 BC
Location	Italia, Sicily, Africa
Result	Sullan victory

Belligerents
Sullans	Marians

Commanders and leaders
Sulla; Q. Caecilius Metellus Pius; Pompey; Marcus Licinius Crassus; Marcus Lucullus; Gn. Cornelius Dolabella; Marcus Aemilius Lepidus	Gn. Papirius Carbo †; Gaius Norbanus †; Gaius Marius †; Scipio Asiaticus; Gaius Carrinas †; G. Marcius Censorinus †; L. Junius Damasippus †; Quintus Sertorius; Pontius Telesinus †; Marcus Lamponius

Strength
c. 30,000 men in 83 BC, massively increased by enemy desertions	Over 100,000 men

Sulla's civil war was fought between the Roman general Sulla and his opponents, the Cinna-Marius faction (usually called the Marians or the Cinnans after their former leaders Gaius Marius and Lucius Cornelius Cinna), in the years 83–82 BC. The war ended with a decisive battle just outside Rome itself. After the war the victorious Sulla made himself dictator of the Roman Republic.

== Prelude ==
Sulla had achieved temporary control of Rome and Marius's exile to Africa following his first march on Rome, but departed soon afterwards to lead the First Mithridatic War. This departure allowed Gaius Marius and his son Gaius Marius the Younger to return to Rome with an army and, with Lucius Cornelius Cinna, to wrestle control of Rome back from Sulla's supporter Gnaeus Octavius during Sulla's absence.

Based on the orders of Marius, some of his soldiers went through Rome killing the leading supporters of Sulla, including Octavius.

Their heads were exhibited in the Forum. After five days, Cinna ordered his more disciplined troops to kill Marius's rampaging soldiers. All told some 100 Roman nobles had been murdered. Marius declared Sulla's reforms and laws invalid, officially exiled Sulla, had himself elected to Sulla's eastern command, and Cinna and himself elected consuls for the year 86 BC. Marius died a fortnight after and Cinna was left in sole control of Rome.

Having managed this achievement, the Marians sent out Lucius Valerius Flaccus with an army to relieve Sulla of his command in the east. Flaccus had been given as second in command Gaius Flavius Fimbria, an individual who history records had few virtues. According to Plutarch's biography on Sulla, Gaius Flavius Fimbra eventually agitated against his commanding officer and incited the troops to murder Flaccus in 84 BC.

In the meantime, the two Roman armies camped next to each other, and Sulla, not for the first time, encouraged his soldiers to spread dissension among Flaccus’ army. Many deserted to Sulla before Flaccus had arranged to pack up and move on to north, to threaten Mithridates’ northern dominions. In the meantime Sulla moved to intercept the new Pontic army and end the war at Orchomenus.

== Course ==
With Mithridates defeated for the moment and Cinna now dead as a result of a mutiny in Ancona, Sulla was determined to regain control of Rome from his enemies.

=== Events of 83 BC ===
In the spring of 83 BC Sulla landed his army in two divisions in southern Italy: one division at Brundisium and another at Tarentum. At Tarentum Sulla made sacrifices to the gods. As soon as he had set foot in Italy, the outlawed nobles and old Sullan supporters who had survived the Marian-Cinna regime flocked to his banner. The most prominent among them were Quintus Caecilius Metellus Pius, Marcus Licinius Crassus, and Lucius Marcius Philippus. Metellus and Crassus did so at the head of their own independently-raised armies. Philippus, who was governing Sardinia, secured the island for the Sullan cause.

Gnaeus Pompeius Magnus (Pompey), son of Gnaeus Pompeius Strabo, raised three legions from among his father's veterans in his native Picenum and, defeating and outmanoeuvering the Marian forces, made his way to join Sulla. When Pompey met Sulla, he addressed him as Imperator. Publius Cornelius Cethegus, a firm supporter of Marius, now also joined the Sullan cause.

To check his enemies' unresisted advance, Gnaeus Papirius Carbo (consul 85 BC) sent his newly elected puppet consuls, Gaius Norbanus and Cornelius Scipio Asiaticus, both with armies, against Sulla. When Sulla arrived in Campania he found the consul Norbanus blocking the road to Capua. Eager not to appear a war-hungry invader, Sulla sent deputations to Norbanus offering to negotiate, but these were rejected. Norbanus then moved to block Sulla's advance at Canusium and became the first to engage him in the Battle of Mount Tifata. Here Sulla inflicted a crushing defeat on the Marians, with Norbanus losing six thousand of his men to Sulla's seventy. Norbanus withdrew with the remnants of his army to Capua. Sulla pursued him, but was stopped by Norbanus' consular colleague, Scipio Asiagenus, who was encamped at Capua.

Scipio was unwilling to risk a battle with his opponent's battle-hardened army and welcomed Sulla's offer to negotiate. Quintus Sertorius, one of Scipio's legates, did not trust Sulla, and advised Scipio to force a decisive action. Instead, he was sent to Norbanus to explain that an armistice was in force and negotiations were under way. Sertorius made a small detour and captured the town of Suessa, which had gone over to the Sullan faction. When Sulla complained about this breach of trust, Scipio sent back the hostages Sulla had given as a sign of good faith. This behaviour by Scipio outraged Scipio's troops, who were already upset having to face Sulla's veterans. A deal was made between Scipio's soldiers and Sulla and they defected en masse, further swelling his ranks. The Consul and his son were found cowering in their tents and brought to Sulla, who released them after extracting a promise that they would never again fight against him or rejoin Carbo. However, Scipio broke his promise immediately after their release and went straight to Carbo in Rome. Sulla then defeated Norbanus for a second time. Norbanus, however, escaped back to Rome and had Metellus Pius and all other senators marching with Sulla declared enemies of the state.

In Rome the elections for the consulship of 82 were held; Gaius Marius the Younger (the son of the great Gaius Marius) and Gnaeus Papirius Carbo (re-elected for the second time) were elected. At the end of the campaigning season of 83 BC, Marcus Lucullus, one of Sulla's legates, defeated a numerically superior force (50 cohorts to his 16) at Fidentia.

=== Events of 82 BC ===
The new consuls for the year 82 BC were Gnaeus Papirius Carbo, for his third term, and Gaius Marius the Younger, who was only 26–28 years old at the time.

In the respite from campaigning provided by winter, the Marians set about replenishing their forces. Quintus Sertorius levied men in Etruria, old veterans of Marius came out of retirement to fight under his son, and the Samnites gathered their warriors in support of Carbo, hoping to destroy Sulla, the man who defeated them in the Social War. Meanwhile, Sulla had sent Crassus to recruit troops from among the Marsi and Pompey to raise further legions in Picenum, also recruiting soldiers from Calabria and Apulia.

As the campaigning season opened, Sulla advanced along the Via Latina towards the capital and Metellus supported by Pompey led Sullan forces into northern Italy. Carbo threw himself against Metellus whilst the young Marius defended the city of Rome itself. Marius the Younger marched his army south-east into Campania and met Sulla's forces at Sacriportus (near Signia). After an initial engagement Sulla decided to pitch camp. While Sulla's men were preparing the camp (digging a ditch, throwing up earthworks) Marius suddenly attacked. Sulla's veterans simply stuck their pila into the ground to create a makeshift barricade and drew their swords. When they had organized their battle lines the Sullans counter-attacked. Marius' force were put on the defensive, their left began to waver and five cohorts of foot soldiers and two of horse deserted to Sulla. This caused a general collapse and Marius army scattered in rout. Marius lost 28,000 men (killed, captured, turned coat or fled) while Sulla is claimed to have only lost 23 men.

Marius survived the Battle of Sacriportus and retreated with 7,000 men to Praeneste. The first to arrive were lucky and could enter through the gates, but as the Sullan forces got closer the terrified townspeople of Praeneste shut the gates. Marius himself had to be hoisted in on a rope, while hundreds of Marians trapped between the walls and the Marians were massacred by Sullans. Sulla then left his lieutenant Lucretius Afella besieging Praeneste and moved on the now-undefended Rome. Upon his defeat Marius sent word to the praetor Lucius Junius Brutus Damasippus in Rome, to kill any remaining Sullan sympathisers left before Sulla could take the city. Damasippus called a meeting of the Senate and there, in the Curia itself, the marked men were cut down by assassins. Some, such as Lucius Domitius Ahenobarbus were killed on the senate steps as they tried to flee, and the Pontifex Maximus, chief priest of Rome, Quintus Mucius Scaevola was murdered in the Temple of Vesta; the bodies of the murdered were then thrown into the Tiber.

Meanwhile in the north, Metellus working in tandem with Pompey fought the consul Carbo and his legates Gaius Carrinas and Gaius Marcius Censorinus. Metellus defeated Carrinas at the River Aesis, only to be blockaded by Carbo himself. Upon hearing that Marius the Younger had been defeated at Sacriportus, Carbo withdrew to Ariminum, severely harassed by cavalry attacks on his rearguard by Pompey. Some time later Metellus and Pompey defeated Censorinus near Sena Gallica and sacked the town. Neapolis fell to the Sullans through treachery; virtually the whole population was massacred. Consequently, Appian remarks that the towns nearest to Rome surrendered without a fight. As Sulla surrounded Rome with his troops, the gates were opened by the people and he took Rome without a fight, the remaining Marians having fled.

Most of southern Italy now belonged to Sulla, though some cities, such as Praeneste, remained under siege. Sulla now set out for Etruria to the north. Sulla divided his army in two, sending one division to Saturnia by way of the Via Clodia while he commanded the other division to Clusium along the Via Cassia. Carbo decided to take on Sulla himself. Their two armies met near Clussium, where an indecisive all-day battle was fought. The next day Sulla retreated because he was informed that the Samnites and Lucanians were threatening Afella's army at Praeneste. The other Sullan force had meanwhile been completely successful, defeating its opponent near Saturnia. Lucius Marcius Philippus enjoyed another success on Sardinia, slowly winning the island for the Sullan cause. Marcus Lucullus, bottled up in Placentia, was able to break the siege. Norbanus coming to the rescue of the besiegers tried to surprise Lucullus by a forced-march, but Lucullus was ready for him and slaughtered his exhausted troops.

Having taken and looted the town of Sena, Crassus and Pompey severely defeated Carrinas who had marched against them, killing 3,000 Marian soldiers and forcing him to seek refuge in Spoletium. On his way to Praeneste, Sulla was able to ambush reinforcement on their way to Carrinas in Spoletium, killing 2,000 Marian soldiers. Carbo sent another army from Etruria to raise the siege of Praeneste. They were ambushed along the way by Pompey, who forced them back.

A Marian attack on Metellus near Faventia went horribly wrong for them. This caused the Lucanians in Norbanus' army to contemplate to defect to Sulla. Their commander, a man called Albinovanus, hatched a plan with the Sullans to assassinate Norbanus and his senior officers (to show his good faith). Albinovanus thus organized a feast, in which Norbanus' officers were murdered. Norbanus himself was unable to attend the feast and survived. After the assassination and the Lucanians' defection, Ariminum went over to Sulla as well. Norbanus abandoned his army and fled from Italy. Meanwhile, Sulla and his army had arrived at the siege of Praeneste, where he blocked an attempt by Damasippus to reach Marius the Younger. After Damasippus's failure, Carbo lost heart and fled to Sicily. With their leader gone, the remainder of the Marian forces united for one final stand.

The Samnite general Pontius Telesinus and the Lucanian general Marcus Lamponius, commanding a very large army of Samnites and Lucanians, were trying to get to Praeneste to break the Sullan siege. Unfortunately for them, Sulla and his army put themselves in their path in a very defensible position. Damasippus, Censorinus and Carrinas then joined their men with the Samnites and Lucanians and together they decided to march on Rome. When Sulla found out he immediately pursued them. Outside the walls of Rome, the last decisive battle of the civil war, the Battle of the Colline Gate, took place; Sulla, after a very hard-fought and drawn-out battle, emerged victorious. It was afterwards estimated that ca. 50,000 men lost their lives on the battlefield that day. Damasippus, Carrinas and Censorinus were brought to Sulla the following day and executed. Their heads and those of Lamponius and Telesinus were displayed to Marius at Praeneste.

Sulla subsequently entered Rome as a saviour (he had saved Rome from the Samnites, Rome's ancient enemy). A meeting of the Senate was convened in the Temple of Bellona; as Sulla was addressing the senators, the sound of terrified screams drifted in from the Campus Martius. Sulla calmed the senators by attributing the screams to 'some criminals that are receiving correction.' In reality, what the Senate had heard was the sound of 8,000 prisoners who had surrendered the previous day being executed on Sulla's orders; none of the captured were spared from execution. Soon after the Battle of the Colline Gate, Sulla had himself declared Dictator, and now held supreme power over the Republic. Marius tried to escape through the drains under Praeneste, but failed and committed suicide. The town surrendered; most of the defenders were executed, but Sulla spared the lives of its Roman citizens. Sulla and his lieutenants then campaigned all through Italy, mopping up the remaining resistance. The cities of Aesernia, Norba and Volterrae, all Marian strongholds were destroyed.

=== Aftermath 81 BC ===
The survivors of the Marian cause were given refuge on Sicily by Marcus Perperna, in Africa by Domitius Ahenobarbus and in Spain by Quintus Sertorius. Sulla sent Pompey to Sicily with a large force (six legions, 120 warships and 800 transport ships). According to Plutarch, Perpenna fled and left Sicily to Pompey. Carbo was soon discovered and arrested by Pompey, who "treated Carbo in his misfortunes with an unnatural insolence", taking Carbo in fetters to a tribunal he presided over, examining him closely "to the distress and vexation of the audience", and finally, sentencing him to death. Domitius Ahenobarbus held the Roman province of Africa (modern day Tunisia) for the Marians. While Pompey was still in Sicily, Sulla sent him orders to capture Africa as well. Pompey sailed to Utica (the province's Capital) and there he defeated Domitius. King Hiarbas of Numidia, who was an ally of Domitius, was captured and executed and Hiempsal II restored to the throne of Numidia. Sulla sent Gaius Annius Luscus with several legions to take the Spanish provinces from Quintus Sertorius. After a brief resistance Sertorius and his men were expelled from the Iberian peninsula. Unfortunately for the Sullans, Sertorius would be back the following year (see: Sertorian War).

== Result ==
As a result of this war, Sulla was installed as dictator of Rome, but many Italian towns and cities were heavily damaged: for instance, Sullan forces inflicted extensive damage upon Forlì (Forum Livii), which had allied with Marius. The reconstruction took decades.

In total control of Rome and Italy, Sulla instituted a series of proscriptions (a program of executing those whom he perceived as enemies of the state and confiscating their property).

Sulla immediately proscribed eighty persons without communicating with any magistrate. As this caused a general murmur, he let one day pass, and then proscribed two hundred and twenty more, and again on the third day as many. In an harangue to the people, he said, with reference to these measures, that he had proscribed all he could think of, and as to those who now escaped his memory, he would proscribe them at some future time.

The proscriptions are widely perceived as a response to similar killings which Marius and Cinna had implemented while they controlled the Republic during Sulla's absence. Proscribing or outlawing every one of those whom he perceived to have acted against the best interests of the Republic while he was in the East, Sulla ordered some 1,500 nobles (i.e., senators and equites) executed, although it is estimated that as many as 9,000 people were killed. The purge went on for several months. Helping or sheltering a proscribed person was punishable by death, while killing a proscribed person was rewarded. Family members of the proscribed were not excluded from punishment, and slaves were not excluded from rewards. As a result, "husbands were butchered in the arms of their wives, sons in the arms of their mothers". The majority of the proscribed had not been enemies of Sulla, but instead were killed for their property, which was confiscated and auctioned off. The proceeds from auctioned property more than made up for the cost of rewarding those who killed the proscribed, making Sulla even wealthier. Possibly to protect himself from future political retribution, Sulla had the sons and grandsons of the proscribed banned from running for political office, a restriction not removed for over 30 years.

The young Gaius Julius Caesar, as Cinna's son-in-law, became one of Sulla's targets and fled the city. He was saved through the efforts of his relatives, many of whom were Sulla's supporters, but Sulla noted in his memoirs that he regretted sparing Caesar's life, because of the young man's notorious ambition. The historian Suetonius records that when agreeing to spare Caesar, Sulla warned those who were pleading his case that he would become a danger to them in the future, saying: "In this Caesar there are many Mariuses."

Sulla, who opposed the Gracchian popularis reforms, was an optimate; though his coming to the side of the traditional Senate originally could be described as more reactionary when dealing with the Tribunate and legislative bodies, while more visionary when reforming the court system, governorships and membership of the Senate. As such, he sought to strengthen the aristocracy, and thus the Senate. Sulla retained his earlier reforms, which required senatorial approval before any bill could be submitted to the Plebeian Council (the principal popular assembly), and which had also restored the older, more aristocratic "Servian" organization to the Centuriate Assembly (assembly of soldiers). Sulla, himself a patrician and thus ineligible for election to the office of Plebeian Tribune, thoroughly disliked the office. As Sulla viewed the office, the Tribunate was especially dangerous and his intention was to not only deprive the Tribunate of power, but also of prestige. (Sulla himself had been officially deprived of his eastern command through the underhand activities of a tribune.) Over the previous three hundred years, the tribunes had directly challenged the patrician class and attempted to deprive it of power in favor of the plebeian class. Through Sulla's reforms to the Plebeian Council, tribunes lost the power to initiate legislation. Sulla then prohibited ex-tribunes from ever holding any other office, so ambitious individuals would no longer seek election to the Tribunate, since such an election would end their political career. Finally, Sulla revoked the power of the tribunes to veto acts of the Senate, although he left intact the tribunes' power to protect individual Roman citizens.

Sulla then increased the number of magistrates elected in any given year, and required that all newly elected quaestors gain automatic membership in the Senate. These two reforms were enacted primarily to allow Sulla to increase the size of the Senate from 300 to 600 senators. This also removed the need for the censor to draw up a list of senators, since there were always more than enough former magistrates to fill the senate. To further solidify the prestige and authority of the Senate, Sulla transferred the control of the courts from the equites, who had held control since the Gracchi reforms, to the senators. This, along with the increase in the number of courts, further added to the power that was already held by the senators. Sulla also codified, and thus established definitively, the cursus honorum, which required an individual to reach a certain age and level of experience before running for any particular office. Sulla also wanted to reduce the risk that a future general might attempt to seize power, as he himself had done. To this end he reaffirmed the requirement that any individual wait for ten years before being re-elected to any office. Sulla then established a system where all consuls and praetors served in Rome during their year in office, and then commanded a provincial army as a governor for the year after they left office.

Finally, in a demonstration of his absolute power, Sulla expanded the "Pomerium", the sacred boundary of Rome, unchanged since the time of the kings. Sulla's reforms both looked to the past (often re-passing former laws) and regulated for the future, particularly in his redefinition of majestas (treason) laws and in his reform of the Senate.

Near the end of 81 BC, Sulla, true to his traditionalist sentiments, resigned his dictatorship, disbanded his legions and re-established normal consular government. He stood for office (with Metellus Pius) and won election as consul for the following year, 80 BC. He dismissed his lictors and walked unguarded in the Forum, offering to give account of his actions to any citizen. In a manner that the historian Suetonius thought arrogant, Julius Caesar would later mock Sulla for resigning the dictatorship.
