= Picene (disambiguation) =

Picene may refer to:

- picene, a hydrocarbon
- Picene, a modern ethnonym for a resident of ancient Picenum in Italy, also found in the plural as Picentes or Picentini; thus:
  - either of two extinct languages speculated to have possibly been spoken by Picenes:
    - North Picene language
    - South Picene language

== See also ==
- Piceno (disambiguation)
