= Piceno =

Piceno is an Italian word usually related to Ascoli Piceno and its province. It may refer to:

== Languages ==
- North Picene language (It.: Piceno Settentrionale), an extinct language of ancient Italy.
- South Picene language (It.: Piceno Meridionale), an extinct language of ancient Italy.

== Places of Italy ==
- Picenum, a region of ancient Italy.
- Province of Ascoli Piceno, a province of the Marche.
- Ascoli Piceno, a town in the Marche region, seat of the homonymous province.
- Acquaviva Picena, a municipality of the Province of Ascoli Piceno, Marche.
- Belmonte Piceno, a municipality of the Province of Fermo, Marche.
- Camerata Picena, a municipality of the Province of Ancona, Marche.
- Loro Piceno, a municipality of the Province of Macerata, Marche.
- Potenza Picena, a municipality of the Province of Macerata, Marche.
- Porto Potenza Picena, a civil parish of Potenza Picena (MC), Marche.

== People ==
- Bruno Piceno (born 1991), Mexican footballer
- Picentes (It.: Piceni), an ancient Italian people

== See also ==
- Picene, a polycyclic aromatic hydrocarbon.
- Picene (disambiguation)
