= Novilara necropolis =

Archaeological site in Marche, Italy

- Location within Marche
- 43°51′52.6″N 12°56′03.2″E
- Type: necropolis
- Periods: 8th–7th-century BCE
- Cultures: Picentes
- Location: Province of Pesaro and Urbino, Marche, Italy

Site notes
- Excavation dates: July 1892–1893; March 2012–2013
- Archaeologists: Edoardo Brizio, Chiara Delpino
- Discovered: 1873

The Necropolis of Novilara is an archaeological site in the Province of Pesaro and Urbino, Italy. It is one of the most well-studied funerary sites of the ancient Picene culture.

== Excavation history ==
In 1860, a limestone stab depicting a naval scene was uncovered in San Nicola in Val Manente, near Novilara, though this discovery only became known to the broader archaeological community in 1871. In 1865, another slab—this one engraved with geometric and spiral designs—was uncovered in the courtyard of don Romolo Molaroni, the priest of Novilara. Spurred by these two finds, in 1873, Count Dario Bonamini attempted to excavate the site and, although he did uncover several graves, all documentation of the discoveries has been lost. In 1891, an archaeologist named Francesco Gamurrini heard reports that, 18 years prior, certain artifacts were discovered on the estate of Countess Servici at Novilara. Gamurrini conducted a one-day-long excavation in the area, which only yielded two new graves. Nevertheless, the results of his research were published in the Notizie degli Scavi in 1892, where they then attracted the attention of the archaeologist Edoardo Brizio, who recognized the tombs as typologically similar to other graves uncovered at Numana.

Brizio was appointed by the Italian government to conduct excavations in the area, which began in July 1892 and ended in 1893. Brizio subdivided the necropolis into two regions, which were dubbed the Servici and Molaroni areas according to the names of the original landowners. Brizio discovered at least 263 graves, 142 in the Molaroni area and 121 in the Servici, most of which dated to around the 8th or 7th-centuries BCE. During the 1892–1893 excavations, the archaeologist Raniero Mengarelli sought to classify the graves according to gender and age class. He determined gender based on the burial goods, and the age class based upon the size of the skeleton, which itself partially relied upon estimates of height obtained from measurements of the femur. Later in 1893, the anthropologist Giuseppe Sergi himself sought to identify the sex and age of the deceased, basing his analysis upon examination of the skulls and estimations of stature that employed the Manouvrier method, which was—at this time—the foremost technique for such studies. The majority of the artifacts discovered during the 1892–1893 excavation were stored in the Oliveriano Museum. However, the artifacts did not remain entirely safe: The museum suffered damages from an earthquake in 1916 and later it was looted during World War II. German soldiers stole 6 boxes containing grave goods from Novilara, though much of the material was eventually recovered.

Later research at the site began in 1912 at the behest of the archaeologist Innocenzo Dall’Osso, whose excavations resulted in the discovery of 33 tombs in the Servici area. Dall'Osso stored most of the findings in the archaeological museum of Ancona, all of which were lost after the Allied bombing of the city in 1944. In March 2012, as a consequence of a construction project to expand the A14 motorway, new excavations began in the Molaroni area under the auspices of the Soprintendenza Archeologica delle Marche. From 2012 to 2013, a team of archaeologists and anthropologists led by Chiara Delpino reexamined 36 previously discovered burials and uncovered 150 additional graves, which themselves also dated to the 8th-century BCE. The methods used in this excavation were negotiated with the Mundys corporation so as the avoid disrupting the construction efforts. Ultimately, the archaeologists sectioned the area into numerous portions each situated either perpendicular or parallel to the tunnel, thereby allowing for construction work to remain uninterrupted whilst permitting thorough archaeological research.

== Graves ==
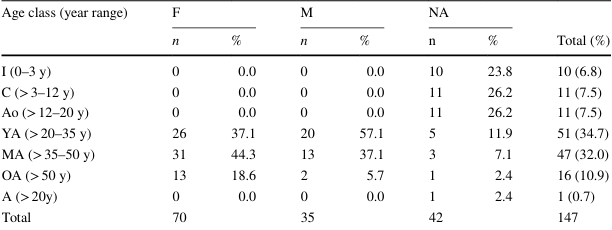
The age and sex distribution of 147 examined skeletons from Novilara: I). Infant; C). Child; Ao). Adolescent; YA). Young adult; MA). Middle old adult; OA). Old adult; A). Adult; F). Female; M). Male; NA). Not assessable

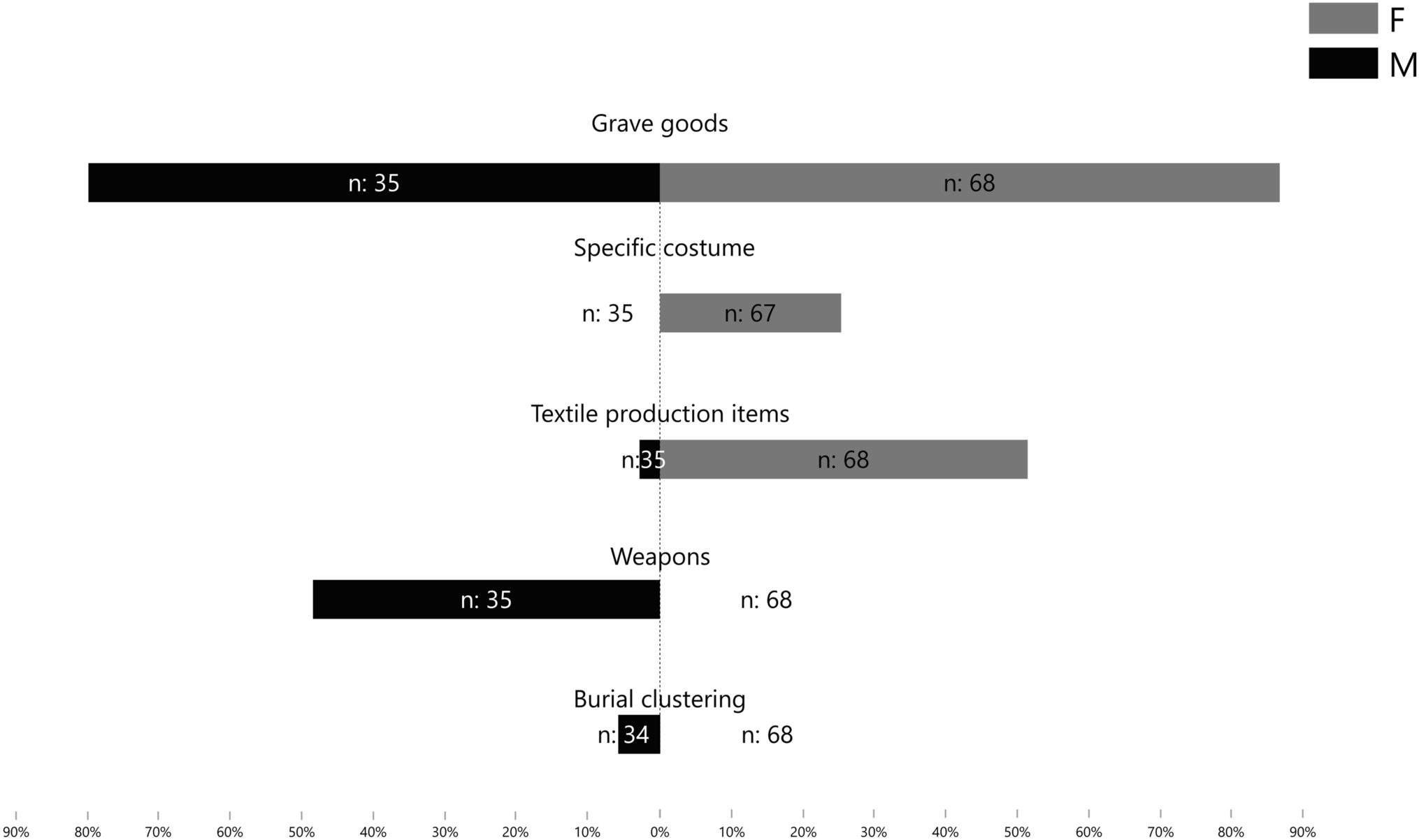
Grave good variability amongst a sample of tombs from the necropolis

=== Burial organization ===
With the exception of one cremation burial, all of the deceased were laid on their right side in fetal position within simple trenches, almost always with wooden planks both covering and running across the sides of the tomb. Given the highly compacted position of the deceased, it is likely that they were wrapped in a shroud tightened with laces. Typically, items connected to social status—including genderized goods—were positioned next to the corpse, while any personal adornments were often situated above the body, and vessels were most usually placed either between the feet or in the corner of the trench beside the head. In general, any garments were placed near the body parts they had adorned in life—necklaces were placed near the necks, rings near the fingers, bracelets on the arms, fibulae on the chest, and earrings beside the head. According to Delpino, the high degree of similarity across most of the burials implies the existence of shared cultural ideals dictating such behavior and potentially even authorities capable of enforcing such rules.

In about 5% of the burials unearthed during the 2012–2013 excavations, a layer of sea pebbles covered the bottom of the tomb. This type of interment is not restricted to Novilara and appears across Picenum, though—within Novilara—it is confined to exclusively the northeastern section of the cemetery. It is possible that this burial type was connected with some distinct cultural group or social status; they are usually accompanied by more luxurious grave goods than other burials. Another tomb from the Servici cemetery contains a layer of lime and pebbles placed at the bottom of the grave, thereby preventing direct contact between the ground and the deceased.

The tombs are not evenly distributed across the cemetery site; certain areas are more densely packed with burials than others, perhaps reflecting an intentional attempt to conglomerate burials in kinship clusters. Burials were not segregated by age—the graves of adults are situated in close proximity to child tombs, and—in two instances—a child and an adult were interred in the same burial. However, the vast majority of the graves included only one corpse, though—as noted—there are still several exceptions: Three tombs included two individuals who were buried simultaneously, two tombs showcased the reuse of an older burial site, and another grave contained two individuals who were interred at separate times.

In grave 171, two adults—one female and one probably male—were interred in the same tomb, though at separate times. The grave goods within this burial consisted of characteristically feminine brooches and other ornaments, though there was a set of masculine brooches lain across the woman's body, which were perhaps once wrapped in a textile such as a shroud. Given that the male was probably the first one to be interred within this tomb, it is possible that his burial goods were relocated onto the female when the tomb was reopened for her burial, presumably with her feminine grave goods then deposited at the site. Autosomal analysis of the entombed skeletons strongly suggests that they did not share any family relationship, although it is still possible that they may have held some social or legal connection. Similar autosomal analysis, this time performed upon a grave containing two female skeletons, also revealed that the occupants likewise lacked any familial link.

=== Genderized burials ===
==== Female burials ====
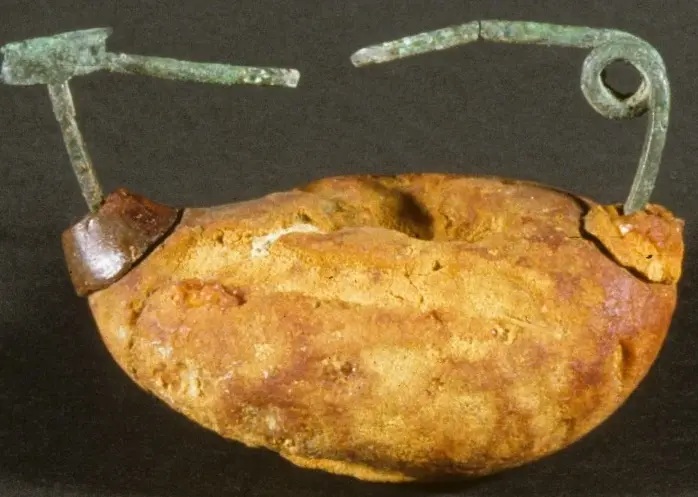
Fibula from the necropolis dating to the 7th-century BCE.

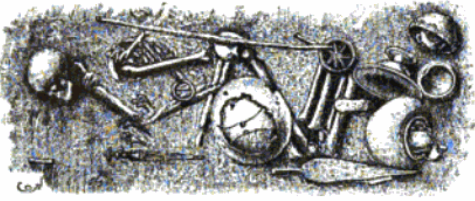
Male burial from the Servici cemetery. The skeleton is entombed with various weapons.

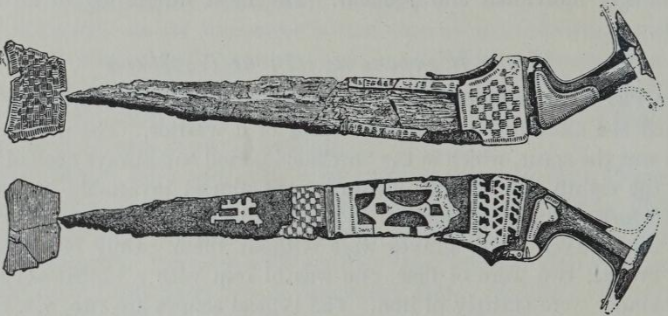
Iron sword from the Servici tomb 14. It has a wooden sheathe covered with bronze plates.

Amongst adult internments, female burials often included items related to weaving, such as textiles, spools, needles, loom weights, stitching awls, spindles, and spindle whorls. There is a positive, though not statistically significant, correlation between the age of females and the presence of textile items in their tombs. Female graves typically included a larger number of grave goods compared to male tombs, and these items were often more ostentatious burial goods than male graves. Female tombs could include personal ornaments such as fibulae, amber earrings, or pendants, and also elaborate garments embroidered with amber, glass, or bronze beads. In certain female graves, a type of large fibula with an amber bead was deposited near the top of the head of the deceased, which—according to Delpino—may indicate the presence of a headdress or a veil. Other decorations adorn a cloth outfit placed over the body between the arms and the pelvis, often with an accompanying piece fashioned of bronze rings placed at the bottom of the garment. Since the article of clothing usually lies in a flat position, Delpino argues that it is most probably not actually worn by the deceased.

Based on the funerary assemblage granted to women, it is likely that women in the local society were expected to perform primarily domestic tasks. These genderized items only begin to appear in female graves during adolescence. In one case, a girl aged between 12 and 15 years old was interred with a knife, an item that—according to Delpino—perhaps related to weaving, as small knives can be used as sewing tools. The allotment of these genderized items to girls around this age may imply that—by adolescence—they had assumed a more 'adult' role and were thus granted the more 'adult' funerary items. For girls, the particular choice in Picene culture to place this age threshold during adolescence was perhaps connected to puberty, and the concurrent onset of a girl's reproductive faculties.

==== Male burials ====
Male burials were far more likely to include either no funerary goods or only between 1 and 3 items, whereas female graves more likely to contain over 4 funerary objects. In terms of the goods themselves, male burials were usually associated with weapons, particularly arrowheads, axes, spear points, javelins, bronze and iron knives, and chariots. Spears were the most common type of weapon found at the site—out of a sample of 37 male burials in the Servici cemetery, only 4 lacked a spear. The spear-types at Novilara are further subdivided according to blade-style: Older spears often contained a long narrow blade, whereas more recent spears were characterized by a broader leaf-shaped blade. Based upon the remains of the wooden spear-shafts, which were sometimes preserved within the end of the blade, it can be determined that these two components were fastened together with a bronze wire, and—in at least one instance—a bronze ring.

Daggers also appeared in multiple varieties: Some had a curved blade, others a triangular blade, and another type had a straight blade that tapered into a sharp point. The daggers were themselves probably holstered in the leather belts uncovered at the site, which were fastened with bronze buckles. Axes were possibly used as tools in human warfare, though they may have more so served as hunting tools, given that—in grave 43—the axe appears in tandem with spits and a flesh-hook. At Novilara, there appears one example of a bird-axe, which was suspended from a drago-type fibula. This type of axe is distinguished by a flaring blade, a distal knob, a shaft or handle of varying length and width, a raised band around the neck of the tool, and a depiction of water-bird. Compared to other Italian bird-axes, the Novilaran examples displays a less-detailed depiction of a bird and a smaller and less-intricate blade. In terms of gender, bird-axes are associated with male burials at other Italian archaeological sites such as the necropolis of Casa Nocera, yet they are perhaps a feminine item in other regions such as the ager Faliscus.

One type of sword from Novilara consists of a broad iron blade that curves backwards by the hilt, to which it was fastened using nails. The sheathes were composed of wood, which was itself sometimes further decorated with bronze sheets, themselves occasionally bedecked with intricate designs engravings. Typologically, these swords are reminiscent of similar artifacts uncovered throughout cemeteries in Bosnia, perhaps implying that they were imported from the Balkans. Another sword, from tomb 101 in the Servici cemetery, is 38 centimetres (15 in) long and was fastened to a wooden hilt using nails. In tomb 44 at the Servici area, there appears an atypical type of 30.5-centimetre (12.0 in) long sword with a double-edged blade. Fragments of the handle and sheathe survive upon the blade, based on which it can be concluded that both objects were likely constructed of wood.

Shields were also probably an aspect of the Novilaran warrior's repertoire, with one grave containing a 25-by-30-centimetre (9.8 in × 11.8 in) bronze disc encircled by a grooved band pierced at consistent intervals with nails. This object perhaps formed the metal umbo of a larger wooden shield, which would have resembled the oval-shields carried by contemporary Greek soldiers. There were a select few male burials that included bronze helmets, which was possibly associated with some sort of leadership position. Certain helmets at the site consisted of several sheets of bronze hammered into shape, riveted together, and—on the inside—lined with leather and stuffed with soft materials. Two nails with rounded tops sat atop the helmet, perhaps for the purpose of supporting a plume. Other conical helmets were formed from a single sheet of metal with a ridge-shaped crest.

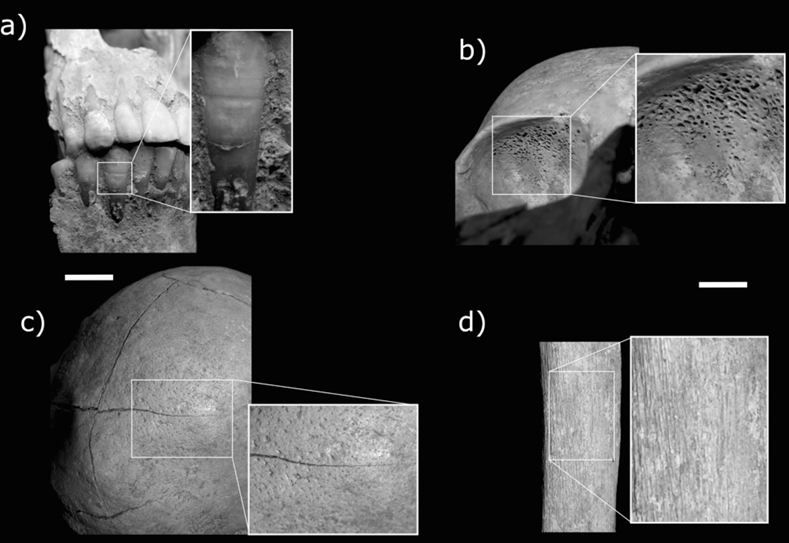
Skeletons from Novilara displaying the various paleopathological variables: a). linear enamel hypoplasia; b) cribra orbitalia; c). porotic hyperostosis; d). non-specific periosteal reaction.

==== Paleopathological differences ====
The significant differences between the burial goods assigned to male and female tombs implies the existence of strict gender roles. However, differences in the lifestyles of Novilaran men and women seemingly did not manifest themselves as any health differences visible in the osteological record. Examination of rates of cribra orbitalia (CO), linear enamel hypoplasia (LEH), non-specific periosteal lesions (NPL), and porotic hyperostosis (PH) amongst a sample of exclusively adult skeletons at Novilara revealed no association between the surveyed paleopathological variables and sex, which implies a similar exposure to environmental stressors for both adult men and women. The prevalence of LEH and CO throughout the sample was inversely correlated with the number of textile items and garments in the burials, implying that these individuals were less-exposed to environmental stressors, which itself is a sign of a higher-social status.

However, the aforementioned paleopathological data points do not provide a fully comprehensive review of all the potential factors influencing the health of an individual, and the absence of the particular medical conditions investigated in the study may merely result from a pre-mature death before the stressors could leave osteological traces. There is evidence of traumatic injuries and violent deaths on multiple skeletons from Novilara, which implies the existence of warriors in Novilaran society. One individual at the necropolis suffered a lesion on the left-side of their occipital lobe caused by a sharp object such as an arrow, dagger, or sword. In this case, the individual seemingly survived the wound and partially recovered, implying that they had received some medical treatment.

=== Infant burials ===
Infant and child burials were usually smaller than adult graves, typically covering an area around 90 by 50 centimetres (35 in × 20 in) large. Utilizing these metrics—the size of the grave and the lack of adult funerary items—the archaeologist Karl Beinhauer identified, amongst the skeletons uncovered during the 1892–1893 excavations in the Molaroni area, a total of 20 child tombs and 120 adult burials, which themselves consisted of 42 men, 78 women, and 13 unidentifiable bodies. Later analysis of the 150 burials discovered during the 2012–2013 excavations revealed that only 28 samples belonged to non-adults. Given the high prevalence of infant mortality in pre-industrial societies, it is likely that the number of sub-adult burials is disproportionate to the actual rates of non-adult death in the Picene community. It is possible, however, that there were funerary rites intended for sub-adult individuals, yet they left no trace in the archaeological record.

Graves belonging to non-adults typically included fewer burial goods, with burials belonging to stillbirths or infants younger than 18 months entirely lacking any mortuary items whatsoever. Beginning at the ages between 18 months and 2 years old, infants were interred ceramic vessels, two-handled cups, bowls, cothon-type vessels, and personal ornaments such as a brooch or a necklace made of bronze pendants or shells. There is little positive correlation between age and the quantity of burial goods for sub-adults—the number of artifacts does not increase with age and children were not entombed with more burial items than infants. The sudden bestowment of burial goods to infants perhaps signifies that, only upon reaching the age of 1–2 years old, they began to satisfy the requirements for inclusion within some sort of social clade, thereby entitling them to funerary rites. However, younger infants, who had not met this minimum threshold, were excluded from said societal group, thereby disqualifying them from receiving burial items. It is possible that this initial rite of passage was in some way connected with the transition from breastfeeding to weaning.

Adult burial goods were almost never deposited in child or infant tombs, though there is one exception—a burial belonging to a female infant aged between one and a half and 2 years old contains an engraved kothon, which are otherwise associated with adult women in funerary contexts. Uniquely, in this particular grave, the kothon was broken, perhaps for a ritual purpose. The grave goods most heavily related to gender in Picene society were also often absent from burials belonging to those who had not reached adolescence. However, infant burials sometimes contained both masculine and feminine items. For instance, one burial probably belonging to a female child aged between 3 and 5 years old included a specific type of fibula otherwise associated with male burials. Another tomb, this one belonging to an individual of undetermined sex, contained a dragon-type fibula, which was characteristically male, and two fibula whose style was generally connected with female burials. The lack of genderized objects in sub-adult burials perhaps indicates that children were exempted from the same gender ideals applied to adults, and that they perhaps only officially entered their gender roles upon reaching adolescence. Delpino suggests that these seemingly misgendered grave goods are perhaps reflective of some ceremonial deposition conducted by living family members.

Certain infant tombs contain unique goods otherwise absent from adult burials, such as small pottery vessels, a type of small bowl with two horizontal handles—which only appears in two tombs at the entire site—and small drinking cups, which were perhaps downsized so as to accommodate the small stature of children or representative of a variety of miniaturized ritual object. Infant tombs also sometimes contain imported artifacts belonging to earlier periods, such as infant of Tomb 124, which—though dated to the 7th-century BCE—was entombed with a two-handled drinking cup ornamented with metal strips, a type of vessel known from the later phases of Narce and the 8th-century BCE in Veii. Similarly, another infant tomb in Novilara, this one dated to the mid 7th-century BCE, contains a leech-shaped fibula with two stylized artworks possibly depicting birds, a type of artifact otherwise known from the last quarter of the 8th-century and the first quarter of the 7th-century BCE in Verucchio. According to Delpino, the provision of such artifacts to infants may reflect a desire to associate the burial with ancestors or to commemorate family ties.

== Archaeogenetics ==
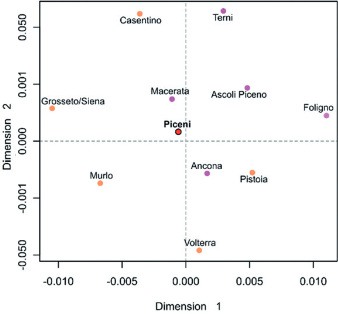
Chart showcasing the results of the MDS analysis examining the variability in mtDNA amongst a sample from Novilara

Genetic analysis of the burials at the necropolis revealed that they belonged to mitochondrial DNA (mtDNA) haplogroups typical of Western Eurasia such as H, H1, HV1, J1, and K. Moreover, the nucleotide diversity of the Novilaran sample—measuring at 0.0087 ± 0.005—was somewhat smaller than that of modern Italians, a result supported by additional resampling analysis. Based on a multidimensional scaling (MDS) analysis comparing the mtDNA of the first hypervariable region in the Novilaran population to samples of Italians who lived in 1833, it was determined that the former group displayed close genetic affinities with the 19th-century inhabitants of areas such Macerata, Ancona, Foligno, Terni, and Ascoli Piceno. The similarities between the different groups implies a level of genetic continuity between the ancient Novilaran populus and later occupants of the Marche region in Italy, itself indicating that later Roman, Celtic, and Gothic migrations had a limited impact upon the local gene pool. However, since the study exclusively surveyed mtDNA sequences, it can only support such continuity for the maternal lineages of the examined peoples, whereas other research on Y-chromosome DNA haplogroups in Italy has suggested greater variability amongst the paternal lineages. It is likely that these discrepancies result from differing histories of the male and female populations.

Further analysis, also employing MDS, compared the Novilaran population to samples from Bronze and Iron Age sites in Europe, seemingly revealing strong genetic affinities between the two groups. However, the authors argue that this result most likely results from a lack of adequate molecular data, and they suggest that further examination of the European samples utilizing technologies such as Next-generation sequencing may help identify later tampering with more modern DNA. Another study compared DNA samples drawn from tooth and petrous bone samples at both Novilara and the Sirolo-Numana necropolis, which is also a Picene site. No significant genetic differences between the two Picene necropoli were discovered, naturally implying genetic similarities between these communities. There are several outliers amongst the Novilara samples, one of which shows a closer genetic affinity with Near Eastern populations, and the other with Central European or Caucasian peoples. It is possible that these aberrant genetic sequences emerged as a consequence of trade contact between the Picenes and other regions of Europe and the Mediterranean.

== See also ==
- Novilara stele
