= 3rd CC.NN. Division "21 Aprile" =

Italian Blackshirt division during the Second Italo-Ethiopian War and World War II

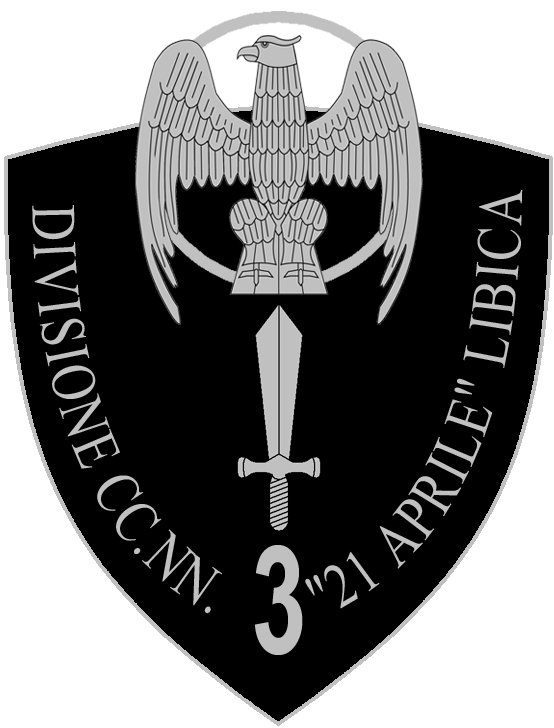
- 3rd CC.NN. Division "21 Aprile" insignia
- Active: 10 June 1935 - May 1940
- Country: Italy
- Branch: MVSN
- Type: Infantry
- Size: Division
- Motto: "Roma: nomen et omen"
- Engagements: Second Italo-Ethiopian War; World War II

Insignia
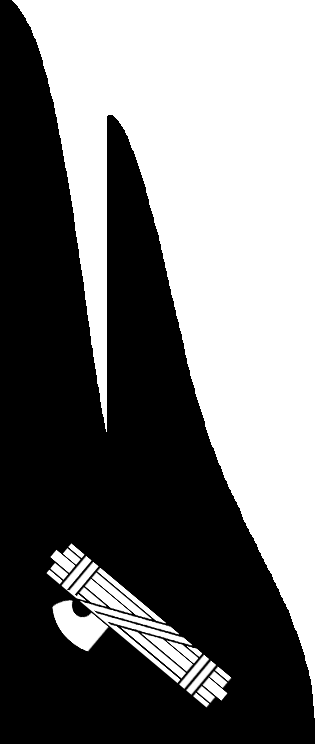
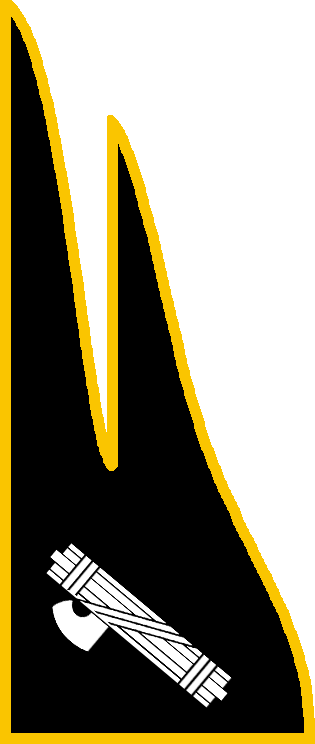
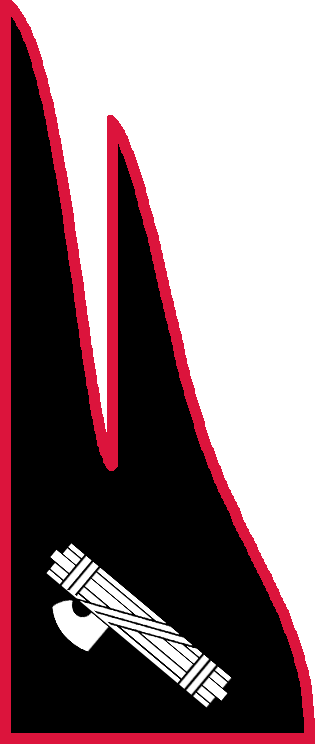
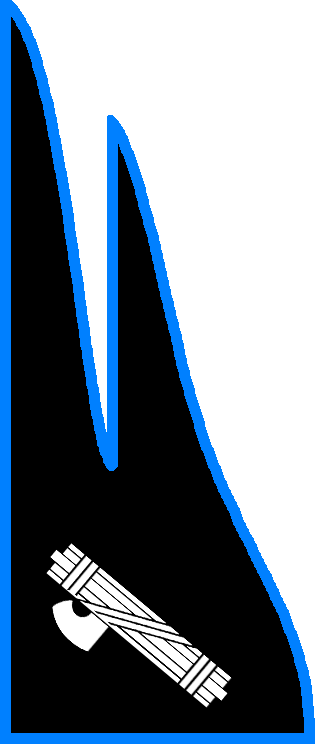
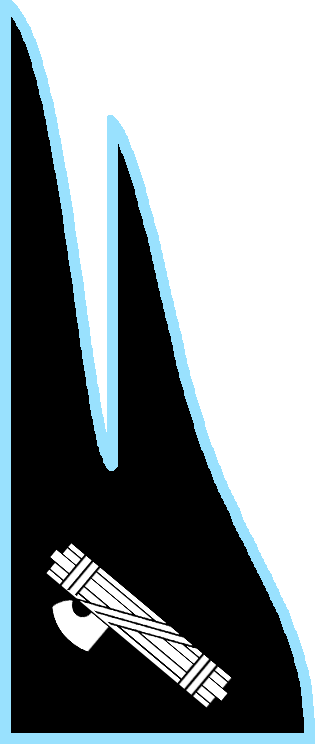
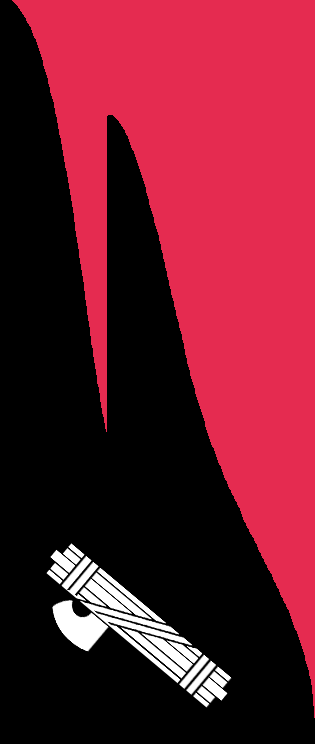
- Identification symbol: 3rd CC.NN. Division gorget patches

The 3rd CC.NN. Division "21 Aprile" (Italian: 3ª Divisione CC.NN. "21 Aprile") was an Italian CC.NN. (Blackshirts militia) division raised on 10 June 1935 for the Second Italo-Ethiopian War against Ethiopia and disbanded shortly before Italy's entry into World War II. The name "21 Aprile" was chosen to commemorate the legendary date of the founding of Rome.

== History ==
The division was one of six CC.NN. divisions raised in summer 1935 in preparation for the Second Italo-Ethiopian War. Its members were volunteers from the various armed militias of the National Fascist Party's paramilitary wing and came from five regions: the 230th CC.NN. Legion from Abruzzo, the 252nd CC.NN. Legion from Apulia and Basilicata, the 263rd CC.NN. Legion from Calabria and the III CC.NN. Machine Gun Battalion from the Marche.

=== Second Italo-Ethiopian War ===
The division arrived in Massawa in Italian Eritrea on 18-23 September 1935 and immediately began to train for the upcoming war. The division also build roads to facilitate the movement of the II Army Corps, which was earmarked to strike Adwa.

The division entered combat on 3 December 1935 at Gulà Gulè and then advanced towards Darò Miscellan-Amba Berach, reaching Addì Ghebetà on 12 and Axum on 15 December. The division covered the advance of the 19th Infantry Division "Gavinana" and on 20 December returned to Axum, where it build a defensive position. On 29 February 1936 the division took part in the Battle of Shire, covering the left flank of II Army Corps. On 2 March the division's 230th CC.NN. Legion "L'Aquila" defeated Ethiopian forces near Amba Adi Malech. The next day the continues its advance to Af Gaga and Cobò Nebrit. At the war's conclusion the division moved to the Tacazzè area, where it resumed the building of roads. The division was then repatriated and disbanded.

=== World War II ===
The division was reformed in 1939 and sent with three other CC.NN. divisions to Italian Libya. This time the members of the division came from four regions: the 181st CC.NN. Legion from the Emilia-Romagna and Umbria, and the 203rd CC.NN. Legion from Umbria, the Marche and Campania. The division was disbanded in May 1940 and its troops used to bring the other three CC.NN. divisions to full strength. The Royal Italian Army units were used to bring the forming 64th Infantry Division "Catanzaro" to full strength.

== Organization ==
=== Second Italo-Ethiopian War ===
Below follows the division's organization during the Second Italo-Ethiopian War and the cities, in which its CC.NN. battalions were raised; the legion's machine gun companies and artillery batteries were raised in the same cities as the legions.

- 3rd CC.NN. Division "21 Aprile"
  - 230th CC.NN. Legion "L'Aquila", in L'Aquila
    - Command Company
    - CCXXX CC.NN. Battalion, in L'Aquila
    - CCXXXVI CC.NN. Battalion, in Chieti
    - 230th CC.NN. Machine Gun Company
    - 230th CC.NN. Artillery Battery (65/17 mod. 13 mountain guns)
  - 252nd CC.NN. Legion "Acciaiata", in Lecce
    - Command Company
    - CCLII CC.NN. Battalion, in Lecce
    - CCLVI CC.NN. Battalion, in Potenza
    - 252nd CC.NN. Machine Gun Company
    - 252nd CC.NN. Artillery Battery (65/17 mod. 13 mountain guns)
  - 263rd CC.NN. Legion "Tommaso Gulli", in Reggio Calabria
    - Command Company
    - CCLXIII CC.NN. Battalion, in Reggio Calabria
    - CCLXIV CC.NN. Battalion, in Catanzaro
    - 263rd CC.NN. Machine Gun Company
    - 263rd CC.NN. Artillery Battery (65/17 mod. 13 mountain guns)
  - III CC.NN. Machine Gun Battalion, in Ascoli Piceno
  - III Artillery Group (65/17 mod. 13 mountain guns, Royal Italian Army)
  - III Mixed Transport Unit (Royal Italian Army)
  - III Supply Unit (Royal Italian Army)
  - 2x CC.NN. replacement battalions
  - 3rd Special Engineer Company (Mixed CC.NN. and Royal Italian Army)
  - 3rd Medical Section (Royal Italian Army)
  - 3rd Logistic Section (Royal Italian Army)
  - 3rd Carabinieri Section

The supply unit had 1,600 mules and the mixed transport unit 80 light trucks. The division engaged in war crimes in Ethiopia during the Second Italo-Ethiopian War.

=== World War II ===
3rd CC.NN. Division "21 Aprile" organization

Below follows the division's organization during its time in Italian Libya and the cities, in which its CC.NN. battalions were raised.

- 3rd CC.NN. Division "21 Aprile"
  - Headquarters
    - Command Company
    - 705th Carabinieri Section
    - 706th Carabinieri Section
    - 303rd Field Post Office
  - 181st CC.NN. Legion, in Ravenna
    - Command Company
    - LXXI CC.NN. Battalion "Manfredi", in Faenza
    - LXXXI CC.NN. Battalion "A. da Barbiano", in Ravenna
    - CII CC.NN. Battalion "Cacciatori del Tevere", in Perugia
    - 18st CC.NN. Machine Gun Company
  - 203rd CC.NN. Legion, in Foligno
    - Command Company
    - CIII CC.NN. Battalion "Clitunno", in Foligno
    - CX CC.NN. Battalion "Piceno", in Ascoli Piceno
    - CXLIII CC.NN. Battalion "C. Ricci", in Benevento
    - 203rd CC.NN. Machine Gun Company
  - 203rd Artillery Regiment "21 Aprile" (formed by depot of the 7th Army Corps Artillery Regiment in Livorno)
    - Command Unit
    - I Group (75/27 mod. 06 field guns)
    - II Group (75/27 mod. 06 field guns)
    - III Group (100/17 mod. 14 howitzers)
    - 3rd Anti-aircraft Battery (20/65 mod. 35 anti-aircraft guns)
    - 203rd Anti-aircraft Battery (20/65 mod. 35 anti-aircraft guns)
    - 181st Support Weapons Battery (65/17 mod. 13 mountain guns)
    - 203rd Support Weapons Battery (65/17 mod. 13 mountain guns)
    - Ammunition and Supply Unit
  - CCIII Machine Gun Battalion (Royal Italian Army)
  - CCIII Mixed Engineer Battalion (Royal Italian Army)
    - Command Platoon
    - 1 × Engineer Company
    - 1 × Telegraph and Radio Operators Company
    - 1 × Searchlight Section
  - 203rd CC.NN. Anti-tank Company (47/32 mod. 35 anti-tank guns)
  - 203rd CC.NN. Support Weapons Battery (65/17 mod. 13 mountain guns)
  - 203rd CC.NN. Mortar Company (81mm mod. 35 mortars)
  - 203rd Medical Section (Royal Italian Army)
    - 3 × Field hospitals
    - 1 × Surgical Unit
  - 203rd Supply Section (Royal Italian Army)
  - 203rd Transport Section (Royal Italian Army)

== Commanding officers ==
During the Second Italo-Ethiopian War:

- Generale di Divisione Giacomo Appiotti (10 June 1936 - November 1936)

== Sources ==
- Ettore Lucas and Giorgio de Vecchi, "Storia delle Unità Combattenti della MVSN 1923-1943", Giovanni Volpe Editore, 1976. pages 63 to 116 plus errata
- George F. Nafziger - Italian Order of Battle: An organizational history of the Italian Army in World War II (3 vol)
