= Giacomo Appiotti =

Italian general (1873–1948)

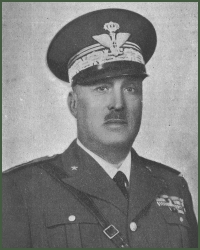
Giacomo Appiotti in 1937

Giacomo Appiotti (1873–1948) was a lieutenant general of the Italian Army during the Second Italo-Abyssinian War.

Appiotti was born in Turin on 3 February 1873.

He was the commanding officer of the 12th Brigade from 1929 to 1933. In 1935, he was the general commanding the 3rd Black Shirt Division XXI Aprile in Ethiopia during the Second Italo-Abyssinian War. He was a member of the Commission of Affairs of Italian Africa, of the Italian Senate from 1939 to 1943 during the Second World War. In 1943, he was president of the Administration Council of the Military Union.

He died in Rome on 29 January 1948.
