= Picentes =

Population of Picenum, on the northern Adriatic coastal plain of ancient Italy

Approximate distribution of languages in Iron Age Italy during the sixth century BC, before the Roman expansion and conquest of Italy

The Picentes or Piceni or Picentini were an ancient Italic people who lived from the 9th to the 3rd century BC in the area between the Foglia and Aterno rivers, bordered to the west by the Apennines and to the east by the Adriatic coast. Their territory, known as Picenum, therefore included all of today's Marche and the northern part of Abruzzo. Recently, a genome-wide archaeogenetic study of individuals from two Picene necropoleis found that all the individuals associated with this culture display genetic continuity with earlier populations.

The limits of Picenum depend on the era; during the early classical antiquity the region between the Apennines and the Adriatic Sea south of Ancona was Picenum (South Picenians), while between Ancona and Rimini to the north the population was multi-ethnic (North Picenians) because after 390 BC the Senoni Gauls had combined with or supplanted earlier populations. In the Roman Republic the coastal part of northern Picenum was called the ager Gallicus.

== History ==
Peoples of northern Italy in the 4th to 3rd centuries BC

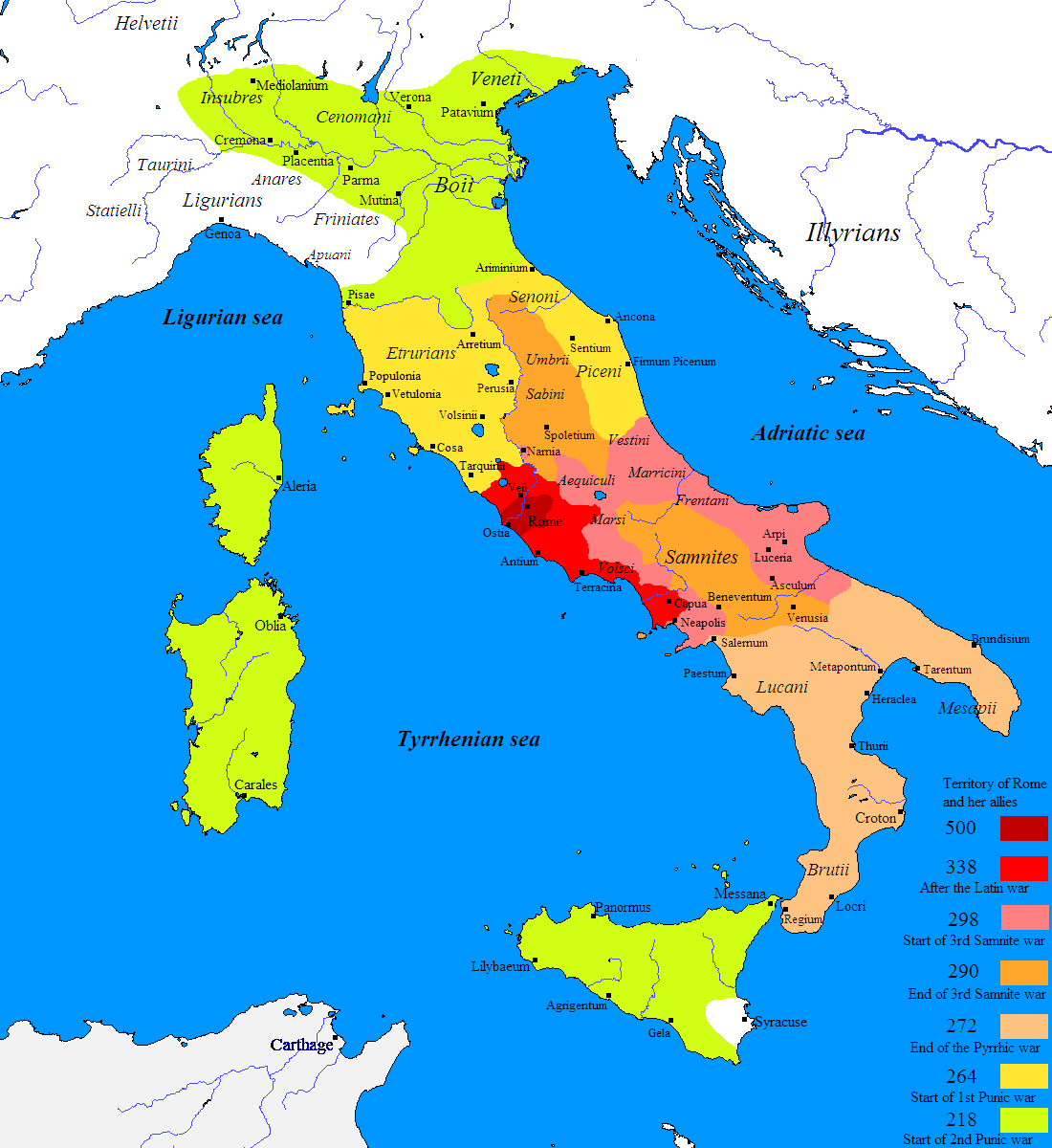
Roman expansion in Italy from 500 BC to 218 BC through the Latin War (light red), Samnite Wars (pink/orange), Pyrrhic War (beige), and First and Second Punic War (yellow and green). Cisalpine Gaul (238-146 BC) and Alpine valleys (16-7 BC) were later added. The Roman Republic in 500 BC is marked with dark red.

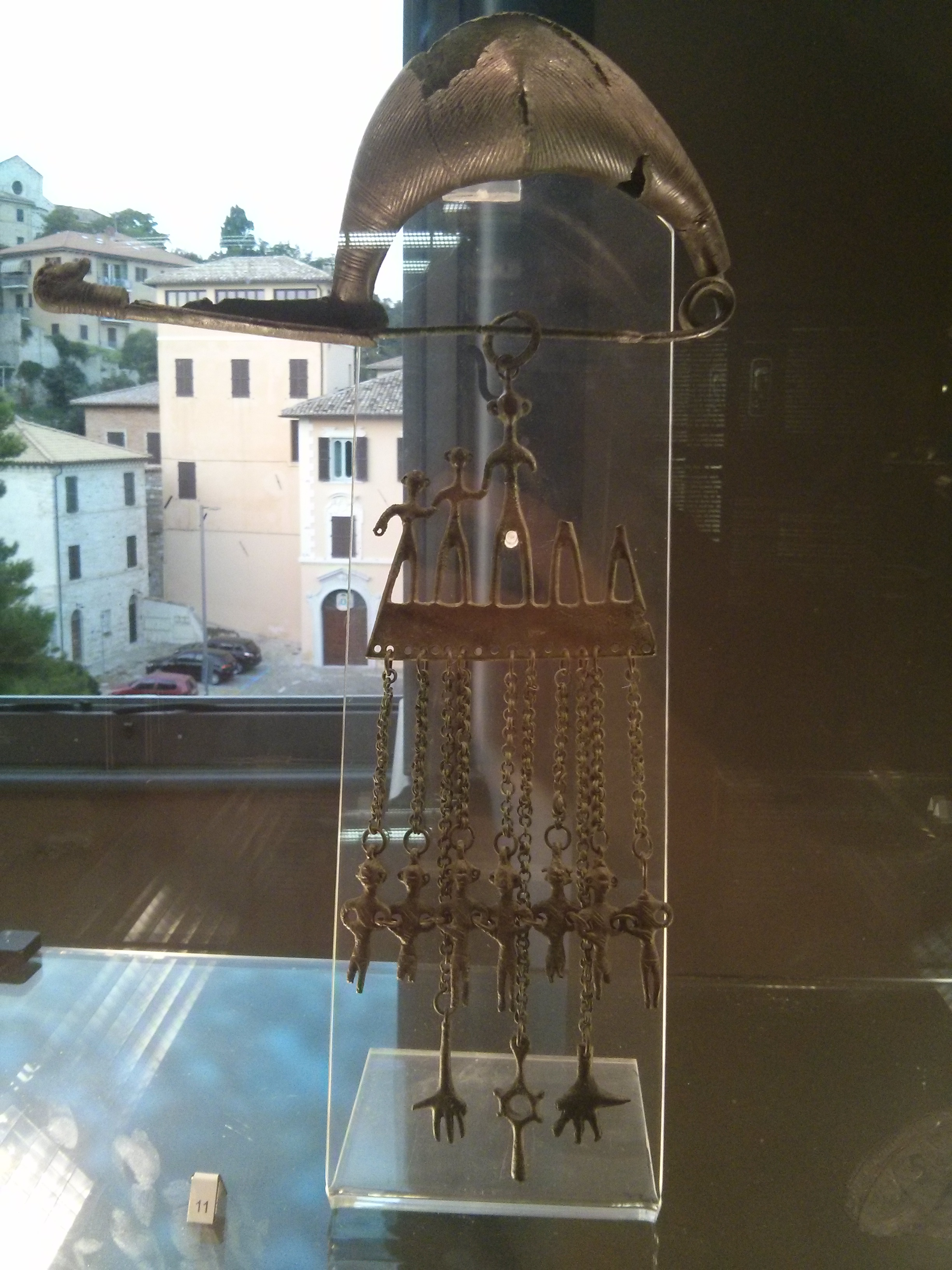
Bronze fibula and "pettorale" at Museo Archeologico Nazionale delle Marche, Ancona.

Picentes may have been Sabine colonists, although this is doubted by more recent scholars, who see the South Picenes more closely related to the Sabellians, as Steppe ancestry and Bell Beaker culture materials have been found in central Italy since c. 1600 BC. Picentini date from the 9th c. BC as shown by archaeology.

The Piceni did not have a state-type organisation, had no predominant inhabited centre, and therefore had no need for a capital. In 390 BC, the Senoni Gauls invaded Italy from the north and occupied Picenum north of the Esino river, and the centuries-old balance in Picenum underwent drastic changes. The archaeological evidence shows groups of Senones settled much further south of this river, in the Macerata area and even in the Ascoli area, in sites such as Filottrano, San Genesio, Matelica, and Offida.

=== Pre-Roman Picenum ===
The long period of development of the Picenum civilisation has led to several periods (Picenum I to VI) being used to subdivide the period from the 9th to the 3rd century. BC.

The objects left by the Piceni are strongly characteristic: in sculpture, in figurative art (which shows an imagination in figures and a tendency towards abstraction), in the forms of ceramics, in the abundant use of amber, in the variety of weapons, and in female adornments.

==== Phase "Picenum I" (9th century BC) ====
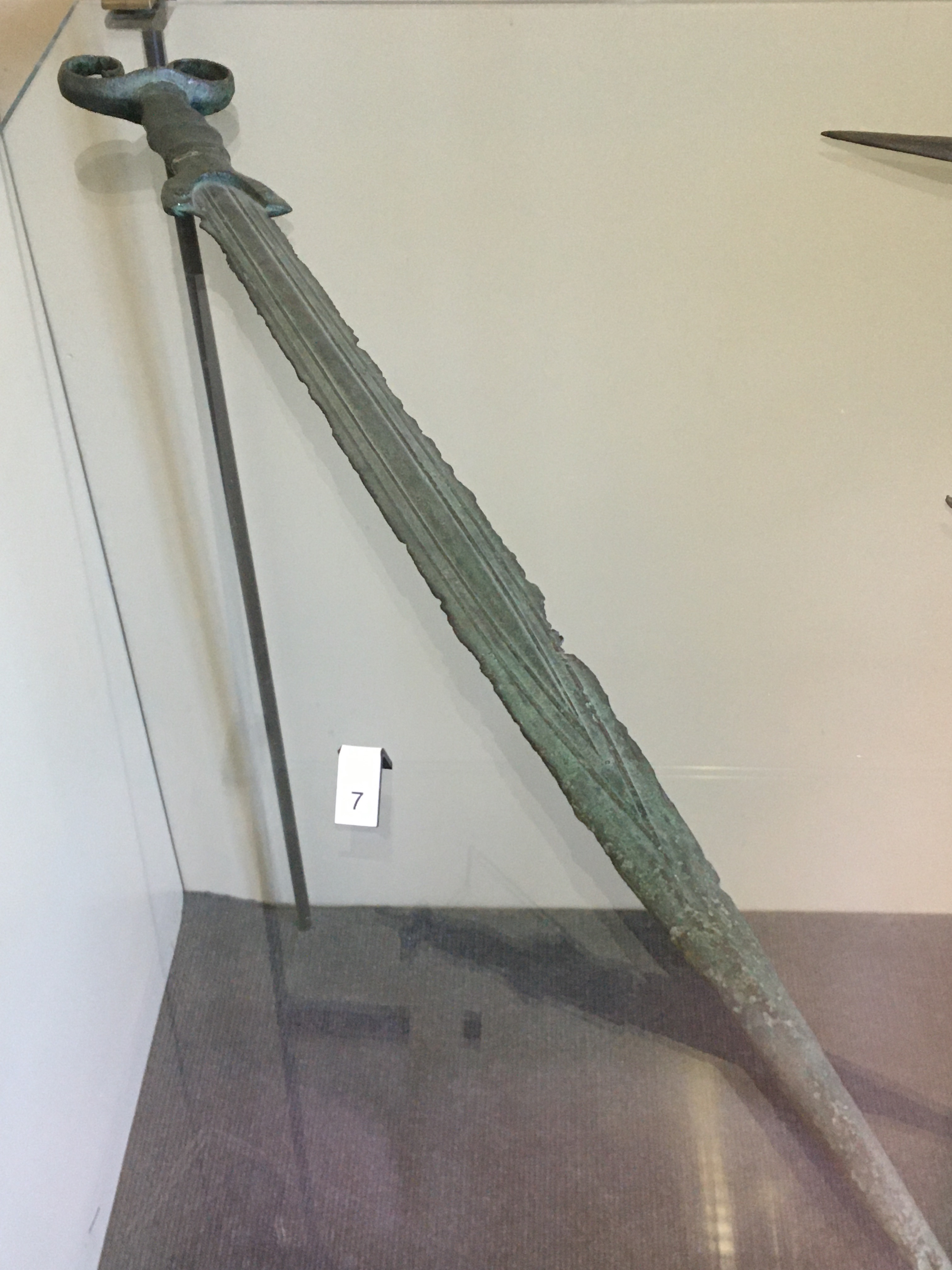
Picene bronze sword 9th c. BC

The birth and spread of the Picene civilisation mark the transition from the Bronze Age to the Iron Age in the Marche region. In the first phase, the Piceni necropolises and settlements show a gradual passage between these two ages, given the close archaeological links with the previous Bronze Age civilisations widespread in the Marche: the Apennine culture and the Proto-Villanovan culture. From the point of view of funeral customs, the Picenes are distinguished from previous civilisations by the use of the burial ritual (curled up and on a bed of gravel), but among the elements of continuity with the cultures of the Bronze Age, there is the continuation, although in small numbers only, of incineration tombs.

The archaeological evidence of this first phase shows a concentration of the population in the coastal area and in particular in the area of the Conero promontory (Ancona, Numana, Camerano, Osimo) and the short stretch of high coast of Porto Sant'Elpidio; inside, the settlements of Monte Roberto and Moie di Pollenza are known. The guiding exhibit is the kothon, a small, typically Picene terracotta vase, with a flattened globular shape, a narrow mouth, and a single handle.

==== Phase "Picenum II" (8th century BC) ====
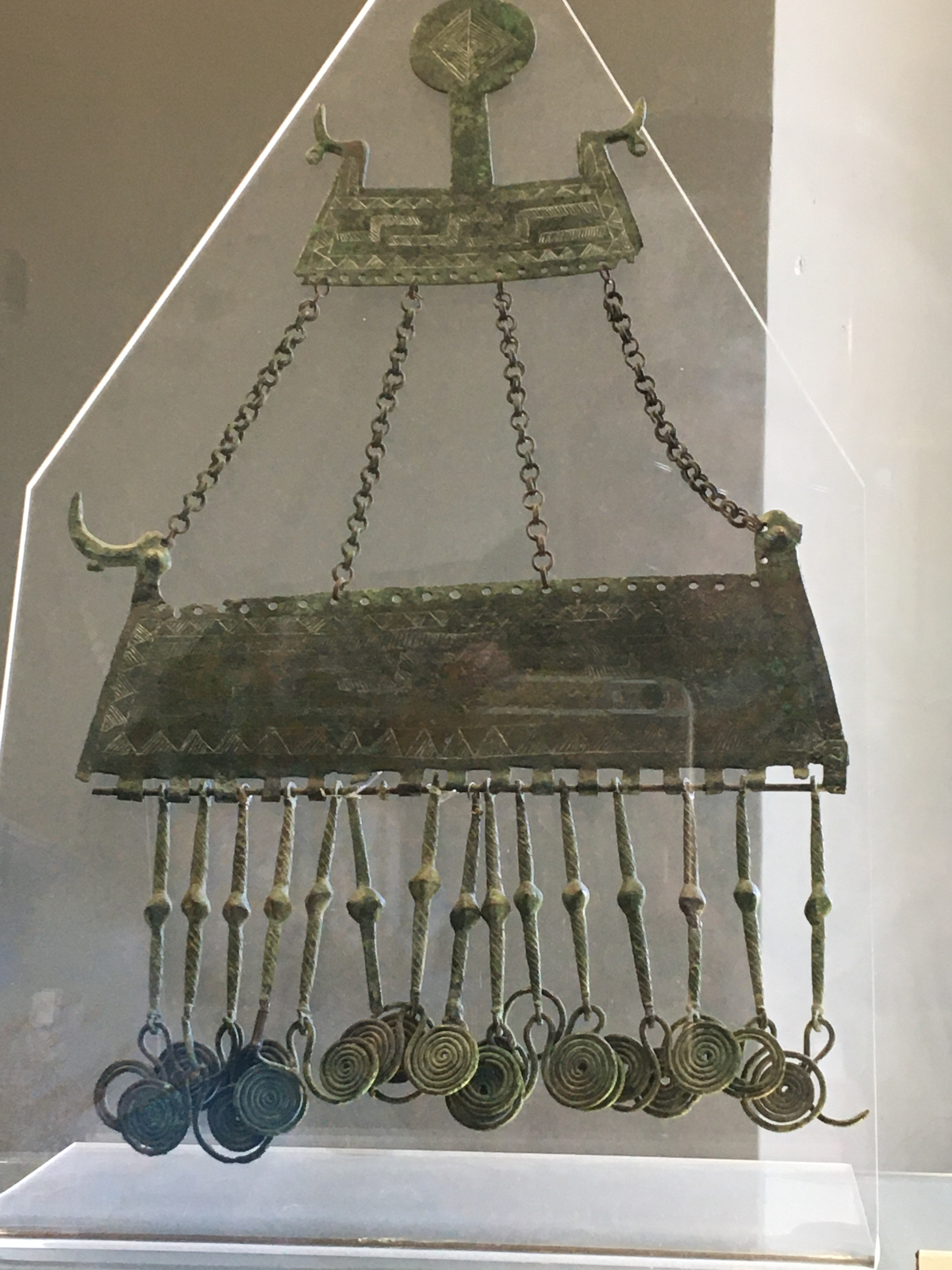
Piceni breastplate with the mythical solar boat (National Archaeological Museum of the Marche in Ancona) 8th c. BC

The archaeological evidence bears witness to a diffusion of the Picene civilisation towards the north, up to the northern part of the Marche, where the very rich necropolis of Novilara was found, up to now the only one fully excavated and which has been able to enjoy a complete publication of the results of the excavation. The phase is characterised by a great development of metallurgy, also testified by typical Picene objects, such as the spiral armlets in laminate and the solar boat pectorals with wild duck protomes on the bow and stern, rich in symbolic meanings. In this phase, among other things, the first iron objects appear: short swords and cutlasses. Despite this, bronze swords of the "antenna" type are still produced and used. Some metal objects bear witness to relations with the opposite Adriatic shore; among these, the fibulae with spectacles, subsequently accompanied by a vast range of typologies of fibulae of all sizes, which appear as a characterising element of Picene female ornaments.

==== Phase "Picenum III" (7th century BC and part of the 6th, up to 580 BC) ====
The diffusion area of the phase coincides with that of the previous phase: all the Marche; however, a concentration of testimonies can be observed in the area close to the Apennines, characterised by an orientalising culture, that is influenced by the Mediterranean East: Egypt, Syria, Asia Minor. In fact, objects from these countries were imported into Picenum through the Greek emporiums of Ankón (Ancona) and Numana. Also characteristic of this phase are the imports of Etruscan objects made in a style similar to the oriental one. Even the Etruscan civilisation, in fact, goes through a similar phase, also called "orientalising". Tumulus tombs and circle burials are typical of this phase, typologies that are influenced by oriental customs; in these tombs, the deceased are often accompanied by their war chariot. The best-known centres of the orientalising Picenum area are located near the Apennine passes and are therefore linked to trade with the Etruscans: Fabriano, Pitino di San Severino, and Taverne di Serravalle. The best known finds are the oinochoe made using an ostrich egg, the lid with the dance around the totem, and the war chariots. In the Picenum, the orientalising period begins around the middle of the 7th century.

Despite the external influences, local art is still flourishing and is characterised by the tendency to synthesise human and animal figures to the point of making them almost abstract; typical examples are the armour-discs decorated with human figures juxtaposed with fantastic animals. Furthermore, in this phase, the production of extraordinary ceramics for variety and formal imagination begins. Metallurgy also produces objects of great originality, such as breastplates decorated with human figures linked together by rings or by holding hands; the best known example is the one from Numana. The fibulae are also produced in the most varied typologies, such as those with a winding bow, a dragon with antennas, a ship; another very typical item of women's clothing is the "disc-stole", made with solar symbols.

The Novilara inscriptions and the absorption of the Villanovan culture of Fermo within the Picene culture date back to this period.

==== Phase "Picenum IV" (from 580 to 470 BC) ====
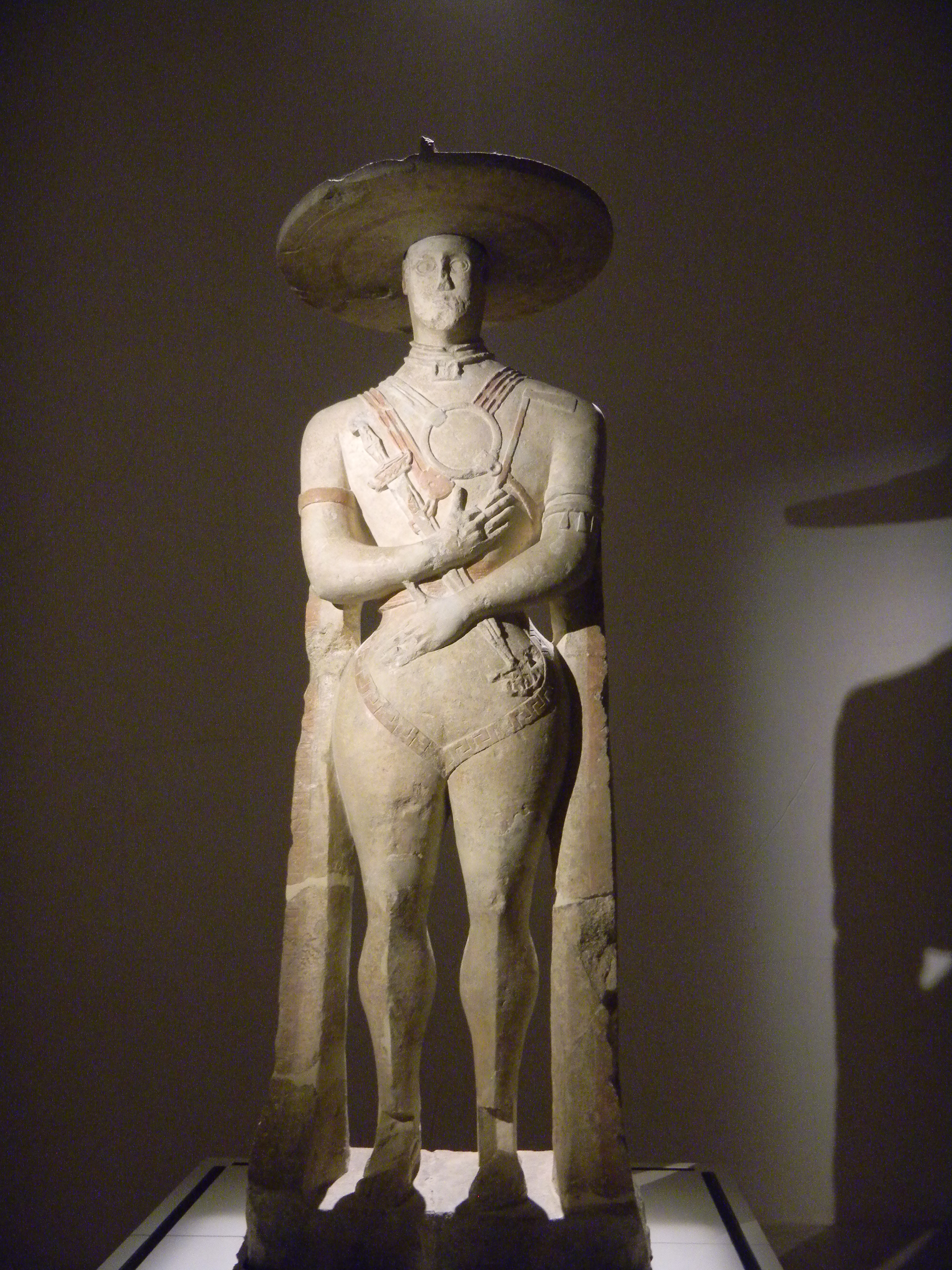
Statue of the Capestrano Warrior at Chieti Museum.

The phase is divided by archaeologists into "Picenum IV A" and "Picenum IV B", which are considered here together.

The territory saw a rarefaction of the testimonies to the north of the Esino and a flowering of testimonies in the south of the Marche and in the north of Abruzzo.

Some of the most typical and well-known elements of the Picene civilisation date to this period. In particular, they are: the South Picene inscriptions, the monumental statuary of Numana and Capestrano, the extraordinary richness and variety of the female ornamentation of the fibulae, even more than in the previous phase, and the enigmatic six-knot rings, which appeared in the early twentieth century as a symbol of the entire Picene civilisation.

The typical material of this period can be considered amber, already attested previously, but with which the best-known objects, coming from Belmonte Picenum, were made in this phase. An amber route has been identified that from the Baltic reached the coasts of Picenum, where the fossil resin was much appreciated, also due to the characteristics that put it in relation with the solar symbology. In the last century, the Piceni were also called "people of amber" because of their love for this material, and their very name was related to the Latin term pix, picis, i.e., amber.

Weapons are now all made of iron, and present a great variety and continuous updating, a rare thing in Italic peoples of the same period; among the offensive weapons of the period we remember the scimitar, broadsword of the machaira type and, among those of defense, the typical helmets with reliefs in the shape of animal horns, which however coexist with other helmets of the Greek-Corinthian type. The production of armor-discs continues, but they, too, are strongly influenced by Greek art in their ornamentation. The inhumation is now fully extended.

==== Phase "Picenum V" (from 470 BC until the beginning of the 4th century) ====
From a territorial point of view, we note a revitalisation of the Picenum centres north of the Esino; south of this river, all the centres already vital in the previous phase continue their activities.

The dominant archaeological feature of this phase is the massive importation of Greek red-figure pottery, which then spread throughout the Picenum territory through the ports of Numana and Ancona. In particular, the complex of vases from Numana is exceptionally rich, with specimens also monumental and with rich mythological representations.

This abundance can be explained by thinking of the fact that, after the naval battle of Alalia (540 BC), the Etruscans and the Carthaginians managed to prevent the Greeks from trading freely in the Tyrrhenian Sea. Thus, the Adriatic cities of Numana, Spina, and Adria flourished, which in any case allowed a commercial outlet for the rich Greek vase production. Interestingly, a form of Attic pottery was produced by the Greeks specifically for the Piceni; it is the "plate with a high foot", which some archaeologists think was used to serve a typical Picenum product during banquets: olives.

==== Phase "Picenum VI" (4th and a small part of the 3rd century BC, up to the Battle of Sentinum) ====
The Battle of Sentinum conventionally marks, according to archaeology, the dissolution of the Picene culture, which from then was gradually absorbed within the Roman one. Naturally, even after this date, the history of the Piceni continues, even if its vitality is no longer expressed so much on a cultural (and therefore archaeological) level, as in the important role they played during the Romanisation of the Adriatic coast. This explains the fact that, despite the Picenum phase VI is the last described by the archaeologists, the history of the Picenes continues even after this phase, and is the subject of the following paragraphs.

A fundamental event of the period is the arrival of the Senoni Gauls, who occupied the northern part of the Picenum territory, reaching as far as the Esino river, with temporary or limited expansions even further south. The Senones partially merged with the Piceni of the occupied areas, but profoundly influencing their culture. After the Gallic invasion, the control by the Piceni of the Adriatic coastal area is approximately included between the Castellano torrent, Numana, and the Conero. The Picenum territory occupied by the Gauls was later called by the Romans Ager Gallicus or specifically the Ager Gallicus Picenus.

Another event that contributed to modifying the ethnic balance of the Picenum territory was the arrival of Greeks, coming from Syracuse, who founded the colony of Ankón (Ancona), which absorbed the previous Picenum village.

Despite these factors, the Picene culture, precisely in this period, produced a highly original type of vase, defined by archaeologists as "upper Adriatic ceramics", characterized by female figures seen in profile, so stylized as to recall some forms of modern art.

=== Roman Era ===
When in 299 BC the Romans captured Nequinum, they also concluded a treaty with the Picentes. In 297 BC the Picentes warned the Roman Senate that they had been approached by the Samnites asking for alliance in renewed hostilities with Rome for which the Senate thanked them.

==== Picentine war ====
The Romans in about 290 BC had absorbed the territory of the Pretuzi, south of Picenum and after a series of victories with the help of the Piceni themselves, the Senones were expelled from the coastal region in 283 BC and the Romans annexed it down to Ancona when it became part of the Ager publicus (Roman state land). The Romans had made Senigallia a colony and were planning another colony a little further north. Following this progressive and unstoppable expansion of Rome around their territory, the Piceni realised that they had supported a great power by which they were surrounded, and hence they broke the alliance and in 269 BC revolted and started the "Picentine war".

The consuls Appius Claudius Russus and Publius Sempronius Sophus were sent by the Roman Senate to Picenum. Sempronius arrived through the Tronto valley, while Appius passed through Umbria, descended into the Potenza valley through the Pioraco straits, and took the fortified city of Camerino. To reunite the armies, the consuls conducted the military campaign by first invading the territories of the Agro Palmense (Fermo), so as to wedge themselves between the northern and southern Piceno territories. Sempronius led his troops into the Aso valley, avoiding a frontal attack on the city of Ascoli Piceno, which would have greatly delayed the campaign. After defeating the Picene troops at Interamnia, he arrived in what is now Ortezzano; following a new clash with the Picene resistance, the same city was devastated. Meanwhile, the Piceni forces had gathered at Truento, with a strong army; thus, Sempronius had to go back, in the valley of the Tronto, slowing down the advance. Before the battle started, a massive earthquake shook the earth, throwing men on both sides into panic; the first to awake from fear were the Romans, since the consul stated that the seismic event was a favourable omen for Rome and that, after the battle, he would erect a temple in Tellure. Once the initial fear was overcome, calm returned even among the ranks of the Piceni. The ensuing clash was so violent that few survived the battle on either side. The negative outcome of the battle reduced the Piceni to sue for peace. For Rome, the victory against the Piceni was so important that, in addition to being given a triumph to the consuls, the Senate decided to mint memorial silver coins for the first time.

Ancona retained the statute of civitas foederata or ally of Rome and Asculum received the same status but the rest of Picenum was annexed and partially Romanised, their cities being made first civitas sine suffragio (268 BC) and then civitas optimo iure (241 BC). The Romans made two more colonies to hold it: Ariminum in 268 and Firmum in 264. Between these years part of the Piceno population was deported: the inhabitants of Ortona to Lake Fucino, some colonies founded in Marsica, Campania, giving them land at Paestum and on the river Silarus and assisted them to build a city, Picentia. They also placed a garrison at Salernum to monitor them. Strabo reports that in his time (64 BC – c. 24 AD) they had depopulated the city in favour of villages scattered about the Salerno region. In Ptolemy's time (2nd century AD) a population named by him the Picentini were still at Salernum and Surentum.

==== Social War ====
Following the expansion of the Roman Republic in the 2nd century BC, to which the Italians had contributed, they asked that Roman citizenship be extended to them, but they continued to be legally discriminated against. It came to a head when the Social War (91–87 BC) broke out following an insurrection in the city of Asculum: after having killed the Roman proconsul Quintus Servilius and the legate Fonteius, the people of Asculum massacred the entire Roman population of the city. Subsequently, the Piceni and the other Italic peoples (except the Etruscans and the Umbrians) joined together and made their own capital, Corfinium. The Piceni were therefore the main inspirers, with Peligni and Marsi, of the whole coalition; the Italian army, divided into two branches, one Sabellic led by Quintus Poppaedius Silo, the other Samnite led by Gaius Papius Mutilus, had contingents of numerous peoples while the Piceni were led by Gaius Vidacilius and Publius Ventidius Bassus.

The initial phases of the conflict took place in Picenum, between Asculum and Firmum; the Picene commanders defeated Gnaeus Pompeius Strabo near Falerone (90 BC), forcing him to retreat and find refuge in Firmum, which was besieged. Meanwhile, in the summer of the same year the commander Vidacilius rushed to support the Peligni in battle, and Ventidius Bassus was sent on a diplomatic mission to the Etruscans and Umbrians to induce them to support the Italian cause; parallel to this, Pompeius Strabo received the support of a Roman contingent, sent to break the siege of the Piceni. The latter thus found themselves having to contend with the Romans on two fronts: the threat was in fact brought both by the besieged inside the city, who could make sorties, and by the troops that had just arrived in Fermo; they were thus defeated, also suffering the loss of the general left to lead the siege, the Marsian Titus Lafrenius.

Picentes were, however, divided during the War, with some fighting against Rome for the Roman citizenship and others remaining loyal.

With the troops left after the battle of Firmum, Pompeius Strabo moved towards Asculum, besieging it. Shortly after, the commander Vidacilius went north with the intention of freeing the besieged; however, while managing to break through the enemy lines and enter the city, upon his arrival, he did not find his fellow citizens willing to oppose the siege as he had requested; disappointed and indignant by this attitude, Vidacilius took his own life.

In 89 BC, an army of Marsi tried to undermine the Roman encirclement of the Piceni capital, but failed; the city finally fell that year, was razed to the ground, and its citizens were deprived of all property. The fall of Asculum marked the definitive defeat of the Italians. At the end of the conflict, the Piceni were ascribed to the Fabia tribe, obtaining Roman citizenship and completing the Romanisation process of the Piceno population, which began in the 3rd century BC.

==== Empire ====
Regions of Augustan Italy

In 27 BC, Augustus established a colony at Asculum. The territory inhabited by the Piceni during the Augustan age was divided between Regio V (Picenum) and Regio VI (Umbria et ager gallicus picenus). It was reunified during the empire of Diocletian in the Flaminia et Picenum region.

=== Myth ===
There is a legend that a woodpecker (Latin: picus) led the way to Picenum for the people who became the Picentini, and a folk etymology of their ethnonym was "those of the woodpecker." For this reason the green woodpecker is the modern emblem of the Marche region.

== Culture ==
Excavations in Picenum have given much insight into the region during the Iron Age. Excavated tombs in Novilara of the Molaroni and Servici cemeteries show that the Piceni laid bodies in the ground wrapped in garments they had worn in life.

Warriors were buried with a helmet, weapons, and vessels for food and drinks. Buried beads, bone, fibulae, and amber seem to demonstrate that there was an active trade in the ninth and perhaps tenth centuries on the Adriatic coast, especially in the fields of amber and beads of glass paste. In women’s graves there is a large abundance of ornaments made of bronze and iron. The origins of these items may also show that the Piceni may have looked to the south and east for development. The warrior tombs seem to show that the Piceni were a war-like people. Every man’s grave contained more or less a complete outfit of a warrior, with the most frequent weapon being a spear. Piceni swords appear to be imported from the Balkans.

Excavations at the 8th-7th century BCE necropolis by Novilara revealed that weapons frequently appeared in male burials, whereas female burials, particularly those belonging to older adult women, often contained textile products. In general, at Novilara, the grave goods most typically associated with gender roles, such as weaponry or textiles, usually only appeared in the graves of individuals who had reached adolescence. Furthermore, female graves usually contained a greater number of goods than male burials: Women were more likely to be interred with over four funerary items, whereas men were more likely to be entombed with 1-3 grave items, or—in some cases—none. Amber decorations are characteristic of female Picene burials, with personal adornments embroidered with amber beads, buttons, or pendants featuring prominently in female graves. Male Picene tombs typically displayed less ostentatious funerary items, though—during the Orientalizing period—princely graves came to include fine armor and pottery, thereby matching the level of wealth in the princely burials of the neighboring Latial and Etruscan cultures.

At the cemetery by Belmonte Piceno, there were several women buried with—alongside the standard personal ornaments—chariots, spears, and maces, perhaps indicating the presence of 'warrior women.' Though, it is alternatively possible that these women did not serve as actual fighters but were instead ceremonially honored for characteristics sometimes associated with warriors, such as courage or nobility. The Capestrano warrior statuette, though its precise interpretation remains unclear, may provide evidence contradicting the notion of a strict connection between militarism and masculinity found elsewhere in prehistoric Italy. This figurine is ambiguously sexed: It lacks breasts and shows a generally masculine body fat distribution across the upper body, but it is also portrayed with a feminine waist–hip ratio and a small incision on the pelvis indicative of female genitalia.

Several large bronze rings ranging from 15–20 centimetres (5.9–7.9 in) in diameter have been uncovered in 6th-5th century BCE tombs, usually female, situated between the Tronto and Tenna rivers. It is possible that these objects were in some way associated with the cult of Cupra, as they were found in the proximity of Cupra Marittima, though the archaeologist Eleanor Betts nevertheless describes this evidence as "circumstantial." Typically, the rings were deposited on the pelvis of the deceased or in one of their hands, most usually the right. Certain burials include rings in both positions, though some only contain the rings in one location. The placement near the pelvis may indicate a connection with female fertility, whereas the position by the hand could reflect more martial symbolism, perhaps commemorating victories or achievements in combat. According to Betts, the rings may have been symbolically connected with life and death, themselves concepts associated with the deity Cupra, potentially indicating that the deceased had served as religious figures dedicated to the goddess. Ultimately, Betts proposes that the possible symbolic value of the rings may imply that the "warrior ideology" dominant throughout Picene material culture could apply to both women and men.

== Genetics ==
A 2024 study analysed the Ancient DNA of 71 Iron Age Picene individuals from the necropoleis of Novilara and Sirolo-Numana.

Genome analysis showed that the two Picene groups are genetically homogeneous and in continuity with earlier cultures. Moreover, despite an overall genetic similarity among Iron Age Italic populations, the analysis revealed small but significant differences in their genetics. In particular, the Adriatic populations (Picentes and Daunians) display a greater proportion of a genetic component deriving from the Pontic–Caspian steppe than the Tyrrhenian populations—the Etruscans and the Latins.

The principal genetic ancestries of the two Picene groups consist of components from the Anatolian Neolithic or Early European Farmers and from Eastern Hunter-Gatherers (EHG)/Yamnaya (also known as Western Steppe Herders); together these account for 90% of their genetic heritage. In addition, despite the overall genetic homogeneity of populations belonging to the Picene culture, some individuals show non-local ancestries. This evidence, together with data for other contemporary peoples, suggests that the Iron Age (or the immediately preceding period) was characterized by intense population movements and marked the beginning of a cosmopolitan society in Italy.

Two main paternal haplogroups are observed among the Picenes, namely R1b-M269/L23 (58% of the total) and J2-M172/M12 (25% of the total), which may represent direct links with Central Europe and the Balkan Peninsula.

Finally, phenotype analysis shows that individuals associated with the Picene culture possessed lighter pigmentation than contemporary peoples. A higher frequency of blond hair and blue eyes occurs among the Picenes when compared with the Etruscans, Latins, and Daunians.

=== Haplogroups ===
A 2017 analysis of maternal haplogroups from ancient and modern samples indicated a substantial genetic similarity among the modern inhabitants of Central Italy and the area's ancient pre-Roman inhabitants of settlement of Novilara in the province of Pesaro, and evidence of substantial genetic continuity in the region from pre-Roman times to the present with regard to mitochondrial DNA.

== Language ==
From Ancona southward, a language of the Umbrian group was originally spoken, today called South Picene, attested mainly in inscriptions. North of Ancona, around Pesaro, a non-Italic language termed North Picene, written in a version of the Old Italic script, is attested by four inscriptions (three of which are very brief). Both the meaning of the inscriptions and the relationship of North Picene to other languages remain unknown. There is phonological evidence that it was linked more closely to the Indo-European language family (than to, for example, Etruscan).

=== Ethnonym ===
One endonym of the Picentes, or at least the South Picenes, may be Pupeneis or, according to Edward Togo Salmon "something similar", as this apparently ethnic name is used in four South Picenian language inscriptions found near Ascoli Piceno. Later refinements of the argument connected it to the Latin name Poponius, as in inscription TE 1 found near Teramo:

apaes ...púpúnis nir
"Appaes ... a Poponian man"

The connection between Poponian and Picentes, if any, remains obscure.

There is no mention in ancient sources of the endonym used by the North Picenes.

The first document to mention the Latin exonym Picentes is the Fasti triumphales, which records for 268/267 BC a triumph given to Publius Sempronius Sophus for a victory de Peicentibus, "over the Picentes," where the -ei- is an Old Latin form. The entire group of Latin Picene words delivered subsequently appears to follow the standard rules for Latin word formation. The root is Pīc-, provenience and meaning yet unknown. The extended Pīc-ēn- is used to form a second-declension adjective, appearing in such phrases as Pīcēnus ager, "Picene country," Pīcēnae olivae, "Picene olives", and the neuter used as a noun, Pīcēnum. These are not references to any people, *Pīcēni, but to the country. Pīcēnus used alone implies Pīcēnus ager, the "Picene (country)" and does not mean one resident of Picenum. This adjective is never used of the people.

For the people, a third-declension adjective stem is formed: Pīc-ent-, used in Pīcens and Pīcentes, "a Picentine" and "the Picentines," which are nouns formed from the adjective. This adjective can be used of people or of other words, as well as in a second formation of the name of the country, Pīcentum. From it comes a final name of the people, Pīcentini. The historical order in which these words appeared or whether they came from each other remains unknown.

== Prominent Picentes ==
=== Gentes of Picentine origin ===
- Afrania gens
- Annia gens
- Nasidiena (gens)
- Pasidiena gens
- Pilia (gens)
- Saturia gens

== See also ==
- Picenum
- North Picene language
- South Picene language
- Ancient peoples of Italy
- Coinage of Picenum

== Bibliography ==
- Betts, Eleanor (2013-04-01). "Cubrar matrer: goddess of the Picenes?". Accordia Research Papers.
- Catacchio, Nuccia Negroni (2011). "Amber and the Warrior Princes of the Orientalising Period in Italy". In Vianello, Andrea (ed.). Exotica in the Prehistoric Mediterranean. Oxbow Books. ISBN 978-1-84217-424-1. JSTOR j.ctvh1ds6z.
- Randall-MacIver, David (1927). The Iron Age in Italy. A Study of Those Aspects of the Early Civilizations Which Are Neither Villanovan or Etruscan. Oxford: Clarendon Press.
- Laffranchi, Zita; Beck De Lotto, Michael A.; Delpino, C.; Lösch, Sandra; Milella, Marco (2021-10-07). "Social differentiation and well-being in the Italian Iron Age: exploring the relationship between sex, age, biological stress, and burial complexity among the Picenes of Novilara (8th–7th c. BC)". Archaeological and Anthropological Sciences. 13 (11): 182. doi:10.1007/s12520-021-01449-3. hdl:10481/71274. ISSN 1866-9565.
- Whitehouse, Ruth D. (2001). "Exploring gender in prehistoric Italy". Papers of the British School at Rome. 69: 49–96. doi:10.1017/S0068246200001768. ISSN 2045-239X.
