= Pasidia gens =

Ancient Roman family

The gens Pasidia was an obscure plebeian family at ancient Rome. No members of this gens achieved any of the higher offices of the Roman state, but several are known from inscriptions.

== Origin ==
Pasidius appears to belong to a class of gentilicia derived from other names, chiefly cognomina, using the suffix -idius. Morphologically, this implies that the name was formed from another name or word ending in -idus, but as with other gentile-forming suffixes, -idius became stereotyped, and was sometimes used in cases when there was no morphological justification for it. There is no trace of a cognomen Pasidus, so the original root of the nomen is unclear, unless it is treated as an orthographic variant of Pacidius, in which case the root may be the Oscan praenomen Paccius. In any case, Pasidius seems to be the source for another nomen, Pasidienus, derived from Pasidius using the gentile-forming suffix -enus, not normally found in names of Latin origin, but typical of names from Picenum and Umbria.

== Members ==
This list includes abbreviated praenomina. For an explanation of this practice, see filiation.

- Titus Pasidius Felix, one of the Seviri Augustales at Trebula Mutuesca.
- Pasidius Fortunatus, son of Felix and Theophila, buried at Rome, aged sixteen years, two months.
- Lucius Pasidius Isidorus, named in two inscriptions from Cortona.
- Pasidia L. l. Januaria, a freedwoman buried at Mediolanum in Cisalpine Gaul.
- Pasidia Restituta, wife of Marcus Arrius Anicetus, named in an inscription from Luceria in Apulia.
- Titus Pasidius P. f. Sabineus, named in an inscription found at Carboneros, originally in Hispania Citerior.

== See also ==
- List of Roman gentes

== Bibliography ==
- Theodor Mommsen et alii, Corpus Inscriptionum Latinarum (The Body of Latin Inscriptions, abbreviated CIL), Berlin-Brandenburgische Akademie der Wissenschaften (1853–present).
- René Cagnat et alii, L'Année épigraphique (The Year in Epigraphy, abbreviated AE), Presses Universitaires de France (1888–present).
- George Davis Chase, "The Origin of Roman Praenomina", in Harvard Studies in Classical Philology, vol. VIII (1897).
- Steven L. Tuck, Latin Inscriptions in the Kelsey Museum: The Dennison & De Criscio Collections, University of Michigan Press, Ann Arbor (2005).
