= Anna Marinetti =

Linguist and author (1955-)

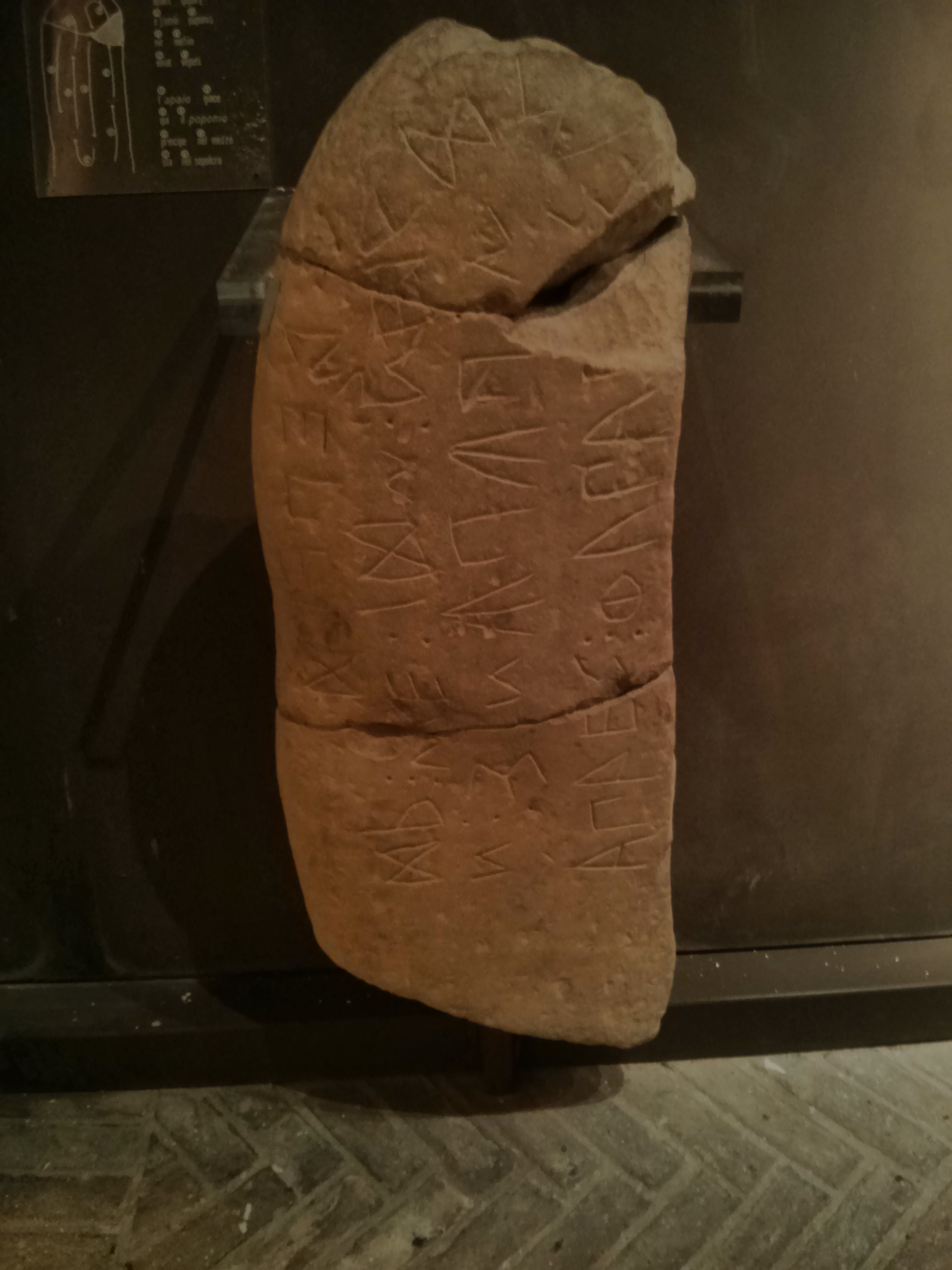
Inscribed stele from the Loro Picene Municipality.

Anna Marinetti (born 1955, Venice) is an Italian linguist whose research focuses on the historical linguistics of pre-Roman Italy. She is best known for her decipherment of the South Picene script in 1985 and her contributions to scholarship on the Italic languages.

== Career ==
Marinetti graduated in 1978 with a degree in Lettere (Letters) from the University of Padua, where she studied with Aldo Prosdocimi. From 1985 to 1987, she taught at the Istituto Universitario di Lingue Moderne in Milan. In 1987, she was appointed to a position as a full professor at the University of Bari, and then in 1990 as a full professor of linguistics at Ca' Foscari, University of Venice.

From 1991 to 1996, she was Director of the Department of Classical Studies and Tradition (Dipartimento di Antichità e Tradizione classica), and from 1997 to 2003 and 2006 to 2009, she was Director of the Department of Ancient and Oriental Studies (Dipartimento di Scienze dell’Antichità e del Vicino Oriente).

She is the editor of the Rivista di Epigrafia Italica and the Studi Etruschi published by the Istituto Nazionale di Studi Etruschi ed Italici. She also works with the Reitia Research Unit at the Department of Prehistoric Archaeology at the University of Cologne.

In Marinetti's 1985 book on the South Picene texts of pre-Roman, she introduced a new transcription of the characters which is now widely used in scholarship. She showed that in South Picene script, the character ⟨.⟩ is a reduced ⟨o⟩ and the character ⟨:⟩ is a reduced ⟨8⟩, used for /f/. The script was considered partially undeciphered prior to Marinetti's breakthrough. Her contribution allowed the language to be studied in full, revealing 'texts of considerable linguistic and cultural interest', including several poetic texts.

== Publications ==
- Sudpiceno. Elmo da Canosa di Puglia (BA). Stele di Belmonte Piceno (AP). Saggio di revisione, in: Studi Etruschi XLVI (1978) 405–409.
- Il sudpiceno come italico (e sabino?). Note preliminari, in: Studi Etruschi XLIX (1981) 113–158.
- Lingue e dialetti dell’Italia antica. Indici, Istituto di Glottologia e Fonetica dell’Università di Padova, Padua 1982, S. 89–298.
- Le iscrizioni sudpicene, Bd. I: Testi, Olschki, Florenz 1985.
- with Marcello Meli: Ferdinand de Saussure. Le leggende germaniche. Scritti scelti ed annotati, Zielo, Este 1986.
- Le tavolette alfabetiche di Este, in: Maristella Pandolfini Angeletti, Aldo Prosdocimi (Hrsg.): Alfabetari e insegnamento della scrittura in Etruria e nell’Italia antica, Olschki, Florence 1990, S. 95–142.
- Nuove iscrizioni retiche dall’area veronese, in: Studi Etruschi LXX (2004) 408–420.
- Le iscrizioni venetiche dal santuario in località Fornace di Altino (VE), in: Studi Etruschi LXXIII 2007 [2009] 421–450.
- Schrift und Sprache im antiken Italien, in: Rupert Gebhard (Hrsg.): Im Licht des Südens. Begegnungen der antiken Kulturen zwischen Mittelmeer und Zentraleuropa, Josef Fink, München 2011, S. 178–183.
- Le iscrizioni del santuario di Reitia a Este (scavi 1880–1916 e 1987–1991) = Die Inschriften aus dem Reitia-Heiligtum von Este (Ausgrabungen 1880–1916 und 1987–1991) (= Il santuario di Reitia a Este. Band 10; = Studien zu vor- und frühgeschichtlichen Heiligtümern. Band 11). Nünnerich-Asmus, Oppenheim 2024, ISBN 978-3-96176-264-4.
