= Pasidiena gens =

Ancient Roman family

The gens Pasidiena, occasionally found as Passidiena, and perhaps the same as Passidinia, was an obscure plebeian family at ancient Rome. It is chiefly known from two individuals who held the consulship during the first century.

== Origin ==
The morphology of the nomen Pasidienus indicates that the family was probably not of Latin origin. The gentile-forming suffix -enus was typical of names from Picenum and the vicinity, suggesting that the Pasidieni were of Picentine or Umbrian descent. Names of this class were frequently formed from other gentiles. Pasidienus would therefore have been derived from an older nomen, Pasidius, which is indeed found in a number of instances. The suffix -idius was originally used to form gentilicia from cognomina ending in -idus; but as with other gentile-forming suffixes, -idius was stereotyped, and occasionally appears in cases where there is no morphological justification. There is no evidence of a corresponding cognomen, Pasidus.

== Branches and cognomina ==
Firmus, referring to someone strong or hardy, is the only surname associated with the Pasidieni.

== Members ==
- Publius Pasidienus Firmus, proconsul of Bithynia during the reign of Claudius. It is unclear whether he should be identified with the consul of 65.
- Publius Pasidienus Firmus (Note: Gallivan gives his name as Aulus Licinius Nerva Silianus Pasidienus Firmus, which interpretation is suggested by AE 1946, 124; but AE 1978, 658 demonstrates that Aulus Licinius Nerva Silianus was the colleague of Publius Pasidienus Firmus, and not the same man. The second inscription was not yet published when Gallivan addressed the consuls of 65.) was consul in AD 65, during the reign of Nero.
- Lucius Pasidienus Firmus was consul in AD 75, with the future emperor Domitian.
- Passidiena P. l. Clymene, a freedwoman named in an inscription from the present site of Mompeo, originally in Sabinum.
- Passidinia, wife of Passidinius, buried at Cirta in Numidia.
- Passidinius, husband of Passidinia, buried at Cirta.

== See also ==
- List of Roman gentes

== Bibliography ==
- Theodor Mommsen et alii, Corpus Inscriptionum Latinarum (The Body of Latin Inscriptions, abbreviated CIL), Berlin-Brandenburgische Akademie der Wissenschaften (1853–present).
- René Cagnat et alii, L'Année épigraphique (The Year in Epigraphy, abbreviated AE), Presses Universitaires de France (1888–present).
- George Davis Chase, "The Origin of Roman Praenomina", in Harvard Studies in Classical Philology, vol. VIII (1897).
- Paul von Rohden, Elimar Klebs, & Hermann Dessau, Prosopographia Imperii Romani (The Prosopography of the Roman Empire, abbreviated PIR), Berlin (1898).
- Paul A. Gallivan, "Some Comments on the Fasti for the Reign of Nero", in Classical Quarterly, vol. 24, pp. 290–311 (1974), "The Fasti for A.D. 70–96", in Classical Quarterly, vol. 31, pp. 186–220 (1981).
- John C. Traupman, The New College Latin & English Dictionary, Bantam Books, New York (1995).
