= Saturia gens =

Ancient Roman family

The gens Saturia was an obscure plebeian family of equestrian rank at ancient Rome. Members of this gens are first mentioned in the time of Cicero, and a number of them had distinguished military careers, but none of them attained any of the higher offices of the Roman State.

== Origin ==
The nomen Saturius seems to be derived from satur, meaning "full", "plump", or "fertile", and is probably derived from the cognomen Saturus, as is the related Saturio. The Saturii were probably of Sabine or Picentine ancestry, as several of them bore the surnames Sabinus and Picens, both belonging to a common class of cognomen alluding to one's origins, and a number of the family resided at Asculum in Picenum.

== Praenomina ==
The main praenomina of the Saturii were Gaius, Lucius, and Publius, three of the most common names throughout Roman history.

== Members ==
This list includes abbreviated praenomina. For an explanation of this practice, see filiation.

- Saturia C. f., named in an inscription from Caere, dating to the second or first century BC.
- Publius Saturius, one of the judges who presided over the trial of Aulus Cluentius Habitus, and later opposed Cicero in the trial of the actor Quintus Roscius.
- Decimus Saturius L. l. Dama, a freedman who built a tomb at Rome for himself, Saturia Philoclea, and their household, dating to the first century BC.
- Saturia D. l. Philoclea, a freedwoman, perhaps of Decimus Saturius Dama, who built a tomb at Rome for them and their household in the first century BC.
- Saturia P. l. Rufa, a freedwoman named in an inscription from Falerii Nova, dating to the time of Augustus.
- Lucius Saturius Admetus, the freedman of Januarius, buried at Asculum in Picenum, in the first half of the first century AD.
- Saturius, the slave of Scaevinus, named in an inscription from Interamna Lirenas in Latium, dating to AD 38.
- Titus Saturius T. f. Celer, buried at Firmum in Picenum, in the first century.
- Marcus Saturius, one of the municipal duumvirs at Pompeii in Campania.
- Gaius Saturius Secundus, a cavalry prefect in Rhaetia during the reigns of Vespasian and Titus, named in inscriptions from Guntia, Augusta Vindelicorum, and Germanicum.
- Saturius Firmus, the son-in-law of Asinius Rufus, one of the intimate friends of both Tacitus and the younger Pliny, who speaks warmly of Saturius.
- Saturius, (Note: Called Satur in some manuscripts.) decurion of the chamberlains, was one of the assassins of Domitian in AD 96.
- Publius Saturius Sabinus, named in a first or second century inscription from Rome.
- Saturius, a scriba associated with a freedman of Trajan, buried at Rome together with his wife, Aurelia Severa, children, Januarius Aurelius Fortunatus and Victorinus, and foster-son, Saturius Felix.
- Saturius Felix, the foster-son of the scribe Saturius.
- Marcus Saturius M. f. Maximus, a native of Celeia in Noricum, was an eques serving in the tenth cohort of the Praetorian Guard at Rome, where he was buried some time in the second century, aged thirty, having served for twelve years. His heirs erected a monument in his memory.
- Gaius Saturius Sabinus, a native of Truentum, (Note: A colony at the mouth of the Truentus, now lost.) was a soldier serving in the century of Granius at Rome, circa AD 208.

=== Undated Saturii ===
- Saturia, buried at Rome, with a monument from her father, Saturius Lu[...].
- Saturia, buried in a family sepulchre at the present site of Stranice, formerly part of Noricum, together with her husband, Januarius Genialis.
- Saturia L. f., named in an inscription from Grumentum in Lucania.
- Saturius, buried at Narona in Dalmatia, together with his wife, Titia.
- Gaius Saturius T. f., named in an inscription from Cupra Maritima in Picenum.
- Lucius Saturius L. f., named in an inscription from Grumentum.
- Publius Saturius, freed a slave at Corcyra Nigra in fulfillment of a vow made to Publius Clemens.
- Saturius Antiochus, dedicated a tomb at Puteoli in Campania to his wife, Faenia Felicitas, a native of Syria, aged forty.
- Saturius Basilius, buried at Caurium in Lusitania, with a monument from his wife, Vibia Felicitas, with whom he lived for eleven years.
- Saturia L. l. Chia, a freedwoman, and the daughter of Staphinus, was buried at Asculum in Picenum, aged twenty-six, with a monument from her former master, Lucius Saturius Clemens.
- Lucius Saturius Clemens, built a tomb at Asculum in Picenum for his freedwoman, Saturia Chia.
- Lucius Saturius L. f. Cluia Laburius, military tribune of the sixth legion, buried at Venafrum in Samnium, aged forty-one.
- [Att...?] Saturia Erhennia, buried at Asculum with Gaius Saturius Sic[...]us, with a monument from Gaius Saturius Picens.
- Lucius Saturius Felix, named in an inscription from Carthage in Africa Proconsularis.
- Saturius Gratus, a scriba, who built a tomb at Puteoli for his wife, Aelia Felina, aged twenty-one years, three months, and eleven days.
- Saturius Lu[...], the father of Saturia, for whom he built a tomb at Rome.
- Lucius Saturius Maro, buried at Rome with monument from Pompeia Secundina.
- Quintus Saturius Q. f. Maximus, patron of the municipium of Nursia in Sabinum.
- Saturia Montana, buried at Sicca Veneria in Africa Proconsularis, aged seventy-five.
- Saturia Namampilla, buried at Castellum Celtianum in Numidia, aged one hundred.
- Lucius Saturius Optabilis, named in an inscription from Sulmo in Samnium.
- Saturia Picena, dedicated a tomb at Fundi in Latium to her son, Minucius Rufus.
- Gaius Saturius Picens, built a tomb at Asculum for Gaius Saturius Sic[...]us and Saturia Erhennia.
- Lucius Saturius Picens, a centurion primus pilus, dedicated a monument at Pisae in Etruria to his son, Gaius Saturius Secundus, an accomplished young soldier.
- Gaius Saturius Popularis, named in an inscription from Carthago Nova in Hispania Citerior.
- Saturia Q. f. Prisca, named in an inscription from Nursia.
- Saturius Sabinus, built a tomb at Rome for his wife, Sulpicia Mamorina.
- Gaius Saturius Secundus, a procurator assigned to Gallia Narbonensis.
- Gaius Saturius L. f. Secundus, son of Lucius Saturius Picens, was an eques, prefect of a cohort of soldiers, augur, and patron of the colony at Asculum. He was buried at Pisae, aged nineteen years and twenty-seven days, with a monument from his father.
- Gaius Saturius Sic[...]us, buried at Asculum with Saturia Erhennia, with a monument from Gaius Saturius Picens.
- Saturia Ɔ. l. Thelis, a freedwoman named in an inscription from Rome.
- Lucius Saturius Theodotus, buried at Rome with a monument from Asinnia Philumene.
- Lucius Saturius Theophilus, buried at Rome, in a tomb built by his brother, Publius Pactumeius Aphrodisius.
- Saturia L. f. Victoria, buried at Furnos Minus in Africa Proconsularis, aged fourteen.

== See also ==
- List of Roman gentes

== Bibliography ==
- Marcus Tullius Cicero, Pro Cluentio, Pro Quinto Roscio Comoedo.
- Gaius Plinius Caecilius Secundus (Pliny the Younger), Epistulae (Letters).
- Gaius Suetonius Tranquillus, De Vita Caesarum (Lives of the Caesars, or The Twelve Caesars).
- Theodor Mommsen et alii, Corpus Inscriptionum Latinarum (The Body of Latin Inscriptions, abbreviated CIL), Berlin-Brandenburgische Akademie der Wissenschaften (1853–present).
- Dictionary of Greek and Roman Biography and Mythology, William Smith, ed., Little, Brown and Company, Boston (1849).
- Wilhelm Henzen, Ephemeris Epigraphica: Corporis Inscriptionum Latinarum Supplementum (Journal of Inscriptions: Supplement to the Corpus Inscriptionum Latinarum, abbreviated EE), Institute of Roman Archaeology, Rome (1872–1913).
- George Davis Chase, "The Origin of Roman Praenomina", in Harvard Studies in Classical Philology, vol. VIII, pp. 103–184 (1897).
- Paul von Rohden, Elimar Klebs, & Hermann Dessau, Prosopographia Imperii Romani (The Prosopography of the Roman Empire, abbreviated PIR), Berlin (1898).
- Stéphane Gsell, Inscriptions Latines de L'Algérie (Latin Inscriptions from Algeria, abbreviated ILAlg), Edouard Champion, Paris (1922–present).
