= Pilia gens =

Ancient Roman plebeian family

The gens Pilia was an obscure plebeian family at ancient Rome. None of the Pilii attained any of the higher magistracies of the Roman state, and members of this gens are known primarily through the writings of Cicero, who was acquainted with a family of this name; but many others are known from inscriptions.

== Origin ==
Chase classifies the nomen Pilius among the non-Latin gentilicia originating from various parts of Italy, although he was unable to be more specific.

== Praenomina ==
The main praenomina used by the Pilii were Marcus, Publius, Quintus, and Gaius, four of the most common names throughout Roman history. Lucius, Aulus, and Manius are found in filiations.

== Members ==
This list includes abbreviated praenomina. For an explanation of this practice, see filiation.

- Marcus Pilius, possibly the father-in-law of Atticus, sold an estate to Gaius Albanius, circa 45 BC.
- Pilia (M. f.), the wife of Cicero's close friend, Titus Pomponius Atticus, whom she married in 56 BC.
- Quintus Pilius (M. f.) Celer, probably the brother-in-law of Atticus, served under Caesar during the Gallic Wars. In 51 BC, he accused Marcus Servilius of repetundae, maladministration or extortion in the governance of his province. Cicero asked Atticus to send him a copy of Celer's speech.
- Publius Pilius P. l. Anops, a freedman buried at Luceria in Apulia, together with Pilia Apicula and her son, Publius Pilius Felix, in a tomb dating to the early first century AD.
- Pilia Ɔ. l. Apicula, a freedwoman, was buried at Luceria, with her son, Publius Pilius Felix, and Publius Pilius Anops.
- Publius Pilius P. l. Felix, a freedman, was buried at Luceria with his mother, Pila Apicula, and Publius Pilius Anops.
- Pilia P. l. Selenis, buried at Luceria during the early first century AD.
- Marcus Pilius S. f. Priscus, named in a dedicatory inscription from Trebula Mutusca in Samnium, dating to AD 60.
- Pilia Psaechas, the widow of Lucius Mummius Restitutus, who was buried at Albintimilium in Liguria during the second century AD. They were married for forty years.

=== Undated Pilii ===
- Pilia A. f., buried at Tarquinii in Etruria, aged sixty-five.
- Pilia L. f., buried at Amiternum in Samnium.
- Marcus Pilius, mentioned in an inscription from Pompeii.
- Pilia M. l. Andromaca, a freedwoman buried at Narbo in Gallia Narbonensis.
- Marcus Pilius M. l. Antiochus, a freedman named in a funerary inscription from Rome.
- Pilia C. l. Callistenis, a freedwoman named in an inscription from Rome.
- Pilia C. l Cleopatra, named in an inscription from Rome.
- Marcus Pilius Dius, mentioned in an inscription from Rome.
- Pilia C. l. Chreste, named in an inscription from Rome.
- Marcus Pilius P. l. Chrestus, a freedman named in a funerary inscription from Rome.
- Marcus Pilius M. l. Diophantus, a freedman named in an inscription from Narbo.
- Marcus Pilius Eros, named in a funerary inscription from Rome.
- Marcus Pilius Eucarpus, a freedman who dedicated a monument at Rome to his wife, Pilia Philtatae.
- Pilia Euterpe, buried at Ostia, aged eighteen years, five months, and twenty-two days.
- Pilia M. l. Flora, a freedwoman named in a funerary inscription from Rome.
- Pilia Ɔ. l. Hilara, a freedwoman buried at Teanum Apulum in Apulia.
- Marcus Pilius M. l. Hilarus, a freedman named in a funerary inscription from Rome.
- Pilia Philtatae, buried at Rome, with a monument dedicated by her husband, Marcus Pilius Eucarpus.
- Pilia M. l. Prima, a freedwoman named in a funerary inscription from Rome.
- Pilia Primitiva, buried at Ostia.
- Pilia L. f. Quarta, wife of Marcus Calpetanus, buried at Rome.
- Pilia M'. l. Quarta, a freedwoman, and the wife of Musaeus, was buried at Rome, aged twenty-three.
- Gaius Pilius C. f. Rufus, a quattuorvir buried at Tarquinii, aged fifty-seven.
- Pilia Simne, wife of Aemilius Secundus, named in a funerary inscription from Rome.
- Gaius Pilius C. l. Surus, a freedman named in an inscription from Rome.
- Marcus Pilius M. l. Timoplastes, named in an inscription from Rome.
- Quintus Pilius Ɔ. l. Tyrrsus, a freedman named in an inscription from Rome.

== See also ==
- List of Roman gentes

== Bibliography ==
- Marcus Tullius Cicero, Epistulae ad Atticum, Epistulae ad Familiares, Epistulae ad Quintum Fratrem.
- Wilhelm Drumann, Geschichte Roms in seinem Übergang von der republikanischen zur monarchischen Verfassung, oder: Pompeius, Caesar, Cicero und ihre Zeitgenossen, Königsberg (1834–1844).
- Dictionary of Greek and Roman Biography and Mythology, William Smith, ed., Little, Brown and Company, Boston (1849).
- Theodor Mommsen et alii, Corpus Inscriptionum Latinarum (The Body of Latin Inscriptions, abbreviated CIL), Berlin-Brandenburgische Akademie der Wissenschaften (1853–present).
- Notizie degli Scavi di Antichità (News of Excavations from Antiquity, abbreviated NSA), Accademia dei Lincei (1876–present).
- René Cagnat et alii, L'Année épigraphique (The Year in Epigraphy, abbreviated AE), Presses Universitaires de France (1888–present).
