= Edoardo Brizio =

Italian archaeologist

Edoardo Brizio (March 3, 1846, Turin – May 5, 1907, Bologna) was an Italian archaeologist. He was a student of Giuseppe Fiorelli’s school of archaeology in Pompeii. Brizio became a professor of archaeology at the University of Bologna in 1876, and later director of the Museo Civico of Bologna. He is notable for advancing the theory that the Terramare population had been the original Ligurians.
