= South Picene language =

Ancient Italic language

South Picene
- Old Sabellic
- Native to: Picenum
- Region: Marche, Italy
- Era: attested 6th–4th century BC
- Language family: Indo-European: Italic; Osco-Umbrian; South Picene
- Writing system: Picene alphabets

Language codes
- ISO 639-3: spx
- Glottolog: sout2618
- Ethnolinguistic map of Italy in the Iron Age, before the Roman expansion and conquest of Italy

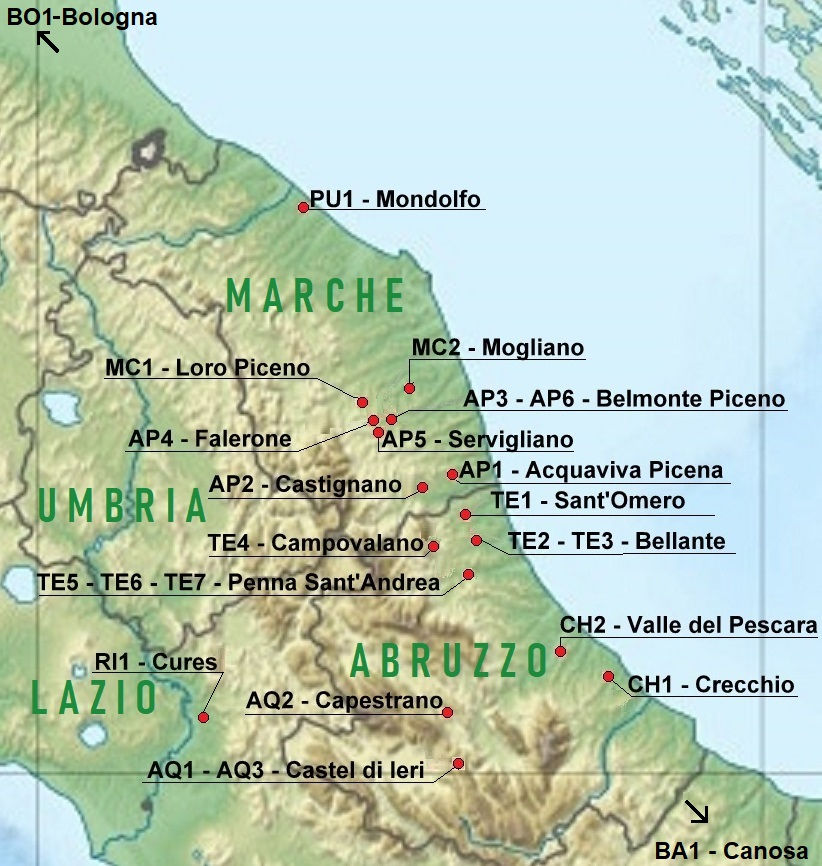
Map of Picene inscriptions.

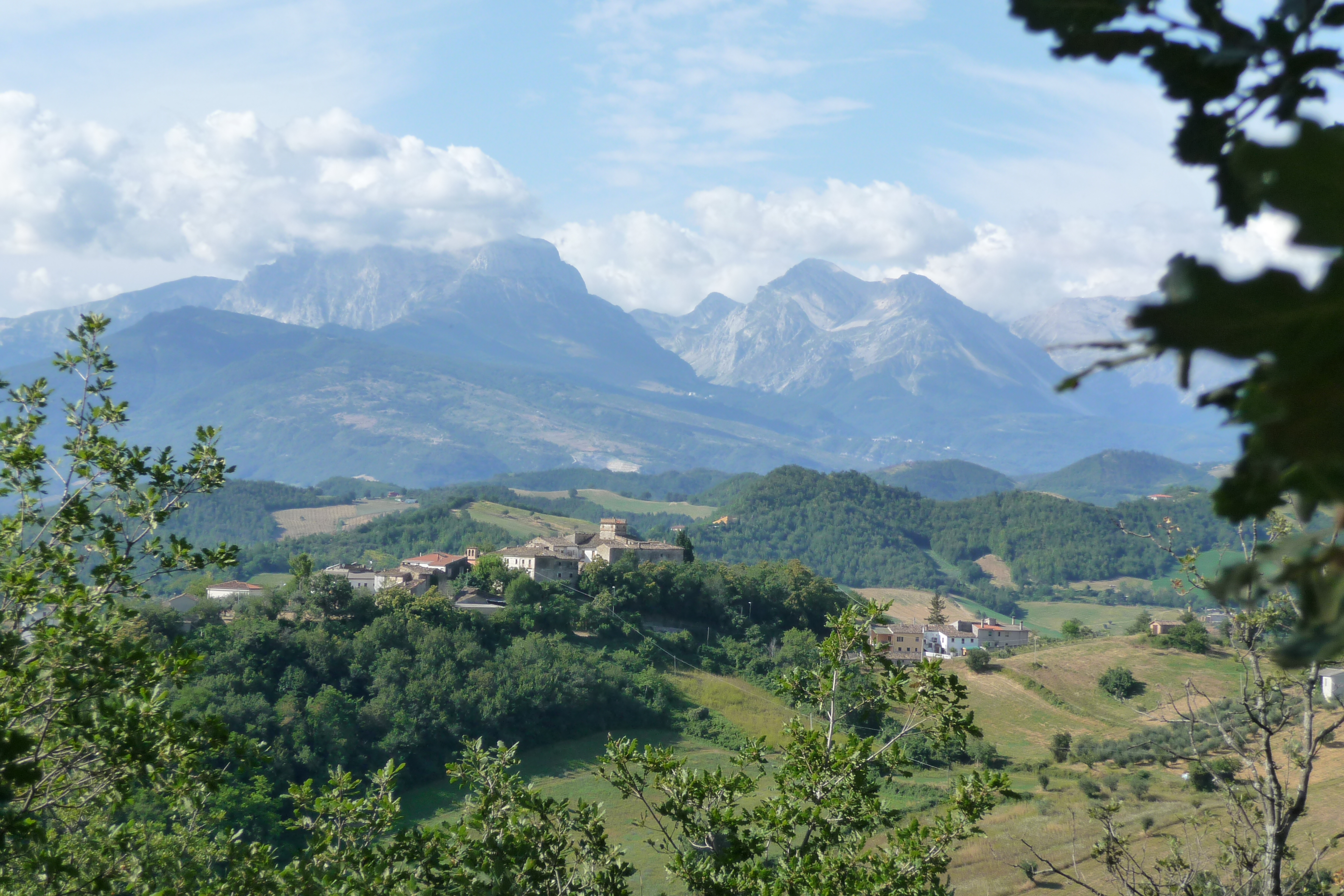
South Picene country in Teramo.

South Picene (also known as Paleo-Sabellic, Mid-Adriatic or Eastern Italic) is an extinct Italic language belonging to the Sabellic subfamily. It is apparently unrelated to the North Picene language, which is not understood and therefore unclassified. South Picene texts were at first relatively inscrutable even though some words were clearly Indo-European. The discovery in 1983 that two of the apparently redundant punctuation marks were in reality simplified letters led to an incremental improvement in their understanding and a first translation in 1985. Difficulties remain. It may represent a third branch of Sabellic, along with Oscan and Umbrian (and their dialects), or the whole Sabellic linguistic area may be best regarded as a linguistic continuum. The paucity of evidence from most of the 'minor dialects' contributes to these difficulties.

== Corpus ==
The corpus of South Picene inscriptions consists of 19 inscriptions on stone or bronze dating from as early as the 6th century BC to as late as the 4th century BC. The dating is estimated according to the features of the letters and in some cases the archaeological context. As the known history of the Picentes does not begin until their subjugation by Rome in the 3rd century, the inscriptions open an earlier window onto their culture as far back as the late Roman Kingdom. Most are stelai or cippi of sandstone or limestone in whole or fragmentary condition sculpted for funerary contexts, but some are monumental statues.

On a typical gravestone is the representation of the face or figure of the deceased with the inscription in a spiral around it or under it reading in a clockwise direction, or boustrophedon, or vertically. Stones have been found at Ascoli Piceno, Chieti, Teramo, Fano, Loro Piceno, Cures, the Abruzzi between the Tronto and the Aterno-Pescara, and Castel di Ieri and Crecchio south of the Aterno-Pescara. To them are added inscriptions on a bronze bracelet in central Abruzzi and two 4th-century BC helmets from Bologna in the Po Valley and Bari on the southeastern coast.

A complete inventory is as follows:

- the Cippus of Castignano (6th-century BC sandstone pyramid)
- three stelai of Penna Sant'Andrea at Teramo (a whole and two fragmentary limestone obelisks of the 1st half of the 5th century BC)
- the cover of the Campovalano pyxis (7th to 6th centuries BC)
- spiral bracelet of Chietino in Valle del Pescara (5th century BC)
- the Cippus of Cures (limestone)
- the Stele of Loro Piceno (sandstone)
- the Stele of Mogliano (sandstone)
- the Stele of Acquaviva
- the Stele of Belmonte (jointed sandstone)
- the Cippus of Falerone
- the Stele of Servigliano (sandstone)
- a fragment of inscribed sandstone at Belmonte
- the Cippus of Sant'Omero (sandstone)
- two stelai of Bellante (sandstone)
- the Stele of Crecchio (sandstone)
- two cippi of Castel di Ieri (limestone, whole and fragmentary)
- the Statue of Capestrano (limestone, life-size representation of king Nevio Pompuledio, 2nd half of the 7th, 1st half of the 6th centuries BC)
- the Helmet of Bologna (bronze)
- the Helmet of Apulia
South Picene inscriptions at National Archaeological Museum of the Marches

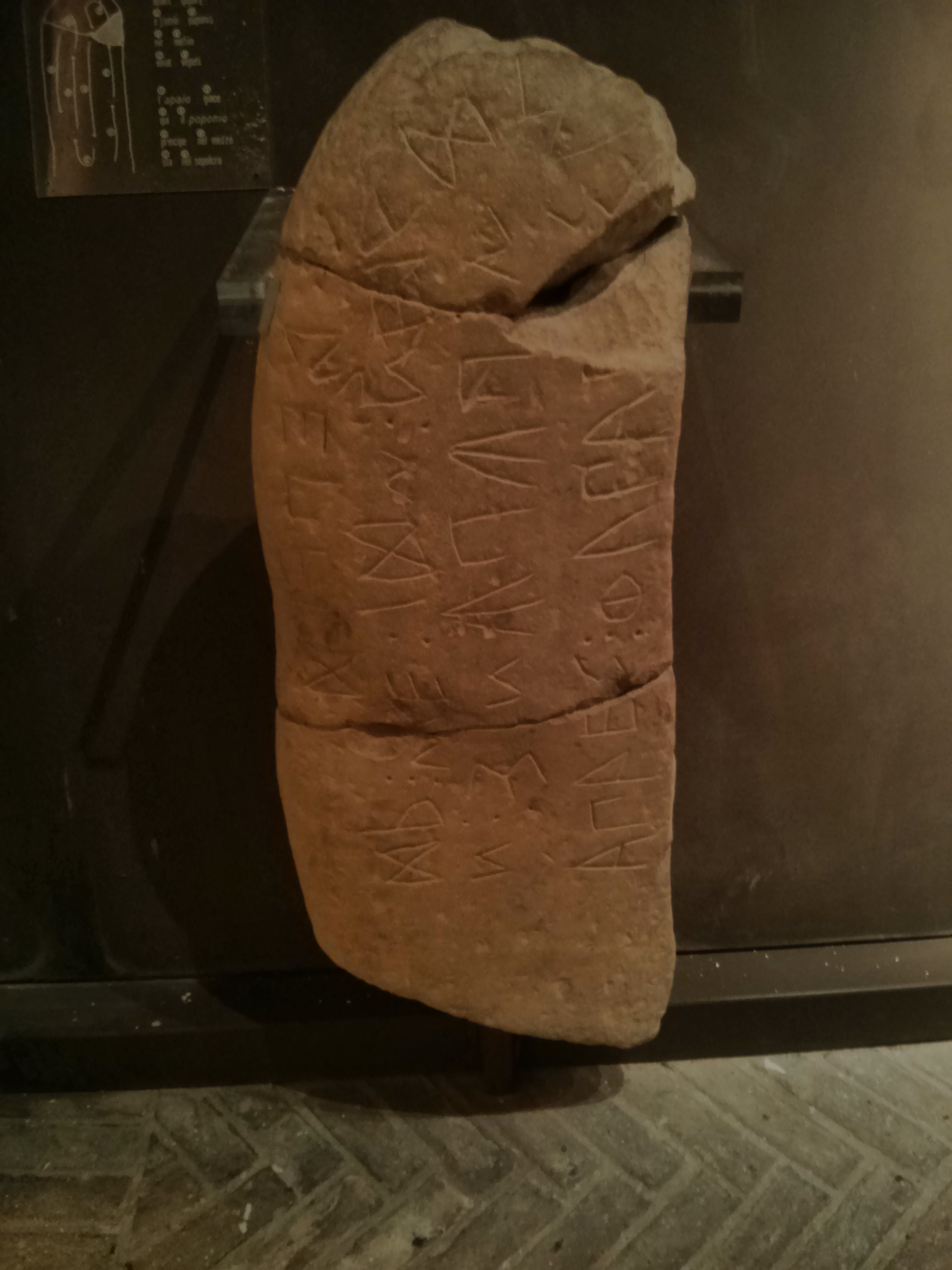
Stele of Loro Piceno

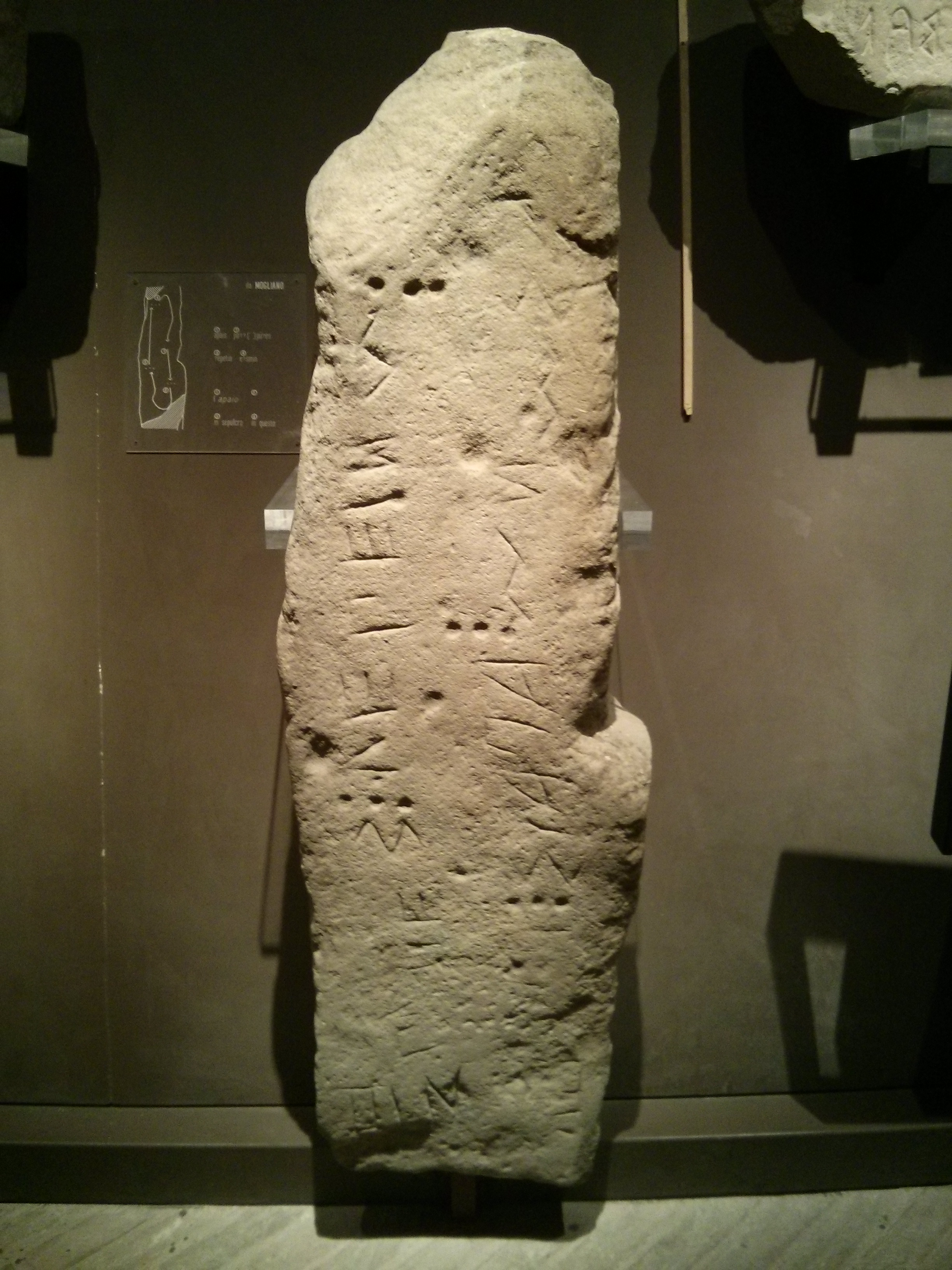
Stele of Mogliano

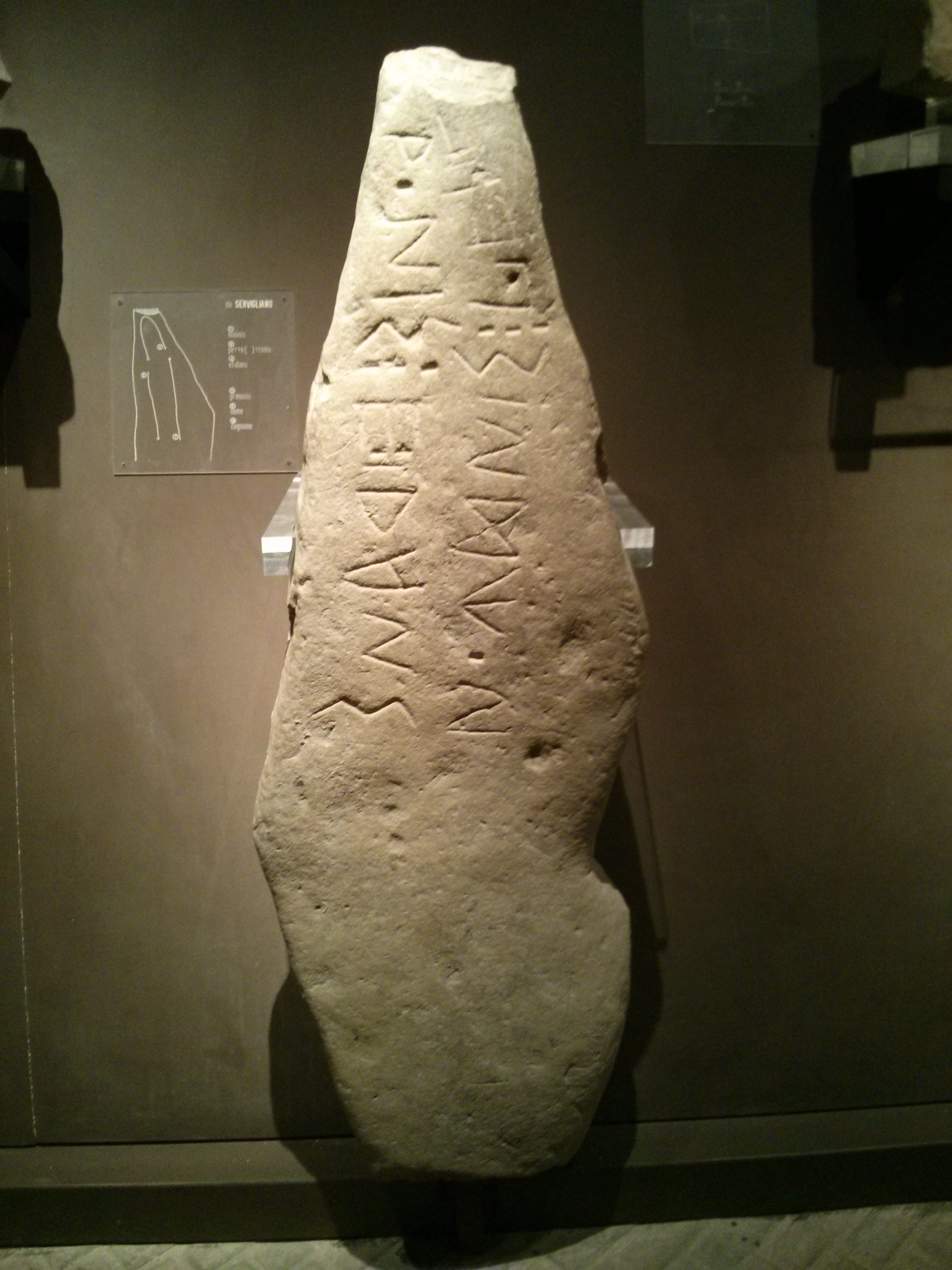
Stele of Servigliano

== Phonology ==
For consonants South Picene had:

		Labial	Alveolar	Palatal	Velar	Glottal
Plosive	voiceless	p ⟨p⟩	t ⟨t⟩		k ⟨k q⟩	
Plosive	voiced	b ⟨b⟩	d ⟨d⟩		ɡ ⟨k⟩	
Fricative		f ⟨:⟩	s ⟨s⟩			h ⟨h⟩
Nasal		m ⟨m⟩	n ⟨n⟩			
Liquid			r ⟨r⟩ l ⟨l⟩			
Approximant		w ⟨v u ú⟩		j ⟨i⟩		

In cases where there is a choice of grapheme the context determines which one applies. For the glides, ⟨v⟩ and ⟨u⟩ were used for word-initial /w/ and ⟨ú⟩ for intervocalic /w/ or in other special contexts. The table above omits special contexts.

== Alphabet ==
The south Picene alphabet, known from the 6th century BC, is most like the southern Etruscan alphabet in that it uses q for /k/ and k for /g/. It is:

⟨a b g d e v h i í k l m n o p q r s t u ú f *⟩

⟨.⟩ is a reduced ⟨o⟩ and ⟨:⟩ is a reduced ⟨8⟩, used for /f/. The script was considered partially undeciphered until Anna Marinetti made this breakthrough in her 1985 book on the South Picene texts.

== Grammar ==
An outline of South Picene grammar, comprising both its inflectional morphology and its syntax, is provided in Zamponi (2021).

=== Inflectional morphology ===
South Picene, like other Italic languages, is a fusional language that encodes multiple layers of grammatical information simultaneously in a given inflected form or ending.

==== Noun declension ====
South Picene nouns decline for two grammatical numbers (singular and plural) and six attested cases (nominative, accusative, genitive, dative, ablative, locative).

Nouns in South Picene possess an innate grammatical gender; adjectives must agree with their modified nouns in gender. Masculine and feminine adjective gender agreement is attested; neuter agreement is not.

Nouns are also divided into separate declension classes, which determine which endings for case and number they take. The declension classes are as follows:

- ā-stems, corresponding to the Latin first declension;
- o-stems, equivalent to the Latin second declension;
- u-stems, equivalent to the Latin fourth declension and only attested once in manus "hands" (ablative plural);
- i-stems;
- consonant stems; in Latin, they are grouped together with the i-stems to form the third declension.

Zamponi also presumes that a counterpart to the Latin fifth declension also existed in South Picene, but no such noun is attested.

The attested declensional endings for nouns include:

South Picene declensions
	ā-stems		o-stems		i-stems		consonant stems	
	Singular	Plural	Singular	Plural	Singular	Plural	Singular	Plural
Nominative	-a	?	-s	-ús	?		?	
Accusative	-am	-as	-úm	?	?		-em	-f
Genitive	-as	-asom	-es	-úm	-es	-iom	?	
Dative	?		-úí -oh	?	?		-eíh	?
Ablative	-ah	?	?		-ih	?	?	
Locative	-aih	?	-en -ín	?	-eí	?	-en	?

=== Syntax ===
Like in Latin, South Picene has rather free word order in terms of the position of the subject, object, and verb in a given sentence. For example:

ma kuprí koram opsút aninis
very well commemorative.stone.ACC make.PERF.3SG Aninius.NOM
"Aninius made the commemorative stone very well"

apaes qupat esmín
Appaeus.NOM lie.3SG here
"Appaeus lies here"

safinús estuf eśelsit múfqlúm
Sabines.NOM here erect.PRES.3PL monument.ACC
"The Sabines erect a monument here"

Nevertheless, some principles of South Picene syntax can be drawn. Many of the examples in this section are taken from Zamponi (2021).

==== Verbal clauses ====
Adverbs usually precede the verb they modify.

oftorim esmen adstaeoms
stele.ACC here set.up.PERF.1PL
"we set up a stele here"

Copular clauses consist of the complement followed by the copular verb:

a[l]sies esum
Alsius.GEN be.1SG
"I am [property] of Alsius"

uelaimes staties qora kduíú
Velaimus.GEN Statius.GEN commemorative.stone.NOM be.called.1SG
"I am [called] the commemorative stone for Velaimus Statius"

==== Noun phrases ====
In South Picene, adjectives and genitive noun phrases usually precede the nouns they modify:

kaúi-eis puql-oh
Gaius-GEN son-DAT
"for the son of Gaius"

safin-úm nerf
Sabines-GEN men-ACC
"the men of the Sabines"

Alínt-iom okr-eí
Alentes-GEN citadel-LOC
"in the Alentes' citadel"

púmpúni-s nír
Pomponian-NOM.SG man.NOM.SG
"the Pomponian man"

safin-as tút-as
Sabine-GEN.SG community-GEN.SG
"the Sabine community"

Demonstratives also must occur before their associated noun.

esm-a-k toút-aih
this-LOC.SG.F community-LOC.SG
"in this community"

esm-í-k vepet-í[n]
this-LOC.SG tomb-LOC.SG
"in this tomb"

== Sample text ==
Inscription Sp TE 2 on a gravestone from Bellante was studied by a linguist of Indo-European studies, Calvert Watkins, as an example of the earliest Italic poetry and as possibly a reflex of a Proto-Indo-European poetic form. In the inscription given below, as in the original inscription, three vertical dots ("the triple interpunct") are used to separate words.

postin ⁝ viam ⁝ videtas ⁝ tetis ⁝ tokam ⁝ alies ⁝ esmen ⁝ vepses ⁝ vepeten

"Along the road you see the 'toga' of Titus Alius? buried? in this tomb."

The translation of the questioned items is unclear. For toga Fortson suggests "covering."

Note the alliteration: viam and videtas; tetis and tokam; alies and esmen; vepses and vepeten. The possibility of this and the other inscriptions being stanzas of verse (strophes) was considered from the time of their discovery. Watkins called them "the South Picene strophe," which he defines as three lines of seven syllables each, comparing them to a strophe of the Rig Veda containing three lines of eight syllables each. Moreover, each line ends "in a trisyllable." The lines of this inscription are:

postin viam videtas
tetis tokam alies
esmen vepses vepeten

The first line would be syllabified and read:

po-stin vi-am vi-de-tas

== Bibliography ==
- Marinetti, Anna (1985). Le iscrizioni sudpicene. Florence: Olschki.
- Stuart-Smith, Jane (2004). Phonetics and philology: sound change in Italic. Oxford: Oxford University Press.
- Watkins, Calvert (1996). How to Kill a Dragon: Aspects of Indo-European Poetics. New York; Oxford: Oxford University Press.
- Zamponi, Raoul (2021). South Picene. Routledge World Languages. London; New York: Routledge.
