= North Picene language =

Ancient language of the Italian Peninsula

North Picene
- (possible hoax)
- Native to: Picenum
- Region: Marche, Italy
- Era: 1st millennium BCE
- Language family: unclassified
- Writing system: Picene alphabets

Language codes
- ISO 639-3: nrp
- Glottolog: nort1401
- Ethnolinguistic map of Italy in the Iron Age, before the Roman expansion and conquest of Italy

North Picene, also known as North Picenian or Northern Picene, is a supposed ancient language that may have been spoken in part of central-eastern Italy; alternatively the evidence for the language may be a hoax, with the language never having existed. The evidence for the language consists of four inscriptions apparently dating from the 1st millennium BC, three of them no more than small broken fragments. It is written in a form of the Old Italic alphabet. While its texts are easily transliterated, none of them have been translated so far. It is not possible to determine whether it is related to any other known language. Despite the use by modern scholars of a similar name, North Picene does not appear closely related to South Picene, and they may not be related at all. The total number of words in the inscriptions is about 60. It is not even certain that the inscriptions are all in one language.

The forerunner of the term North Picene was devised in 1933 by the linguist Joshua Whatmough, in Prae-Italic Dialects of Italy, a catalogue of texts in Italic languages. While neither Picene language could be read with any confidence at the time, Whatmough distinguished between six inscriptions in a central-east Italic language and all the rest southern. The northern later lost three and gained one. Before that work, all the inscriptions had been lumped together under a variety of names, such as "Sabellic".

A 2021 study of the techniques used on the stone and other considerations claimed that all supposed North Picene inscriptions are forgeries created in the 19th century, by an antique dealer from Fano. In a book-length analysis of North Picene texts, Belfiore, Sefano and Alessandro stated regarding the longest text: "On the whole, iconographic, paleographic, and technical features suggest that this stele is a forgery." They came to the same conclusions about all other inscriptions considered to contain North Picene inscriptions.

== Corpus ==
The corpus of North Picene inscriptions consists of four engraved items of similar lettering and decoration, one of known archaeological provenance and the others acquired out of context but believed to be of the same location and date. The known site is the excavation at Servici Cemetery in Novilara, a village several kilometres south of Pesaro.

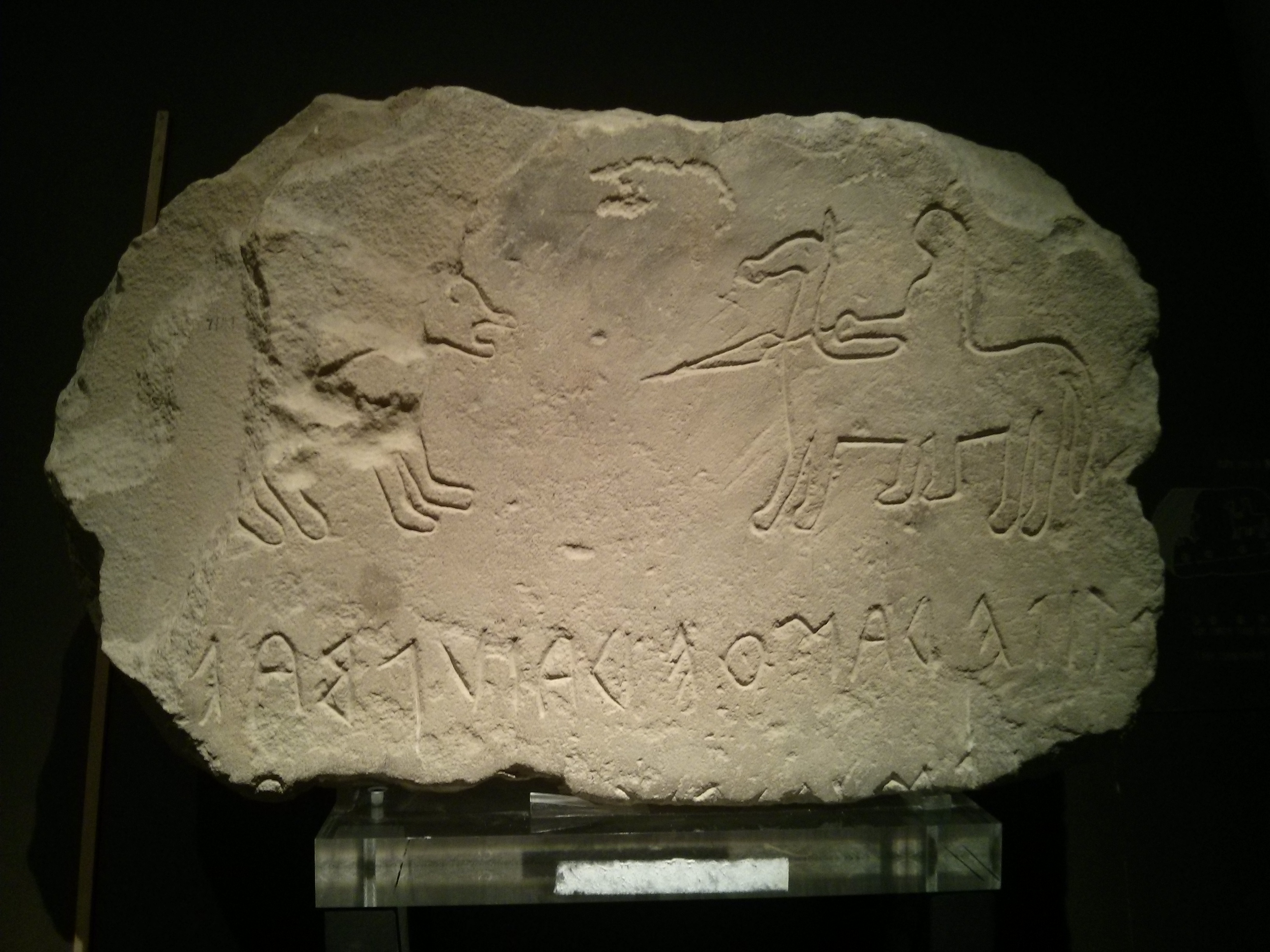
Stele from Novilara, Ancona - Museo Archeologico Nazionale delle Marche

All four items are stelae or fragments of stelae. Italian scholars have adopted the habit of calling them all Novilara Stelae. "The Novilara Stele" usually refers to the largest of the four. To the lettered stelae is added one without lettering but inscribed with the scene of a naval battle. It is kept in Pesaro, where it served as a model for a reconstructed Picene ship.

Novilara has been "excavated" since the mid-19th century. In those days the digging was not scientific, with no concern for stratigraphy. The locations of objects were not recorded. Apart from the fact that an object came from the site with other objects, no other information exists regarding it. Whether it was in situ or not in situ is of little concern. Even the date an object was excavated is now uncertain. Many objects are missing, as the region, the site and the museum have endured a century and a half of history, including war and occupation.

As the North Picene language is a unique case of such kind of language (it has no known relatives), and the origin of the inscriptions is not well established, showing also epigraphic divergences according to the dating assumed, there are authors considering that such stelae could be forgeries.

The fragment of most certain date (not very certain) is located in the Museo Oliveriano, Pesaro. One number associated with it is PID 344. It was excavated 1860, 1863 or 1895 from a tomb of the Servici Cemetery. It records two one-word lines, transcribed variously as ]lúpeś, ]mreceert or ]-UPE ś, ]Mresveat. The archaeological date is that of the site as a whole, somewhere in the window 800–650 BCE. The style of the alphabet suggests the end of the 7th and the beginning of the 6th centuries BCE. The most likely date, therefore, would be about 650 BCE, the end of the Novilara window. It was a time of Italic and Etruscan wars and warrior kings during the Roman Kingdom, as martial scenes on other stelae and the presence of weapons in nearly all graves of males suggest.

The only long inscription known to date is incised on a stone often called "the Novilara Stele". It is located in the Museo L. Pigorini, Rome, with the number PID 343. It begins mimniś erút ..... The decorations: spirals, wheel, herring bone and zig-zag patterns, are similar to those of the others. The reverse side features hunting and battle scenes. It and the nautical Novilara Stele were acquired out of context probably in 1889 in the vicinity of Novilara; they are generally believed to have been taken from there and to be of the same date.

== Sample text ==
Illustration of the Novilara stele

The best-known and longest North Picene inscription is on the stele from Novilara (now in the Museo Preistorico Pigorini, Rome), dated to approximately the 6th century BCE:

mimniś erút gaareśtadeś
rotnem úvlin partenúś
polem iśairon tet
śút tratneši krúviś
tenag trút ipiem rotneš
lútúiś θalú iśperion vúl
teś rotem teú aiten tašúr
śoter merpon kalatne
niś vilatoś paten arn
úiś baleśtenag andś et
šút iakút treten teletaú
nem polem tišú śotriś eúś

== Bibliography ==
- Belfiore, V., L. Sefano, N. Alessandro (2021) Novilara Stelae: a stylistic, epigraphical, and technological study in a middle Adriatic epigraphical and sculptural context. Bonn: Verlag Dr. Rudolf Habelt GmbH
- Davies, Glenys (1976). "Burial in Italy up to Augustus" (PDF). King's Manor, York: Archaeology Data Service (ads), the University of York. Archived from the original (PDF) on 2010-12-18.
- Agostiniani, Luciano (2003). "Le iscrizioni di Novilara". In I Piceni e l'Italia medio-adriatica. Atti del XXII Convegno di Studi Etruschi ed Italici (Ascoli Piceno, Teramo, Ancona, 9-13 aprile 2000), Pisa – Roma: Istituti Editoriali e Poligrafici Internazionali, pp. 115-125.
- Di Carlo, Pierpaolo (2007). L'enigma nord-piceno. Saggio sulla lingua delle stele di Novilara e sul loro contesto culturale, Padova : Unipress.
- Harkness, John (2011) "The Novilara Stele Revisited" Journal of Indo-European Studies vol. 39, pp. 13-35
- Poultney, James W. (1979) "The Language of the Northern Picene Inscriptions" Journal of Indo-European Studies vol. 7, pp. 49-64
