= Pontius =

Pontius may refer to:

== People from classical antiquity ==
- A member of the Pontia gens, a plebeian family (the article contains a longer list of members):
  - Gaius Pontius (fl. 321 BC), a Samnite commander during the Second Samnite War
  - Pontius Aquila (died 43 BC), Roman politician, military commander and one of Julius Caesar's assassins
  - Pontius Pilate (died after 39), Roman governor of Judaea who presided over the crucifixion of Jesus
  - Pontius Telesinus (died 82 BC), Samnite leader against the Roman Republic
  - Marcus Pontius Laelianus (fl. mid-2st century), Roman senator, governor, legion commander and consul
  - Pontius of Carthage (died c. 262), a deacon of the early church, and author of Life of Cyprian
  - Mericius Pontius Anicius Paulinus, birth name of Paulinus of Nola (c. 354–431), Roman poet, writer, senator, governor, consul and, as a convert to Christianity, saint and Bishop of Nola
- Pontius of Cimiez (died 257), early Christian martyr

== People in modern times ==
- Paulus Pontius (1603-1658), Flemish painter
- Chris Pontius (born 1974), actor in the Jackass television series
- Chris Pontius (soccer) (born 1987), American soccer player
- Mark Pontius (born 1985), member of the American indie rock band Foster the People
- Miller Pontius (1891–1960), American football player

== See also ==
- Ponce (surname)
- Pons (disambiguation)
- Pontia gens
