= Pontia gens =

Samnite and ancient Roman family

The gens Pontia was a plebeian family at ancient Rome. Few members of this gens rose to prominence in the time of the Republic, but the Pontii flourished under the Empire, eventually attaining the consulship. Pontius Pilatus, as prefect of Judaea, is known for his role in the execution of Jesus.

== Origin ==
The Pontii were of Samnite origin, and are first mentioned in connection with the Samnite Wars, after which some of them removed to Rome. Their nomen, Pontius, is a patronymic surname derived from the Oscan praenomen Pontus or Pomptus, cognate with the Latin praenomen Quintus. Thus, Pontius is the Samnite equivalent of the Roman gentes Quinctia and Quinctilia. Alternatively, it may be connected to the Latin word pons (bridge) and mean "bridge builder".

== Branches and cognomina ==
The only surname borne by the Pontii of the Republic is Aquila, an eagle. Various cognomina are found in imperial times.

== Members ==
This list includes abbreviated praenomina. For an explanation of this practice, see filiation.

- Pontius Cominius, a young soldier who volunteered to convey a message from the army to the senate, following the Battle of the Allia, when the Capitol was besieged by the Gauls. Floating down the river on some driftwood until he reached the Capitol, he asked that Marcus Furius Camillus, who was then in exile, be nominated dictator.
- Herennius Pontius, an aged resident of Caudium at the time of the Roman surrender in 321 BC, who advised the victorious Samnites either to release the Romans unharmed, or put them to the sword, concluding that imposing terms of peace on a conquered army would only lead the Romans to return seeking revenge.
- Gaius Pontius Herenni f., the Samnite leader who engineered the entrapment of a Roman army at the Caudine Forks in 321 BC. In Roman literary tradition, he imposed peace terms on the defeated army against his father's advice, and was later himself captured and beheaded by the Romans in revenge, but this is thought to be ahistorical.
- Pontius, a friend of Scipio Aemilianus.
- Pontius Telesinus, a Samnite leader during the Social War, and an opponent of Sulla during the Roman civil war of 82 BC. He attempted to raise Sulla's siege of Praeneste, but was defeated and killed at the Battle of the Colline Gate.
- Pontius Telesinus, younger brother of the Samnite leader, was besieged at Praeneste by Sulla. He attempted to arrange the escape of Marius the Younger, but finding their passage guarded, they fell by their own hands.
- Titus Pontius, a centurion mentioned by Cicero on account of his great strength. He may be the same person as the Pontius mentioned by Lucilius.
- Pontius Titinianus, a son of Quintus Titinius, who was adopted by one of the Pontii. Cicero asserts that he joined Caesar out of fear on the outbreak of the Civil War, which if correct would distinguish him from the soldier later captured by Scipio.
- Pontius, a soldier serving under Caesar, was captured by Metellus Scipio during the Civil War, and urged to go over to the side of Pompeius; but he stated that he would prefer death to betraying Caesar.
- Lucius Pontius, supported Caecilius, uncle of Pomponius Atticus, in a property dispute.
- Pontius Aquila, tribune of the plebs in 45 BC, annoyed Julius Caesar by not standing up during his triumphal procession, and afterwards became one of Caesar's assassins. He became a legate of fellow conspirator Decimus Brutus Albinus in Cisalpine Gaul, and was slain at the Battle of Mutina against the forces of Mark Antony.
- Lucius Pontius Aquila, a pontifex at Sutrium in an undetermined period. He may be identical with the assassin of Julius Caesar.
- Pontius, a companion of Marcus Antonius, whom Cicero excoriated in his Philippics.
- Pontius, punished with castration by Publius Cerennius, after the latter discovered him in the act of adultery with his wife.
- Pontius Aufidianus, learned that his daughter's tutor had allowed a certain Fannius Saturninus to deflower her, he put both the slave and his daughter to death.
- Pontius Lupus, a man of equestrian rank, who lost his eyesight, but continued as an advocate in the law courts.
- Pontius Pilatus, prefect of Judaea from AD 26 to 36, during the reign of Tiberius. He is today best known for the execution of Jesus.
- Pontius Fregellanus, a senator, deprived of his rank for aiding in the adulteries of Albucilla, in AD 36.
- Gaius Petronius Pontius Nigrinus, consul in AD 37, the year in which Tiberius died.
- Pontia Postumia, murdered by Octavius Sagitta, tribune of the plebs in AD 58, having broken off their engagement. Sagitta was banished to an island.
- Pontia, the daughter of Publius Petronius, poisoned her children, and opened her veins.
- Pontius Laelianus, mentioned in the testamentum Dasumii, perhaps the father of Marcus Pontius Laelianus, the consul of AD 145.
- Marcus Pontius Laelianus Larcius Sabinus, consul suffectus for the months of July and August, AD 145.
- Marcus Pontius (M. f.) Sabinus, consul in AD 153.
- Marcus Pontius M. f. Laelianus, consul in AD 163.
- Marcus Pontius (M. f. M. n.) Varanus Sabinus, perhaps the son of Marcus Pontius Sabinus, consul in AD 153.
- Pontius Proculus Pontianus, consul in AD 238.
- Pontius, a deacon of the early Church at Carthage, was the friend and companion of Cyprian. He authored a work on the life and martyrdom of Cyprian, which was much praised by Jerome, but it is not clear whether the Vita et Passione Sancti Cypriani that has survived is the original text.
- Mericius Pontius Anicius Paulinus, bishop of Nola from AD 409 until his death in 431. He authored a number of letters and some poems that are still extant, some lost religious tracts, and apparently the Passio Sancti Genesii, or "Passion of Saint Genesius".

== See also ==
- List of Roman gentes
- Pontic Greeks

== Bibliography ==
- Marcus Tullius Cicero, Cato Maior de Senectute, De Fato, De Finibus Bonorum et Malorum, De Officiis, Epistulae ad Atticum, Epistulae ad Familiares, Philippicae.
- Titus Livius (Livy), History of Rome.
- Marcus Velleius Paterculus, Compendium of Roman History.
- Valerius Maximus, Factorum ac Dictorum Memorabilium (Memorable Facts and Sayings).
- Flavius Josephus, Antiquitates Judaïcae (Antiquities of the Jews), Bellum Judaïcum (The Jewish War).
- Marcus Valerius Martialis (Martial), Epigrammata (Epigrams).
- Decimus Junius Juvenalis, Satirae (Satires).
- Publius Cornelius Tacitus, Annales, Historiae.
- Plutarchus, Lives of the Noble Greeks and Romans.
- Gaius Suetonius Tranquillus, De Vita Caesarum (Lives of the Caesars, or The Twelve Caesars).
- Appianus Alexandrinus (Appian), Bellum Samniticum (History of the Samnite War).
- Cassius Dio, Roman History.
- Eusebius of Caesarea, Historia Ecclesiastica.
- Ambrosius Theodosius Macrobius, Saturnalia.
- Joannes Zonaras, Epitome Historiarum (Epitome of History).
- Barthold Georg Niebuhr, The History of Rome, Julius Charles Hare and Connop Thirlwall, trans., John Smith, Cambridge (1828).
- Dictionary of Greek and Roman Biography and Mythology, William Smith, ed., Little, Brown and Company, Boston (1849).
- Realencyclopädie der classischen Altertumswissenschaft (RE or PW)
- George Davis Chase, "The Origin of Roman Praenomina", in Harvard Studies in Classical Philology, vol. VIII (1897).
- Wilhelm Drumann, Geschichte Roms in seinem Übergang von der republikanischen zur monarchischen Verfassung, oder: Pompeius, Caesar, Cicero und ihre Zeitgenossen, volume 3 (2nd edition), ed. Paul Groebe (Leipzig, 1906).
- Alan E. Samuel, Greek and Roman Chronology: Calendars and Years in Classical Antiquity, C. H. Beck, Munich (1972).
- Géza Alföldy, Konsulat und Senatorenstand unter der Antonien (The Consulate and Senatorial State under the Antonines), Rudolf Habelt, Bonn (1977).
- Olli Salomies, Adoptive and Polyonymous Nomenclature in the Roman Empire, Societas Scientiarum Fennica, Helsinki (1992).
- Oxford Classical Dictionary (4th ed.), ISBN 978-0-19-954556-8.
- Werner Eck, "Die Fasti consulares der Regierungszeit des Antoninus Pius, eine Bestandsaufnahme seit Géza Alföldys Konsulat und Senatorenstand" (The Consular Fasti for the Reign of Antoninus Pius: an Inventory since Géza Alföldy's Konsulat und Senatorenstand), in Studia Epigraphica in Memoriam Géza Alföldy, Werner Eck, Bence Fehér, Péter Kovács, eds., Bonn, pp. 69–90 (2013).
- Demandt, Alexander (2012). Pontius Pilatus. Munich: C. H. Beck. ISBN 9783406633621.
