= Pontius Aquila =

Assassin of Julius Caesar

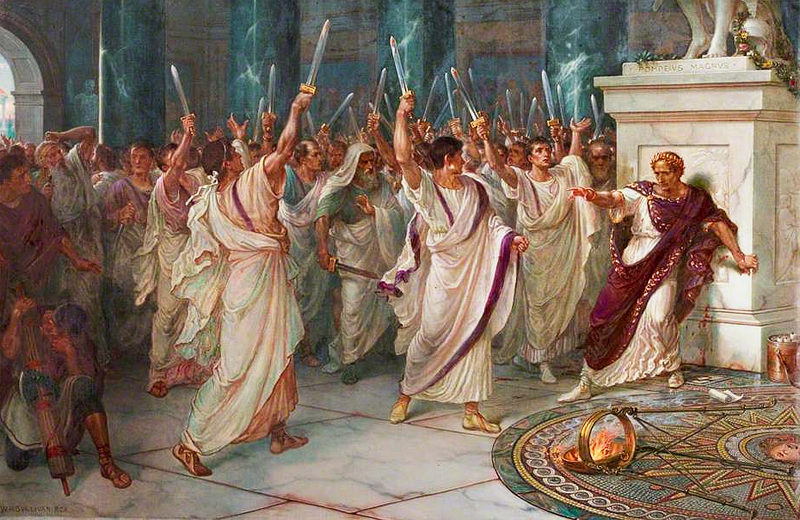
The assassination of Julius Caesar, painted by William Holmes Sullivan, c. 1888

Pontius Aquila (possibly Lucius Pontius; died 21 April 43 BC) was a Roman politician, military commander, and one of the assassins of Julius Caesar. In 45 BC, as tribune of the plebs, he annoyed Caesar by refusing to stand during his triumphal procession, and, in the following year, joined the conspiracy to kill the dictator. Aquila died fighting at the Second Battle of Mutina against Mark Antony in April 43 BC, before the formation of the Second Triumvirate later that year.

== Life ==
Pontius Aquila probably belonged to an undistinguished family from Sutrium in southern Etruria. He seems to have been a committed republican and opponent of Julius Caesar from the start, and probably supported Caesar's enemy Pompey in the civil war which began in 49 BC. In 45 BC, during Caesar's dictatorship, he was tribune of the plebs, and at Caesar's triumph in October, Aquila did not, unlike the other tribunes, stand up in honor as the procession passed by. This irritated Caesar so much, he cried out, "come then, Aquila, take back the republic from me, tribune", and for several days he would not make a public promise to anyone without vindictively adding, "that is, if Pontius Aquila will allow me". This taunt probably resulted in a feud between the two, as Pontius became one of Caesar's assassins.

After the Ides of March, he became a deputy (legatus) of the governor of Cisalpine Gaul, Decimus Brutus, another of the assassins. When the rebel Mark Antony marched against Decimus in 43 BC and besieged him at Mutina, Aquila did not remain holed up with Decimus in the city, but instead went out on the field, recruited troops and gathered equipment from his own pocket, and conducted operations independently. In late January, he took the town of Claternae jointly with the consul Aulus Hirtius, and then proceeded to Pollentia, where he defeated Antony's subordinate, Titus Munatius Plancus Bursa, in battle. Aquila joined Hirtius again outside Mutina to break Antony's siege of Decimus at Mutina. In the ensuing battle, the republicans were victorious, but both Hirtius and Aquila were killed. At the request of Cicero, the Senate honored Aquila with a statue and reimbursed his heirs with the costs he had personally incurred during the war. Münzer commented that, of Caesar's known assassins, Aquila met the most honorable end.

It has been suggested that Aquila be identified with the Pontius whose property near Neapolis was, according to Cicero, confiscated by Caesar, which would have given Aquila an additional motive to conspire against the dictator aside from political convictions. Münzer was sceptical, however, since Cicero generally referred to Aquila by his surname. Zvi Yavetz has also suggested that Caesar's triumph over fellow Romans in a civil war might also been a factor in Aquila's refusal to salute the Roman leader. Evans noted that "Pontius" is a name of Samnite origin, and conjectured that Caesar's rule might have reminded Aquila of Sulla's reign, in which Samnites had been ruthlessly treated.

Aquila may have been an ancestor of Pontius Pilate, a 1st-century prefect of Judaea who is known for putting Jesus of Nazareth to death.
