= Samnites =

Italic people living in Samnium in south-central Italy

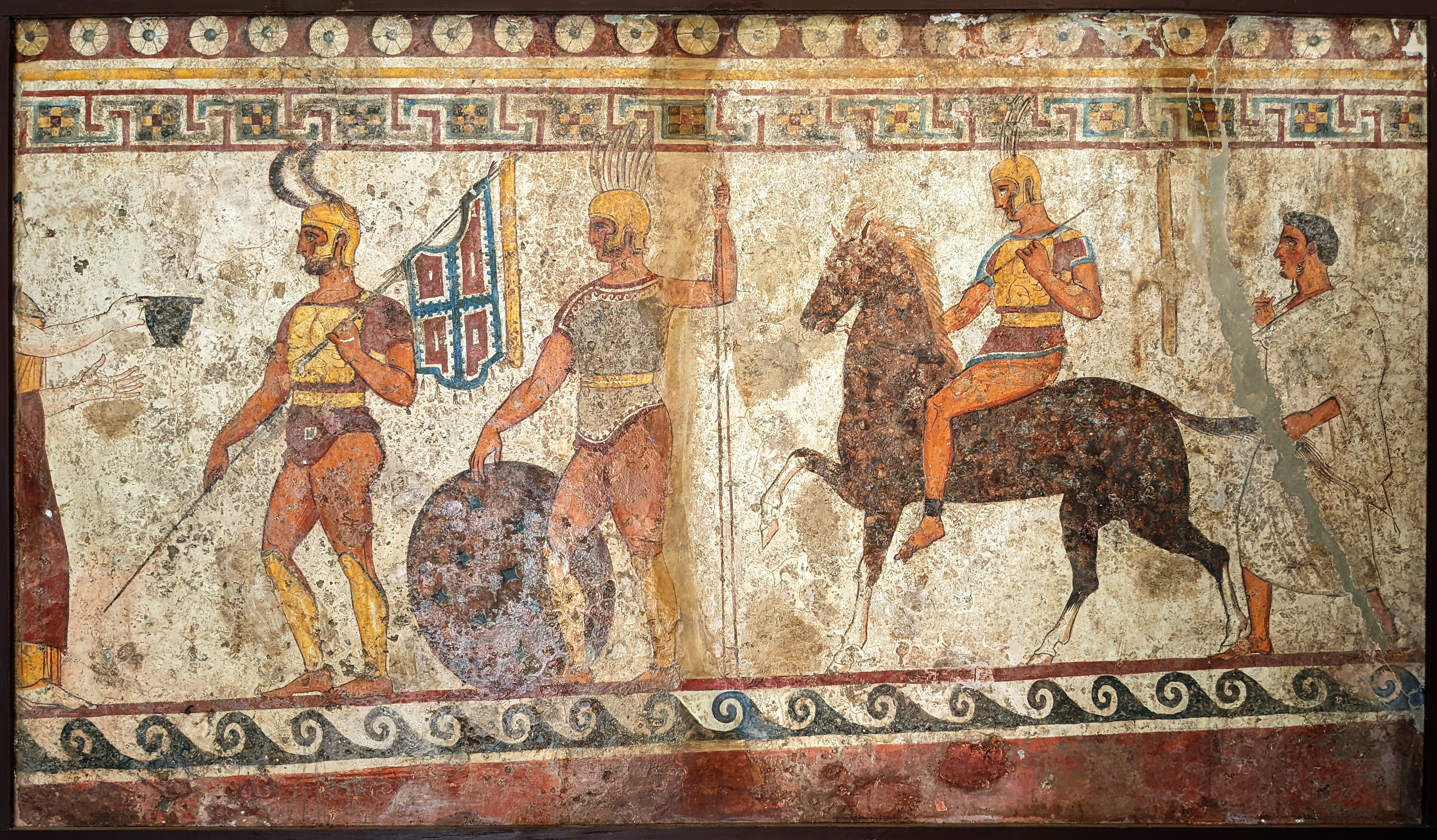
Samnite soldiers depicted on a tomb frieze in Nola. From the 4th century BC

The Samnites (Oscan: Safineis) were an ancient Italic people who inhabited Samnium, a region located in the modern inland Abruzzo, Molise, and Campania in south-central Italy.

Italy in 400 BC Samnites

An Oscan-speaking people, who originated as an offshoot of the Sabines, they formed a confederation consisting of four tribes: the Hirpini, Caudini, Caraceni, and Pentri. Ancient Greek historians considered the Umbri as the ancestors of the Samnites. Their migration was in a southward direction, according to the rite of ver sacrum.

Although allied together against the Gauls in 354 BC, they later became enemies of the Romans and fought them in a series of three wars. Despite an overwhelming victory at the Battle of the Caudine Forks (321 BC), the Samnites were subjugated in 290 BC. Although severely weakened, the Samnites would still side against the Romans, first in the Pyrrhic War and then with Hannibal in the Second Punic War. They also fought in the Social War and later in Sulla's civil war as allies of the Roman consuls Papirius Carbo and Gaius Marius against Sulla, who defeated them and their leader Pontius Telesinus at the Battle of the Colline Gate (82 BC). Afterwards they were assimilated by the Romans and ceased to exist as a distinct people.

The Samnites had an economy focused upon livestock and agriculture. Samnite agriculture was highly advanced for its time, and they practiced transhumance. Aside from relying on agriculture, the Samnites exported goods such as ceramics, bronze, iron, olives, wool, pottery, and terracottas. Their trade networks extended across Campania, Latium, Apulia, and Magna Graecia.

Samnite society was stratified into cantons. Each city was a vicus. Many vici were grouped into a pagus, and many pagi were grouped into a touto. There were four Samnite touto, one for each of the Samnite tribes. Aside from this system of government, a few Samnite cities had political entities similar to a senate. It was rare, although possible, for the Samnites to unify under a coalition; normally the tribes and cities functioned independently from one another.

Samnite religion worshipped both spirits called numina and gods and goddesses. The Samnites honored their gods by sacrificing live animals and using votive offerings. Superstition was prominent in the Samnite religion. It was believed that magical chants could influence reality, that magical amulets could protect people, and that augurs could see the future. Samnite priests would manage religious festivals and they could bind people to oaths. Sanctuaries were a major part of the Samnite religion. These might have been used to benefit from trade networks, may have marked the border between territories, and may have been intertwined with government. Samnite sanctuaries may have also been used to reinforce group identity.

== Etymology ==
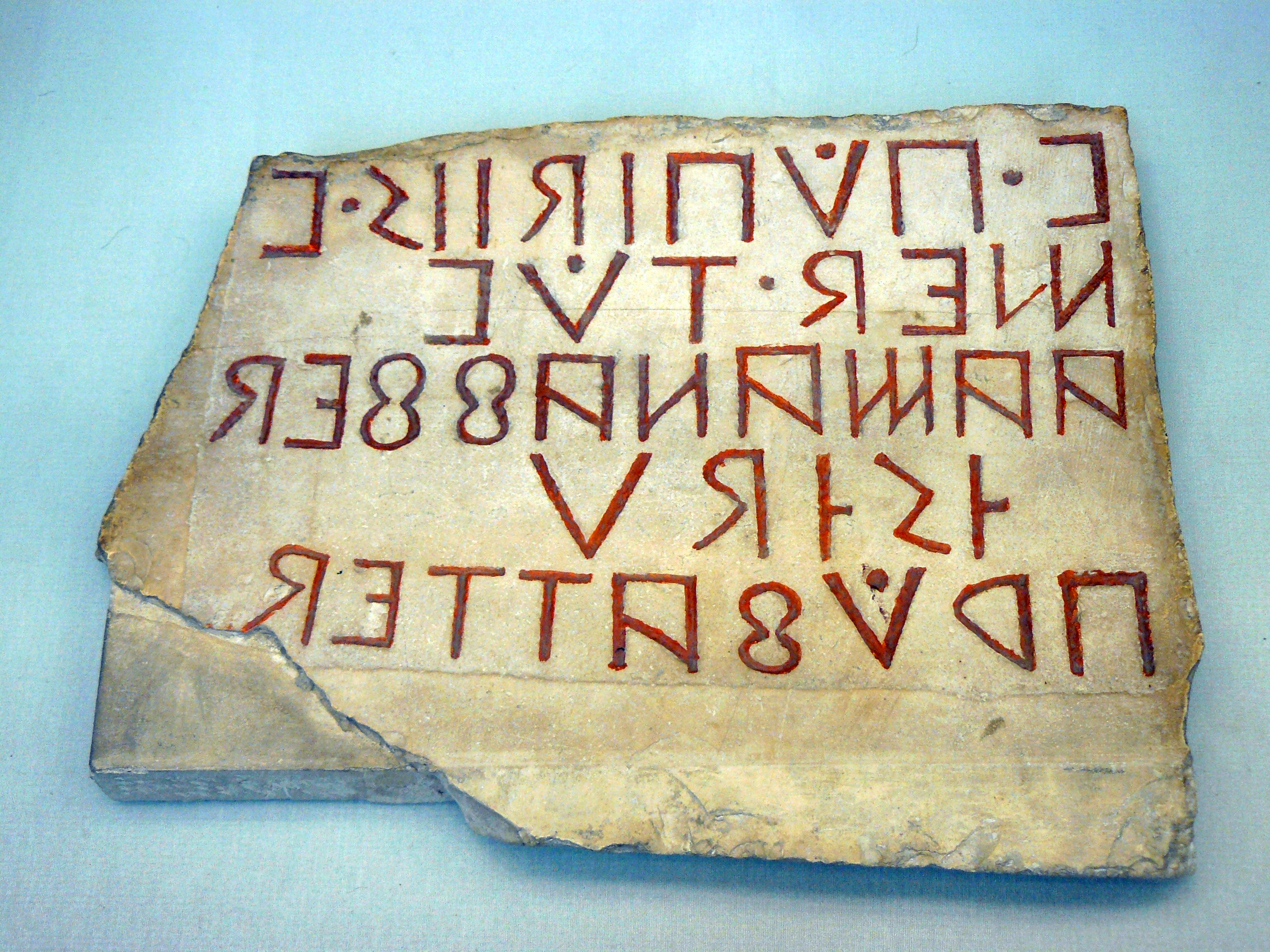
Oscan inscription. From right to left it reads: "V[ibius] Popidius, son of V[ibius], chief magistrate, was responsible for this work and approved it."

The Indo-European root Saβeno or Sabh evolved into the word Safen, which later became Safin. The word Safin may have been the first term used to describe the Samnite people and the Samnite Kingdom. Etymologically, this name is generally recognized to be a form of the name of the Sabines, who were Umbrians. From Safinim, Sabinus, Sabellus and Samnis, an Indo-European root can be extracted, *sabh-, which becomes Sab- in Latino-Faliscan and Saf- in Osco-Umbrian: Sabini and *Safineis. Some archaeologists believe Safin refers to all the people of the Italian peninsula, others say just the people of Molise. It could also be an adjective used to describe a group of people. It appears on graves near Abruzzo from the 5th century, as well as Oscan inscriptions and slabs in Penna Sant'Andrea. The last known usage of the word is on a coin from the Social War.

Safin would go through a series of changes culminating in Safinim, the Oscan word for Samnium, meaning "cult place of the Safin people." This became the word for the Samnite people, Safineis. as well as other words in Greek such as Saini, Saineis, Samnītēs, Sabellī, and Saunìtai. These terms likely originated in the 5th century BC and derive from saunion, the Greek word for javelin.

At some point in prehistory, a population speaking a common language extended over both Samnium and Umbria. Salmon conjectures that it was common Italic and puts forward a date of 600 BC, after which the common language began to separate into dialects. This date does not necessarily correspond to any historical or archaeological evidence; developing a synthetic view of the ethnology of proto-historic Italy is an incomplete and ongoing task.

Linguist Julius Pokorny carries the etymology somewhat further back. Conjecturing that the -a- was altered from an -o- during some prehistoric residence in Illyria, he derives the names from an o-grade extension *swo-bho- of an extended e-grade *swe-bho- of the possessive adjective, *s(e)we-, of the reflexive pronoun, *se-, "oneself" (the source of English self). The result is a set of Indo-European tribal names (if not the endonym of the Indo-Europeans): Germanic Suebi and Semnones, Suiones as well as Swedes; Celtic Senones; Slavic Serbs and Sorbs; Italic Sabelli, Sabini, etc., as well as a large number of kinship terms.

== History ==
=== Origins and early history ===
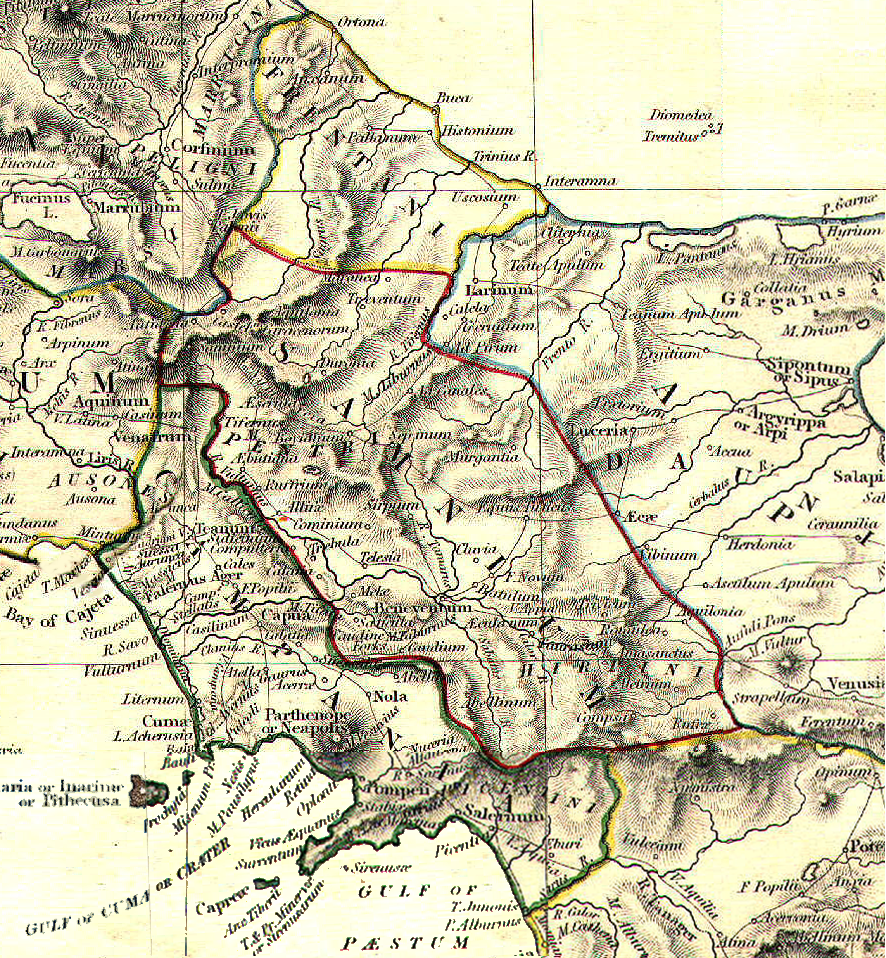
Samnium in the Historical Atlas, by William R. Shepherd (1911)

The Greek geographer Strabo wrote that the Samnite civilization originated from a group of Sabine exiles. According to this account, during either a famine, or as part of an attempt to end a war with the Umbrians, the Sabines vowed to hold a Ver Sacrum. As part of this ritual, all things produced that year were sacrificed, including babies. Once these babies had reached adulthood they were exiled, and then guided by a bull to their new homeland. Upon reaching this land they sacrificed this bull to Mars. Other Samnite tribes claimed to have been guided by different animals. The Hirpini claimed they were guided by a wolf, and the Picentes claimed to have been guided by a woodpecker. Alternatively, the Samnites may have been connected to Sparta, though this legend is possibly apocryphal. It might have been created by the Greeks for an alliance with the Samnites, or to include the Italic peoples within their worldview, and possibly to highlight similarities between the Samnites and Spartans. Archaeological evidence shows that Samnite civilization likely developed from a preexisting Italian culture.

After the Etruscans abandoned Campania in the 5th century BC, the Samnites conquered the region. Cities like Pompeii and Herculaneum were conquered. It is unclear what Samnite cities took part in the campaign, or why. They could have wanted its fertile soil, or to alleviate overpopulation. This theory relies on the Samnites having a poor agricultural industry, which is contradicted by other evidence. Alternatively, the Samnites could have wanted access to the Volturno River and other resources. Once Greek hegemony in Italy waned, the Samnites invaded and conquered much of their former land. They conquered cities like Cumae, only failing to take Naples. In the ensuing centuries, they would wage more war against the Campanians, Volscians, Epirot Greeks, and other Latin communities.

=== Samnite Wars ===
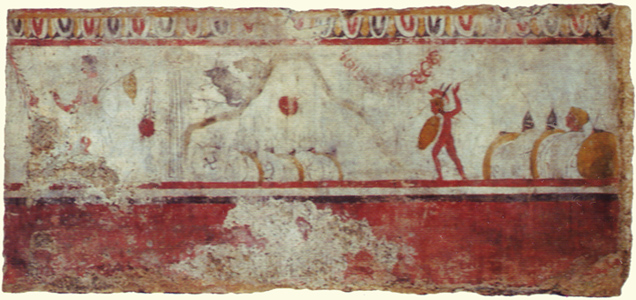
Lucanian depiction of the Battle of Caudine Forks

The Samnites and Romans first came into contact after the Roman conquest of the Volscians. In 354 BC, they agreed to set their border at the Liris River. Livy, a Roman historian who serves as a source on the Samnite Wars, states that when the Samnites attacked the Campanians, the latter civilization formed an alliance with the Romans, igniting war between them and the Samnites in 343 BC. This account of the war's cause is not universally accepted by modern historians. Livy may be writing propaganda or trying to compare this war to other conflicts. After three Samnite defeats and a Roman invasion, the Samnites agreed to sign a peace treaty.

There are two accounts of the cause of the Second Samnite War. Possibly, Rome declared war due to a Samnite alliance with the Vestini and wars against Fregellae and Paleopolis. Additionally, the Romans wished to use the economic prosperity of the city of Venafrum for their own benefit. Conflict may have also emerged because the Samnites desired to solidify their hold over crucial economic positions. After the Roman defeat at the Battle of the Caudine Forks both sides agreed to an armistice. Fighting resumed in 326 BC. The war ended after a Roman campaign into Apulia and Samnium. Following the end of the war, the Romans annexed Bovianum and Fregellae, and forced the Samnites out of Apulia.

In 298 BC, the Third Samnite War broke out due to tension over the Lucanians, who had asked Rome for protection. On another front, treaties between the Romans and Picentes caused conflict with the Etruscans. This war came to end after the Samnite defeat at the Battle of Aquilonia. Afterwards, Samnium was conquered and the Samnites were assimilated into Roman society.

=== Later history ===
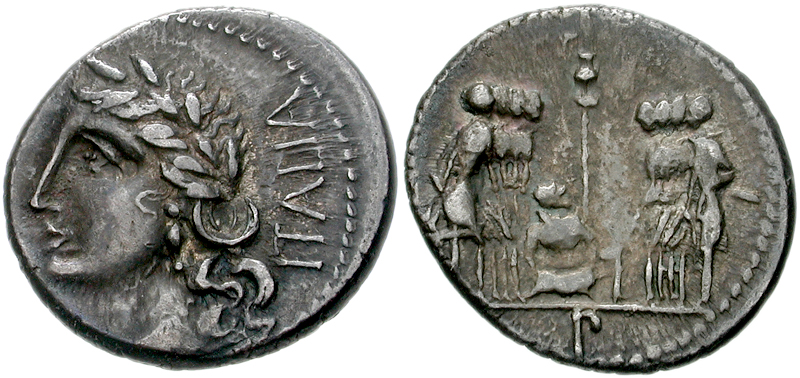
Social War coin depicting the Samnite soldiers taking an oath to fight the Romans

The Samnites were one of the Italian peoples that allied with King Pyrrhus of Epirus during the Pyrrhic War. After Pyrrhus left for Sicily, the Romans invaded Samnium and were crushed at the Battle of the Cranita Hills, but after the defeat of Pyrrhus, the Samnites could not resist on their own and surrendered to Rome. Some of them joined and aided Hannibal during the Second Punic War, but most stayed loyal to Rome. After the Romans refused to grant the Samnites citizenship, they, along with other Italic peoples, rebelled against the Romans. This war, known as the Social War, lasted almost four years and resulted in a Roman victory. After this bloody conflict, Samnites and other Italic tribes were granted citizenship to avoid the possibility of another war.

The Samnites supported the faction of Marius and Carbo in the civil war against Sulla. The Samnites and their allies were led by Pontius Telesinus and a Lucanian named Marcus Lamponius. They gathered an army of 40,000 men and fought a battle against Sulla at the Colline Gates. After their defeat in the battle, and subsequently the war, Pontius was executed.

As a consequence of Sulla's victory and his establishment as dictator of Rome he ordered the punishment of those who had opposed him. Samnites, who were some of the most prominent supporters of the Marians, were punished so severely that it was recorded: "some of their cities have now dwindled into villages, some indeed being entirely deserted." The Samnites did not play any prominent role in history after this, and they were Latinized and assimilated into the Roman world. Several of their gentes would go on to achieve high distinction, including the Cassii, the Herennii, Pontii and the Vibii.

== Society ==
=== Economy ===
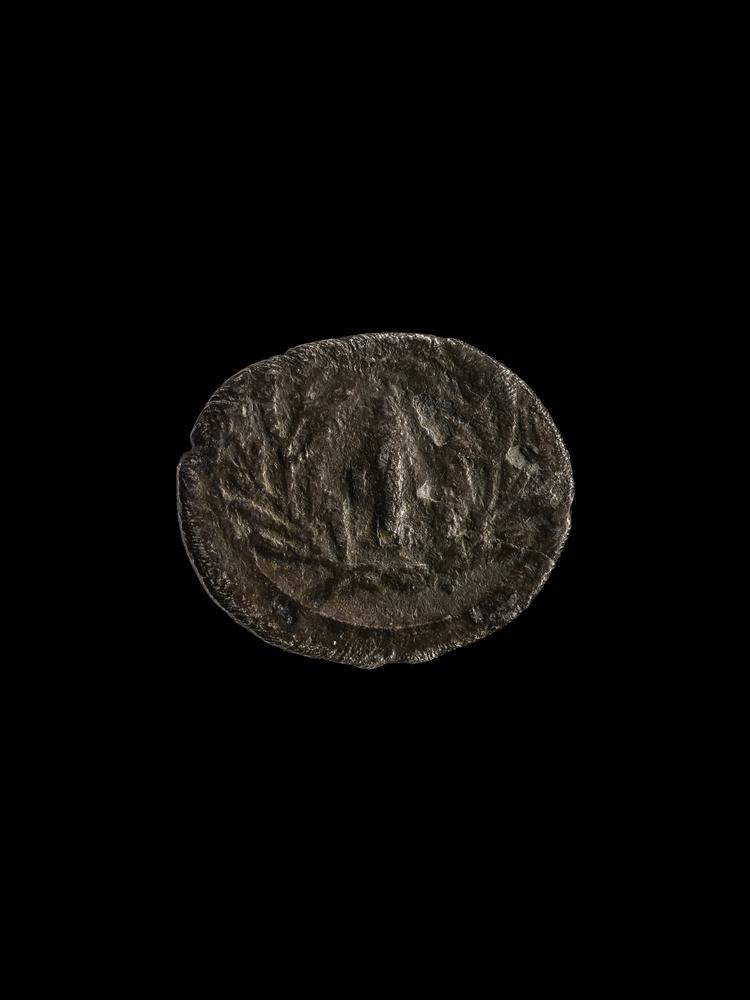
Samnite coin depicting a javelin head with a laurel wreath

Most of Samnium consisted of rugged and mountainous terrain lacking in natural resources. This resulted in a mixed economy focused on using the small amounts of fertile land to practice highly developed forms of subsistence agriculture, mixed farming, animal husbandry, sheep farming, pastoralism, and smallholdings. The prosperity of the Samnite agricultural industry likely resulted in conflicts between them and other civilizations, and possibly one of the causes of the Samnite Wars.

The prominence of pastoralism and livestock in the Samnite economy was also a consequence of their homeland's terrain. Horses, poultry, cattle, goats, pigs, and sheep were all common and important kinds of livestock. These animals were valued because they could serve as a tradeable good, and as a source of food. Transhumance, or the seasonal movement of livestock from summer to winter pastures, was an important aspect of the Samnite economy. Annual short distance transhumance formed the basis of the aristocracy's wealth. Long distance transhumance was practiced between Apulia and Samnium.

During the fifth and fourth centuries BC, an increasing population combined with trade links to other Italians contributed to further agricultural and urban development. This change was most drastic in Larinum. The city began as a major grain producer with a mill and a threshing floor, and later developed into the hub for all economic activity in the Biferno Valley. The Samnites exported goods such as cereals, cabbages, olives, olive oil, wine, bronze, iron, textiles, legumes, and vines. They also imported materials such as bronze bowls and bucchero from places like Campania, Etruria, Latium, Apulia, and Magna Graecia. These trade networks resulted in the adoption of products and ideas from other cultures such as the Sabines, Latins, and Etruscans.

Samnite currency developed in the late fifth and early fourth centuries BC, likely as a consequence of interaction with the Greeks, and war, which created a need for mercenaries. Their bronze or silver currency might have been produced in Naples, and then "ordered" from the city's workshops. Alternatively, Samnite cities might have supplied the materials necessary for making currency. Or coins could have been imported from cities that Samnite mercenaries worked for. Such as Taranto. Currency at this time generally depicted places like Allifae, Nola, Philistia, or peoples such as the Campani. These images are associated with the development of the Samnite political structure. Coins may have not been used by individuals, but instead by government institutions to finance administrative tasks. Following this early period of high currency production, the Samnites began to mint less money.

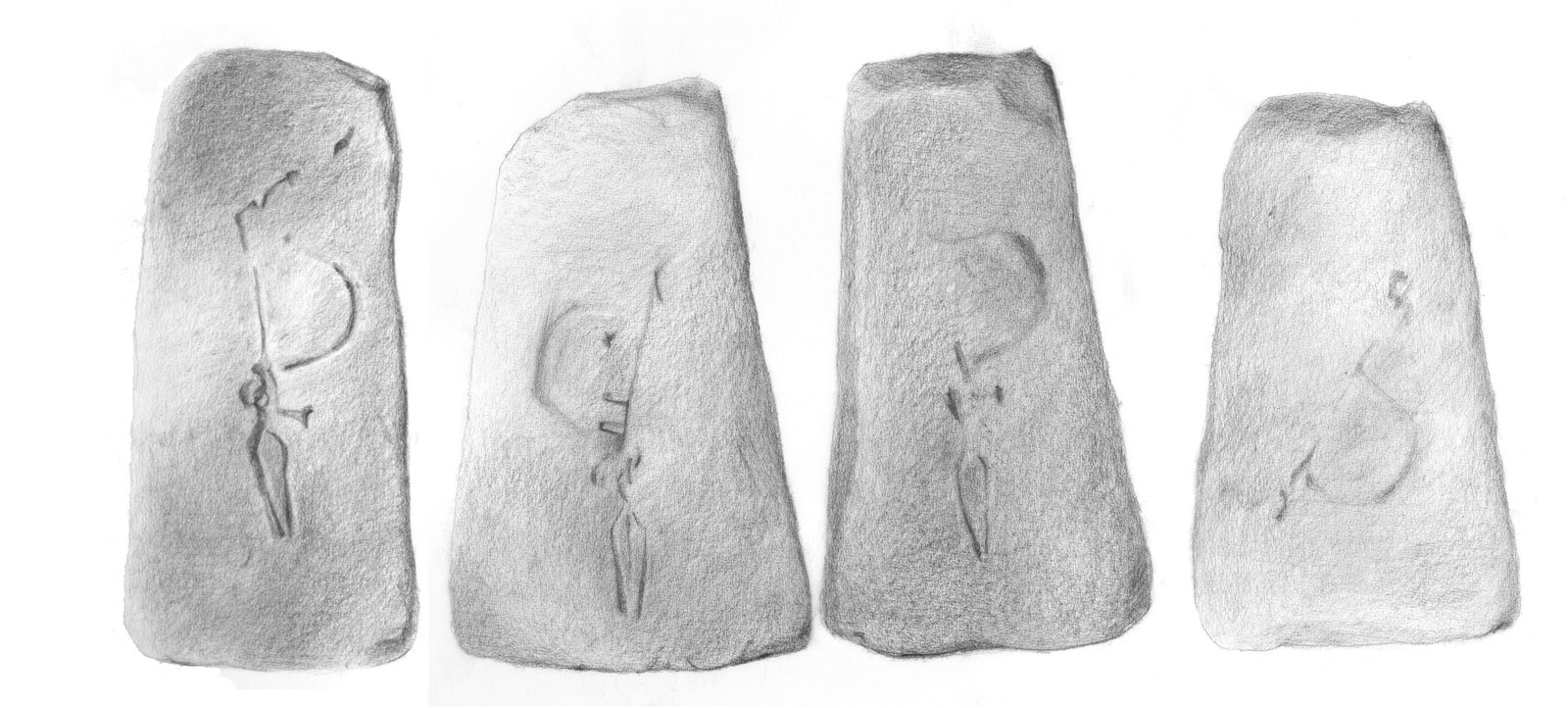
Samnite loom weight with a design of fibulas and tweezers

Wool and leather were likely harvested by the Samnites in significant quantities, as evidenced by the numerous loom weights found throughout Samnium. Most loom weights used incised lines, dots, oval stamps, gem impressions, or imprints from metal signet rings to create patterns. Common patterns included pyramids, stars, or dotted or incised cross motifs. Motifs could have been shaped like leaves, flowers, pomegranates, or mythological figures. One loom weight from the town of Locri is decorated with a gem impression of a satyr playing the lyre. Numerous pieces of Samnite pottery with Greek words incised into them have been found. These Greek words may have served a variety of possibilities, such as instructing the weaver how to order the threads in the textile patterns, or they could also have marked the piece's quality. The Greek inscriptions may also have stated the weight of either the loom weight or the cloth, and possibly the cloth's dimensions.

The Samnites also produced amphorae, terracottas, and impasto pottery with black gloss. Protective coating, also called varnish, was used to cover pottery and amphorae. Most amphorae came from Rhodes, and pottery was commonly purchased from Greece. Pottery was also rarely imported from North Africa or areas by the Adriatic. After the urbanization of Samnite society, the production of Hellenistic or Italian pottery dramatically increased. Ceramics, pottery, and amphorae often used patterns. The majority of these patterns were trademarks or signatures from the craftsmen. On other occasions, they depicted places such as the island of Rhodes, or named government officials., such as the Meddíss Túvtíks. One example of a pottery stamp is:

Detfri (slave) of Herennis Sattis signed in planta pedis.

— Impressed on a tile in Pietrabbondante in the Second Century BC.

=== Government ===
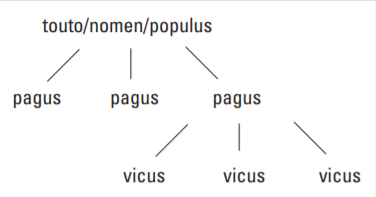
A depiction of the Samnite Pagus-vicus system

Throughout the Iron Age Samnium was ruled by chieftains and aristocrats who used funerary displays to flaunt their wealth. During the early third and fourth centuries, the Samnite political system developed into an organization focused on rural settlements led by magistrates. The Samnite settlements, or vici, were at the bottom of the Samnite social hierarchy. They were grouped into cantons called pagi, which were run by an elected official known as a meddiss. The pagi were organized into toutos, which were the Samnite tribes. Each touto was led by an annually elected official with supreme executive and judicial powers called the meddíss túvtiks (Latin: meddix tuticus).

Political entities similar to councils, assemblies, or senates such as the kombennio possibly existed. The Kombennio was a democratic organization in Pompeii responsible for electing officials, as well as making laws and enforcing them. Senates were located at the capitals of the Samnite tribes, such as Bovianum, the Pentrian capital. It is unclear if these forms of government existed before the Roman conquest. Despite these democratic institutions, Samnite society was still dominated by a small group of aristocratic families such as the Papii, Statii, Egnatii, and Staii. Each Samnite tribe functioned independently from the others. However, a union similar to the Latin League would occasionally form between the tribes. Such an alliance would be primarily militaristic, with a commander and chief enforcing all laws enacted by the alliance. In order for the alliance to pass legislation, leading men of each tribe would have to unanimously agree before a bill could become a law. Such an alliance was rare, and even if some tribes unified others might refuse to unite with the other tribes. The Frentani was another Italic tribe that might have been included in this alliance, however, their importance to the union might be exaggerated. The relevance of the Samnite tribes in this organization might also be exaggerated; cities could have had more political power.

This system of government maintained itself after the Roman conquest of Samnium albeit with some reductions in power. The touto and pagus began to function as miniature Republics, while the vicus remained unchanged. The only interference from the Romans would be that the Municipum held authority over all previous institutions and could override them, while the prefectures had little authority over the Samnites.

=== Military ===
Roman historians believed that Samnite society was highly militaristic. They feared Samnite cavalry and infantry, and nicknamed them Belliger Samnis, which translates to "Warrior Samnites". It is unclear if this portrayal is accurate as most Roman historical accounts of the Samnites were written after this civilization had disappeared. Much of this work could also be propaganda. In the early periods of Samnite history, the military consisted of trained warriors led by local leaders. Access to the military (and military equipment) was dependent on one's wealth and status, while poorer and lower status individuals were relegated to work such as agriculture. Samnite soldiers would have been trained in the triangular forum in Pompeii from an early age as part of a group known as the Vereiia. The Vereiia evolved into a community service group after the Roman conquest. During the Samnite Wars, the army evolved to resemble the armies of Ancient Greek city states. This new system used phalanxes, hoplites, maniples, and cohorts made of 400 men, creating an army flexible enough to fight in mountainous terrain. Low class soldiers began to be conscripted into the army, increasing its size to several thousand soldiers, although these recruits were less skilled and poorly trained.

Livy mentions a legio linteata ("linen legion"); this unit used flamboyant equipment to differentiate itself from other Samnite warriors. According to Livy, this legion took an oath to never flee battle inside a linen structure. Scholars believe that this description was designed to highlight the differences between the "civilized" Romans, and the barbaric enemies of Rome. Livy also could have been attempting to try and convey Samnite historical and religious power through a single unit. Due to corroborating archaeological evidence, other scholars state that it would be "rash" to completely dismiss this entire story.

==== Armor ====
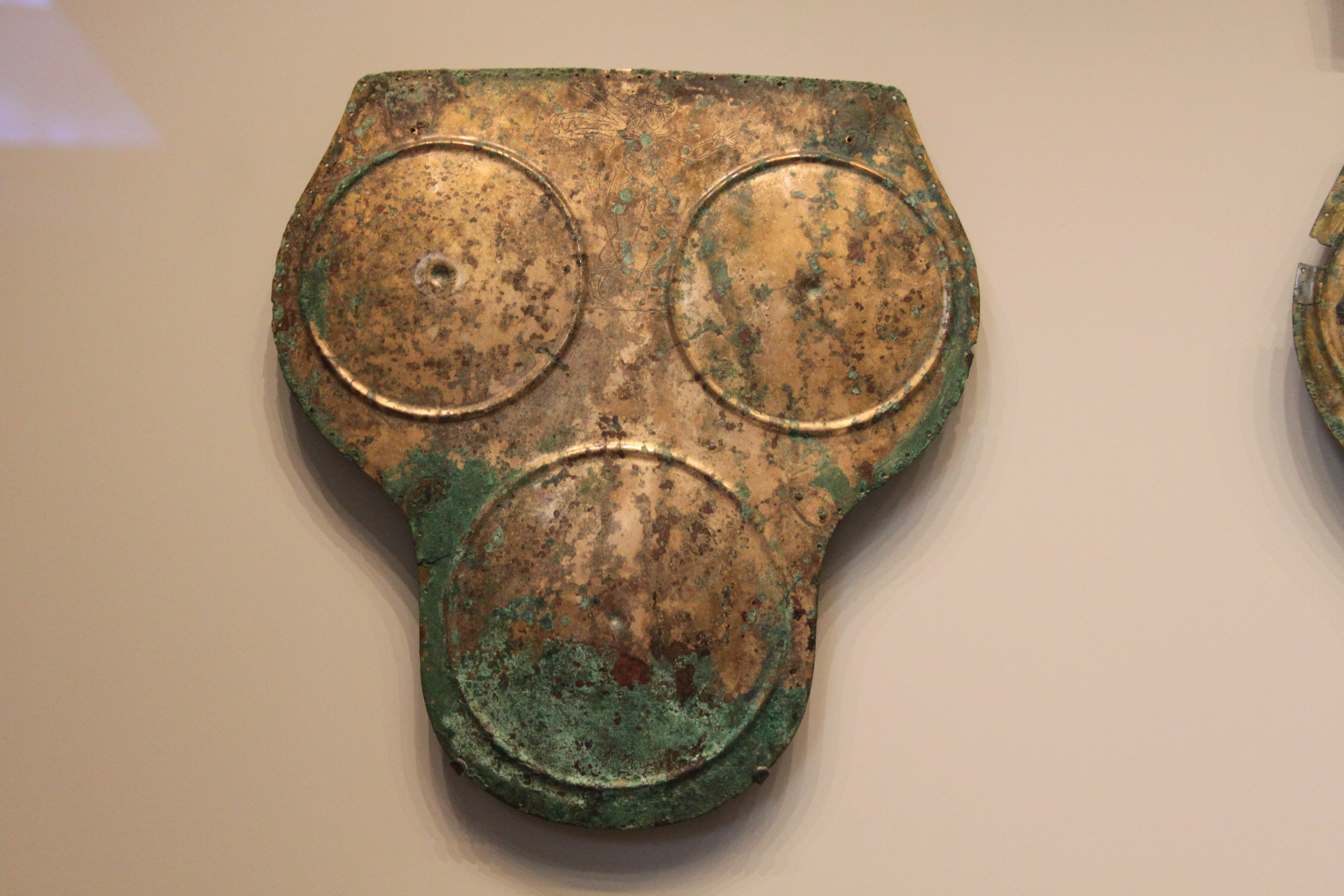
Bronze Samnite cuirass. This piece is from 400 to 300 BC in Southern Italy

Samnite soldiers wore a small single disc breastplate. This breastplate, called the kardiophylax consisted of straps that passed around the shoulders, chest, and back, and attached around points. Although the triple-disc cuirass offered more protection, this armor continued to be used as a status symbol. There were three types of triple-disc cuirasses. The first used bronze to fill the space between the three identical discs. Small rings were attached to this bronze, and side straps were used to hold the armor together. Shoulder straps were also fastened to these small rings. The second type utilized an edge to outline the discs, while the third used plates to depict the heads of religious figures such as Athena or demons. All three types were constructed by placing a disc below and between two upper discs forming a triangular shape.

Broad belts made of leather, gold, or bronze were common pieces of armor, and significant to Samnite culture. They were likely dedicated to protecting the abdomen. Samnite belts were made by heating up tin alloys at 800 degrees Celsius. Afterward, work would be performed on the belt at a temperature ranging from 600 to 800 degrees Celsius. Hammers and abrasives were used to grind the strips, giving them the appearance of silver. When making the belts, a thermal treatment was used in repeated cycles to increase the durability of the material.

Samnite helmets were based on Greek military equipment—they used cheek guards, crests, and plumes. Crests were usually made by fastening horse tails to a metal piece that hung at the back of the helmet. Rivets could also be used to pin crests to the helmet's peak. Another type of crest was thin and bushy with long free-flowing ends. Feathers and horns were a common feature of Samnite crests and plumes. Soldiers would don their greaves by resting their leg on a rock whilst using their hands to test the fit of the equipment. This piece of equipment reached down to the ankle and was likely custom-made to fit the owner. There are few depictions of Samnite soldiers wearing graves, implying that they were rarely used outside of rituals and "mock-fights."

==== Weaponry ====
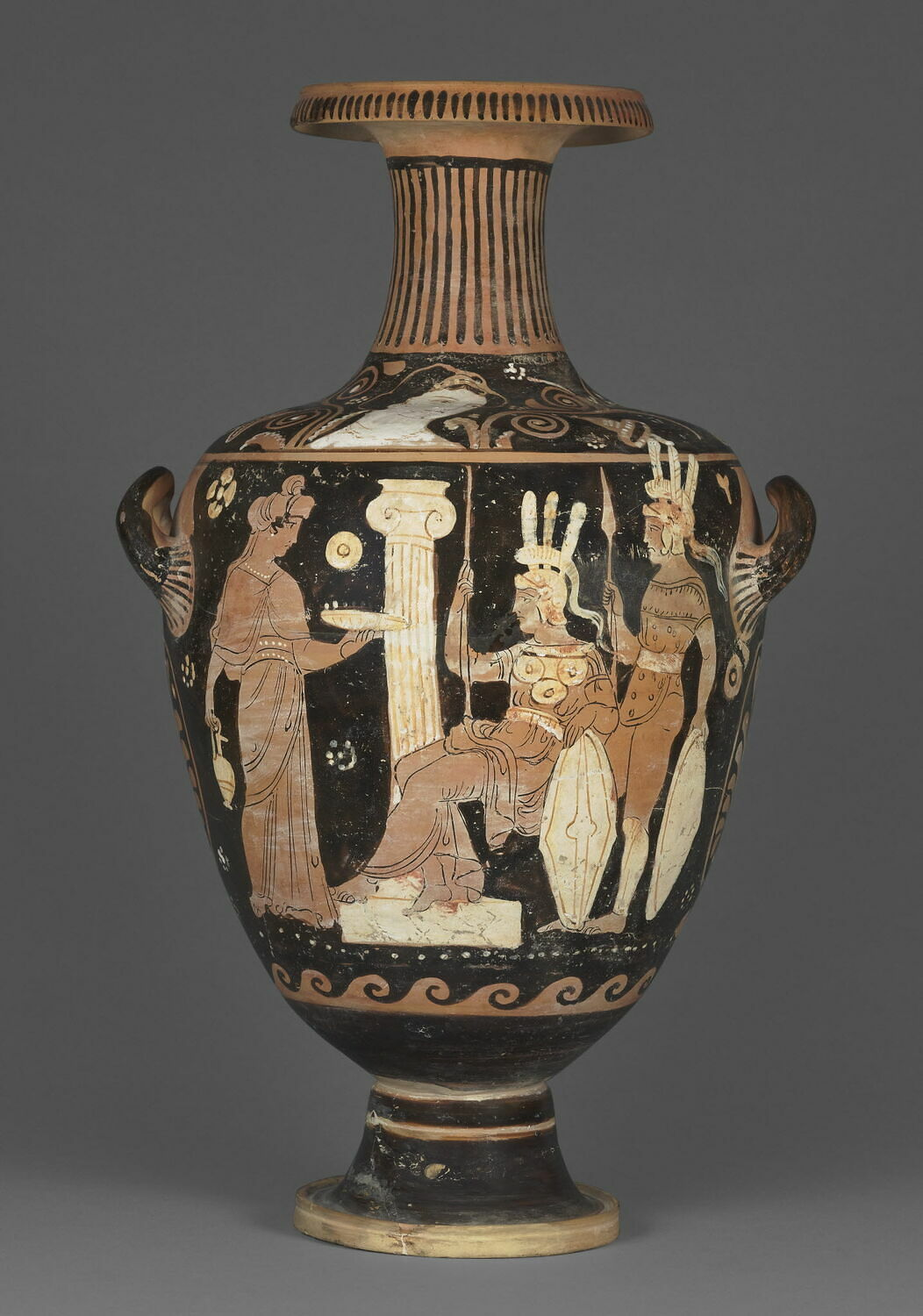
Pottery depicting a Samnite warrior

Projectiles such as spears and javelins were commonly used by the Samnites. Spearheads were made from two bronze or iron parts. The upper part was the spearhead proper, and a lower part, which used a tube to hold up the end of a wooden shaft. To fasten the shaft to the spearhead, nails were driven through a hole in the shaft. Tubes were used to fit the spear into a bronze chape, which would protect the wooden shaft. Projectile weaponry was so essential to Samnite tactics that if a soldier ran out of projectiles, they would throw rocks off the ground.

Alongside spears, soldiers would use swords or even hand-to-hand combat. Depictions on pottery, and figurines such as the Capestrano Warrior showcase Samnite soldiers using a kind of Bronze Age sword called an antenna sword. Another kind of sword associated with the Samnite civilization is the short sword. Short swords were carried using a long strap fastened to either the warrior's body or the sword's hilt. Samnite art depicts soldiers receiving swords in ritual ceremonies, and warriors eager to receive swords, implying that short swords were highly valued in Samnite society. Maces were rarer than spears or javelins, yet still common. They had heavy and undecorated iron heads attached to a handle hoisted with a hole or a socket. Axes were rarely used; they may have primarily been symbols of power.

There is little archaeological record of the Samnite shield, as most of the remaining shields have had much of their components destroyed. Samnite art commonly depicts Samnite soldiers using a round shield called an aspis. To carry the shield, two straps were used. One strap was leather, decorated with patterns, and ran vertically over the middle of the shield. Another strap – used to provide a firm grip – ran vertically near the shield's edge. Alongside aspides, the Samnites possibly used bronze oval shields with pointed ends and incised decorations. It is possible that the Samnites used scuta. It is also possible that the Samnite scutum influenced the Roman shield; however, evidence for this is unclear. Samnite art depicts their soldiers carrying scuta; however, it is either as trophies taken from the enemy or an attempt to mimic ancient Greek art. Livy states that the Samnite shield was broad near the shoulder and chest, but thinner closer to the feet. Archaeological evidence does not substantiate this idea. Livy possibly mistook the equipment of a Samnite gladiator for that of a Samnite soldier.

== Culture ==
=== Religion ===
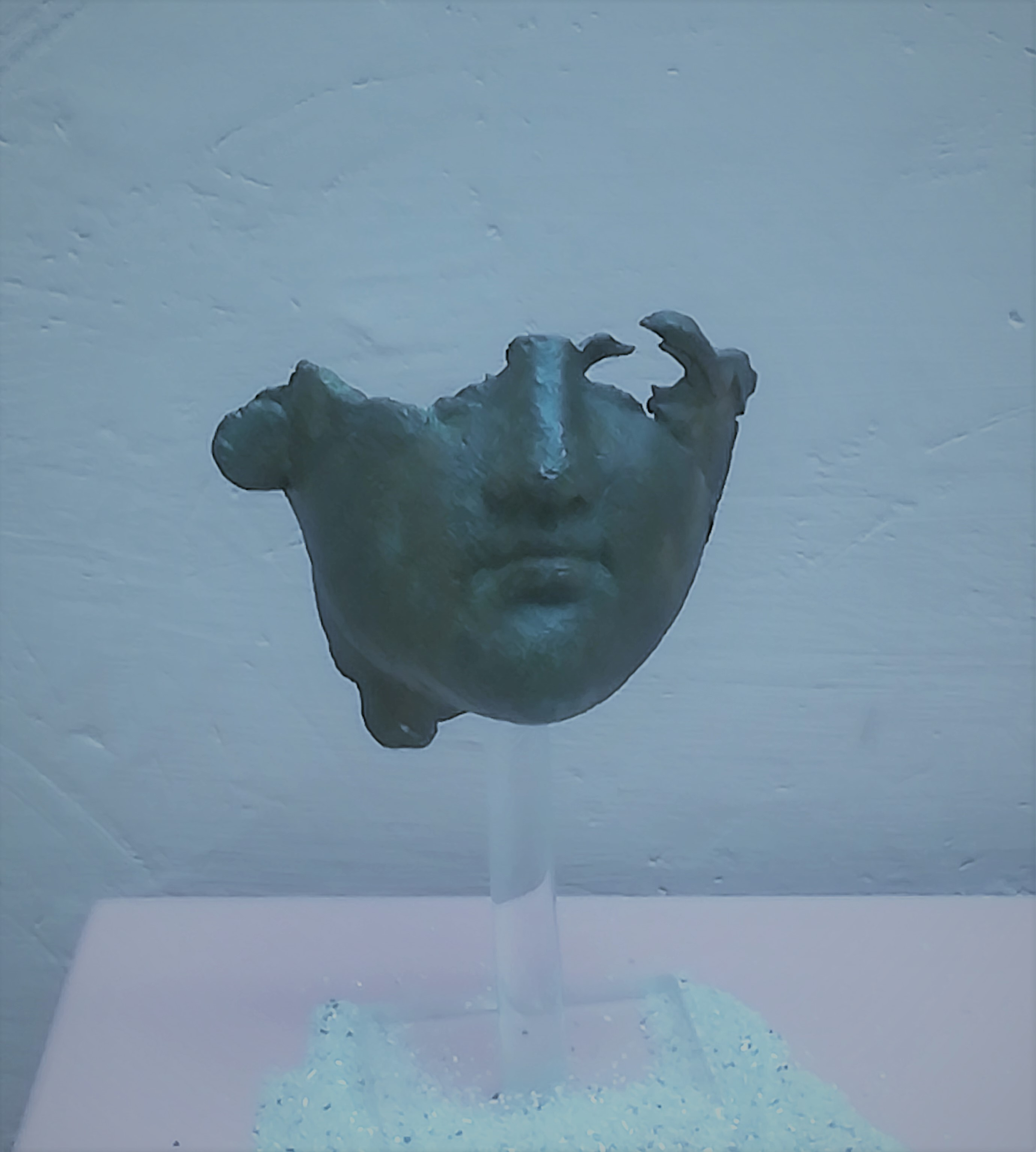
Face of Mefitis, a Samnite goddess

Superstition dominated Samnite culture. They believed magic could influence reality and practiced augury. Vaguely defined spirits called numina were also prominent in Samnite mythology. It was essential to establish proper relations with these spirits, which evolved into the Samnite gods and goddesses. Few of these Samnite deities are known. It is known that gods such as Vulcan, Diana, and Mefitis were all worshipped, with Mars being the most prominent in the Samnite religion. To honor their gods, votive offerings and animals would be sacrificed. In a practice known as the Ver Sacrum, all things produced in a particular year would be exiled or offered to the gods. The description of these practices may have been fabricated by Livy for propaganda purposes.

Samnite gravesites often contained goods. For example, wealthy individuals had graves with statues or steles. These goods indicated the wealth and status of the individual in life. Burials required that certain practices be observed in order to bury the dead adequately. Burial was likely a sign of social status as it was rare to be buried, despite the Samnite belief in an afterlife.

Sanctuaries were important to the Samnite religion. They served a variety of purposes: they siphoned money off transhumance routes, marked borders, served as centers for communication and places of worship, and played a role in government. Over time, sanctuaries become much less prominent in Samnite culture, and were all abandoned soon afterwards.

=== Gender roles ===
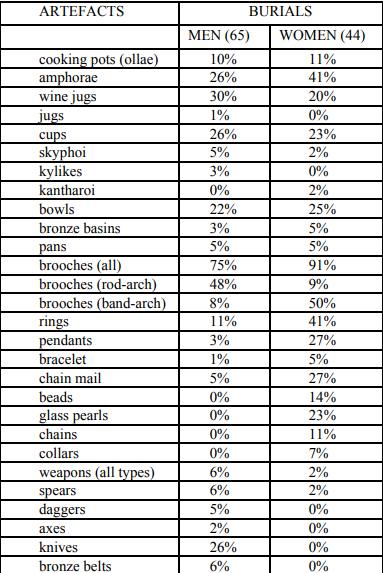
Graph showcasing the correlation between burial goods and gender at Campo Consolino

There were two major roles for Samnite women: domestic and ceremonial. Women would weave, which likely played an important role in the economy. They also likely exercised a small amount of political power through the symposium, which was a kind of ancient Greek or Etruscan banquet. Other responsibilities included teaching young girls how to dance, childrearing, and possibly managing the household. Relationships between Samnite wives and husbands are unclear. Libation scenes might suggest that a wife was supposed to be dutiful and loyal to her husband. Women may have been expected to be disciplined—in Horace's Odes he complains about women lacking these traits. He possibly based his expectations of women on Samnite customs. Another possibility is that women were capable of acquiring large amounts of wealth. However, they might have only been capable of displaying their partner's wealth. Artwork and pottery depicting Samnite women showcase them involved in rituals or nearby altars with votive offerings. These rituals usually involve women honoring their husbands through offerings of wine, or possibly praying for their husbands before they leave to fight.

The geographer Strabo states that the Samnites would take ten virgin women and ten young men, who were considered to be the best representation of their sex, and marry them. Following this, the second-best women would be given to the second-best males. This would continue until all 20 people had been assigned to one another. It is possible that the "best" men and women were chosen based on athletic capabilities. If any of the individuals involved dishonored themselves, they would be displaced and forcibly separated from their partners.

Samnite society may have enforced a distinction between men, who were supposed to be warriors, and women, who were supposed to be "bejeweled". Ancient historians describe the Samnites as a warlike people; however much of this is possibly propaganda. Campanian pottery often depicts Samnite warriors and cavalrymen fighting, while Apulian pottery tends to depict them in a wider variety of circumstances. Pottery from those same cultures also depicts armed men involved with other activities such as burying the dead or marriage. Differences between male and female graves also support this theory. Men were buried with weapons and armor, while women were buried with domestic goods such as spindles or jewelry. Young adult women were typically buried with coils, pendants, beads, clothing, spindles, and fibulae similar to those worn by boys, possibly meaning that femininity was tied to youth in Samnite culture. Men wore much smaller and less elaborate fibulae, possibly indicating that the male identity was tied to maturity. The skeletons of men and women also show differences in trauma. Male skeletons found near Pontecagnano Faiano have a cranial trauma rate of 13%, while only 8% of female skeletons showed cranial trauma. Another community at Alfedena has male Samnite skeletons with similar rates of cranial injury. This indicates that Samnite men may have been expected to serve as warriors and fight, while women were not.

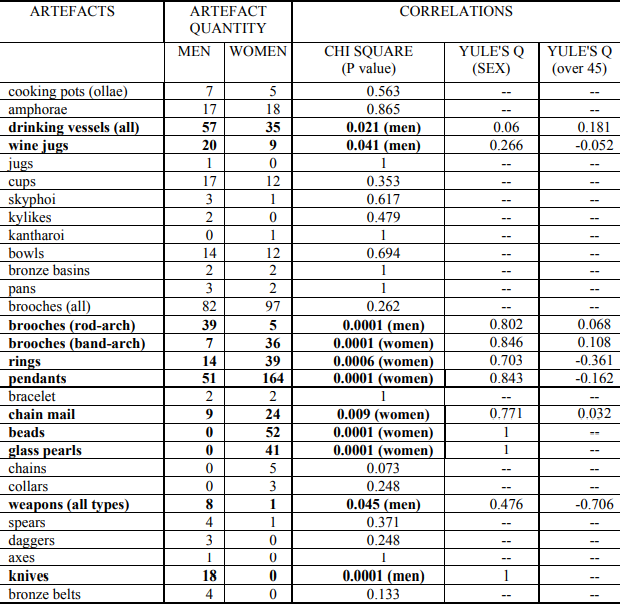
Graph depicting the percentage of male or female graves at Campo Consolino buried with a certain good

However, a large number of graves are not buried with their respective gender's items. Samnite men have been buried with goods typically associated with women, and a few Samnite women have been buried with goods associated with men. Only 3% of men in Campo Consolino were buried with their respective gender's goods, while one in five women were buried with weaponry. Men have also been found buried with domestic goods. This could be explained if these goods were not indicative of the person's responsibilities in life, but instead were offerings to the dead. The rarity of certain burial goods could indicate that they were exclusive to high-status individuals. For example, jewelry could be explained as an indication of wealth or femininity. Differences in jewelry between the graves of adolescent and young adult women could be a form of preventative healthcare; it may have been done to protect them in childbirth.

Analysis of skeletons has shown that both genders have fractures, lesions, and injuries, although men have these injuries much more commonly. This difference could be explained by greater amounts of male skeletons than female skeletons. Other skeletons showcase similarities between the lives of men and women. For example, both have healthy teeth, implying that they had healthy diets with low amounts of carbohydrates. The art depicts groups of both men and women honoring both dead men and women, indicating that Samnite men and women could be honored in similar ways after death. Each gender may have had different, but equally important roles. Another possibility is that the Samnites had two categories for gender, one being adult males, and the other, everyone else.

The Samnites possibly practiced ritualized prostitution. Young women of all social standings would engage in sexual activities as a rite of passage. It is possible this practice would transform from a ritual into a profession.

=== Art ===
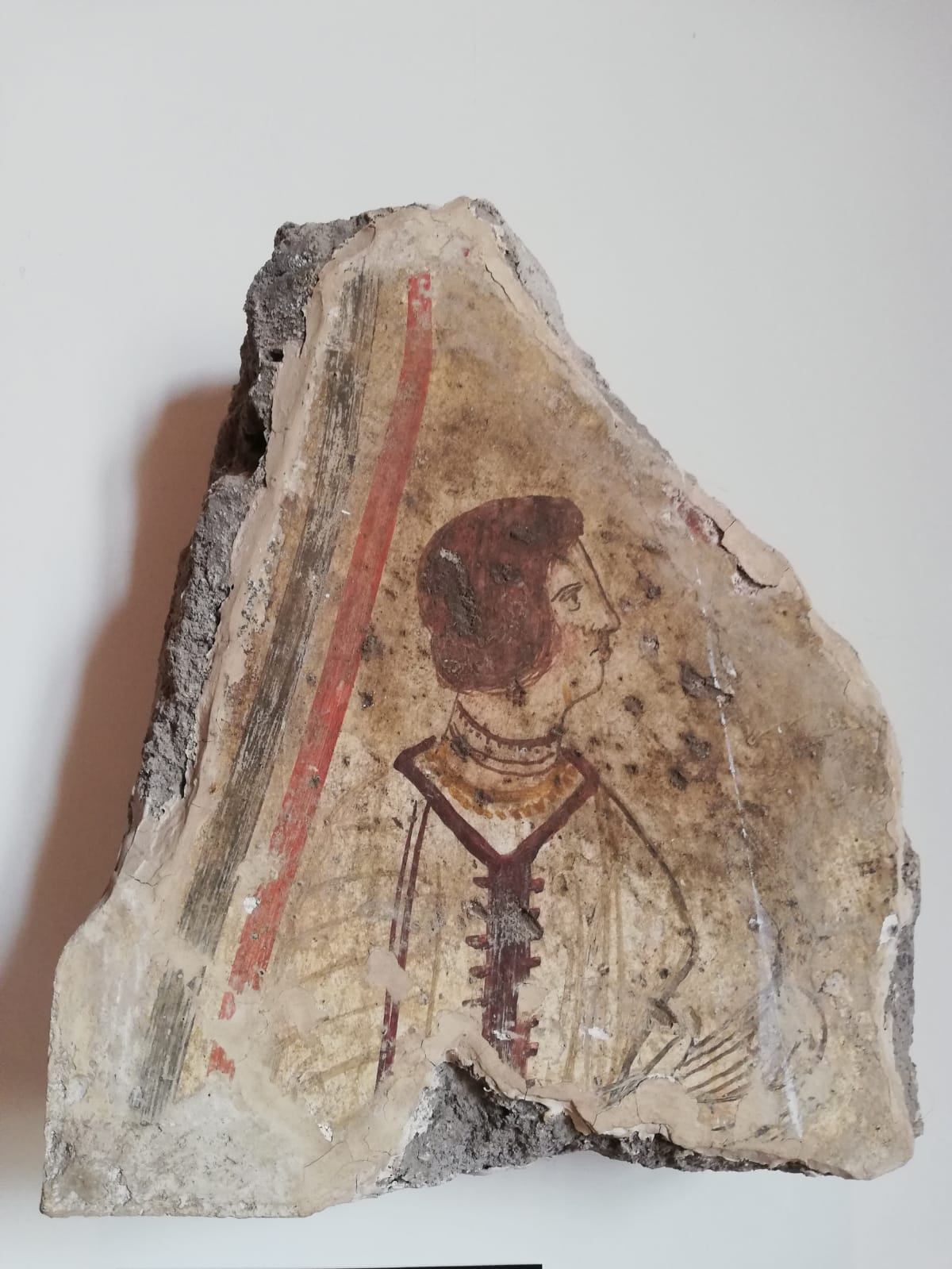
Fragment of Samnite art from the Museo Campano

The first art style used by the Samnites in Pompeii developed when Greek painters traveled to Italy to paint for local aristocrats. It borrows elements from Greek, Etruscan, and other Italic art. For example, hierarchy of scale, clothing demonstrating status, captions, episodic narratives, and depictions of history were all borrowed from other cultures.

Samnite art featured polychrome murals and paintings. The murals usually used black or red cement pavements outlined with designs that ran across tesserae. There were two different styles of tesserae: worm-like, or miculatum, and woven-style, or oppus tessellatum,. Miculatum consisted of inserting marble and terracotta trays into a mosaic floor. The oppus tessellatum style used tesserae to create an appearance resembling weaving. Samnite art was usually colorful, and it often depicted myths, warriors, or Greek subjects. Murals found in Pompeii were designed to create an idyllic sense.

Aside from the murals, other works of Samnite art have survived to the modern day. On the walls of a sanctuary at Pietrabbondate there is an unidentifiable relief that is possibly an atlas. Another possible work of Samnite or Roman origin in Isernia depicts two helmeted warriors. One example of Samnite figurative art may be the Warrior of Capestrano. The statue was, however, found in Vestini territory and depicts a Picentine warrior.

=== Clothing ===
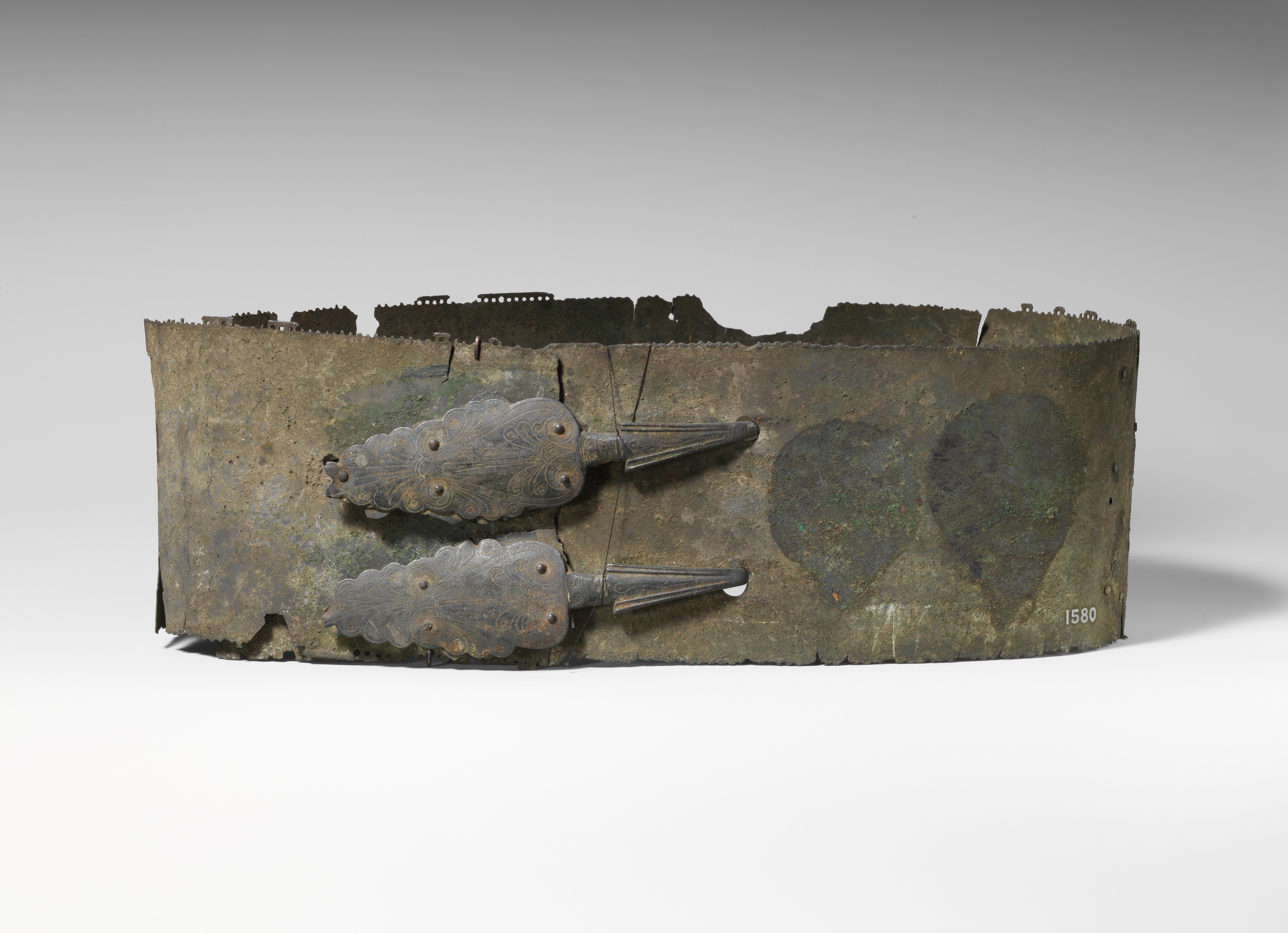
Samnite bronze belt with a clasp

Most Samnite clothes were loose, pinned, draped, folded, and not stitched or sewn. Clothing held symbolic and ritual purposes in Samnite society. For example, clothing indicated social status, and chitons were often used in ceremonies. The most valuable kind of clothing was a fastened bronze or leather girdle covered in bronze.

Men wore rings, amulets with snake heads, and collars. Collars were usually pierced with holes from which they suspended amulets and pendants and engraved with incised decorations. Collars would be given to the man in boyhood, and never removed. Bearskins were also common clothing.

Female clothing was similar to Greek apparel. Women wore long sleeveless peplum, caps, hats similar to a pileus, chitons, decorated belts, and chatelaine. The chatelaine had a central section consisting of mail and metal spirals made from perforated discs of metal. An essential part of Samnite women's clothing was garments long enough to touch the ground. These were worn alongside colored capes that were fastened beneath the chin and held together with a brooch. Samnite capes covered the whole upper body, the arms, and the legs, although necklaces and amulets remained visible, as the neckline of the cape did not touch the shoulders. Women also wore another kind of cape similar to a jacket. This jacket had sleeves, was fastened at the front, used a low-cut neckline, and fit the body tightly, covering much of it with folding. The frontal part of the jacket hung just below the waist, which is also nearby where it was kept. Samnite skirts were heavily influenced by Greek clothing. They covered with a himation that usually also covered the hips as well as drapery. Women wore headdresses made from a folded piece of cloth. One depiction of this kind of headdress shows it as a long veil that was folded and ran across the head. Another piece of art shows a Samnite woman wearing a hairnet beneath a cylindrical headdress with white and red stripes running across it. Some kinds of clothing were gender neutral. Red, white, or black belts covered in motifs that were usually made by using hooks to fasten cloth or leather into holes were worn by both genders. It was common in ancient Samnium for both men and women to wear no footwear. Despite this, numerous shoe styles still existed. Some shoes were low, some reached to the ankles, and others had a small hole at their tip. Another kind used an accentuated upper edge and reached higher than the ankles. Styles of footwear did not vary greatly between gender, except for styles of boot. Female boots were usually ankle-high, while male boots reached higher. To secure the lacing of the shoe, white buttons and pointed, curved, or short lines that ran across horizontal laces could be used. Samnite sandals had white soles that used a strap to attach the soles to the foot. One kind of sandal left the foot uncovered, while the other covered it up. Socks may have existed in ancient Samnium. If they did not, an alternative could have existed, such as a sort of soft fabric used as a replacement for socks.

Italic pottery and Samnite tomb paintings depict Samnite warriors wearing tunics. These were usually made from one piece of cloth and decorated with black or white motifs that were almost always placed on the sleeves, though rarely on the lower part of the tunic. Common motifs included stripes or dots. Tunics were held together at the midriff by broad leather belts.

Livy describes Samnite soldiers wearing two kinds of clothing. One was referred to as versicolor, meaning the clothing used contrasting colors. These clothes might have been designed to give a chameleon-like appearance Livy may have intended to invoke ideas of Aeneas, who once allied with a warrior named Astyr, who had multi-colored weapons and armor. It also may have been designed to showcase the worthiness of the Samnites as opponents of Rome. These are not the only possibilities—Livy may have wanted to reference Plato's Republic, which compares Republics to a multi-colored garment. Also, multi-colored clothing may have symbolized wealth. The other group of Samnites wore silver clothing and carried weapons.

=== Recreation ===
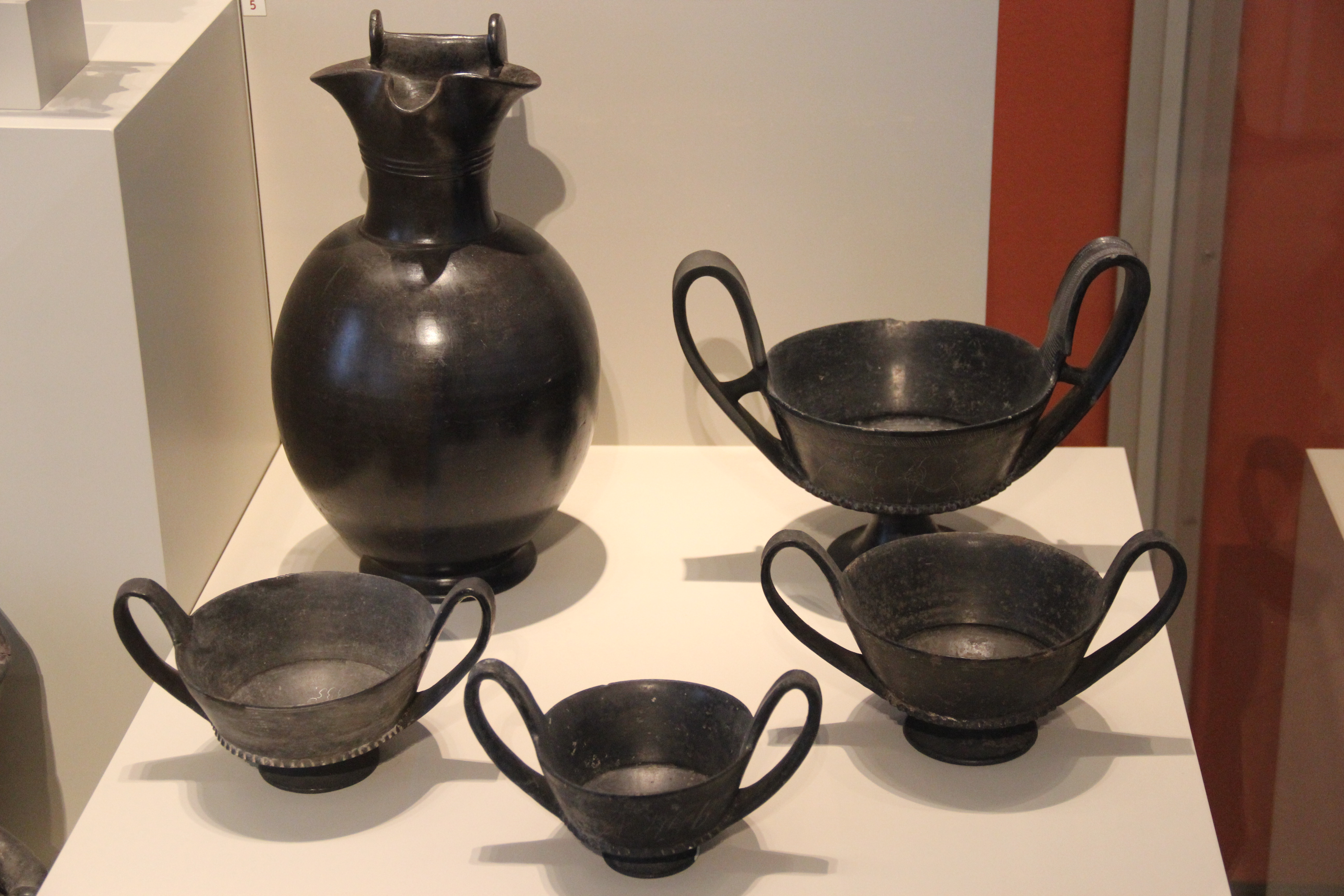
Etruscan bucchero. These kinds of cups would have been used by the Samnites

Drinking and eating were very important to the life of the Samnites. It served as a way to entertain, and to establish social networks, and to negotiate politics or labor. Whilst eating, the host would distribute food and drink to the guests. It was rare for wine to be given to adult men, although it was consumed by other demographics. Banquets used large containers or mixing vessels, serving vessels, and small pieces for individuals' consumption. Large containers were often amphorae or kraters. Serving vessels were usually dippers, or jugs. The smaller vessels were usually cups, beakers, kylikes, and kantharoi. It was common to import these goods, for example, bucchero was commonly imported from Etruria.

Gladiatorial games may have originated in Samnium. Roman and Greek authors such as Livy, Strabo, Horace, Athenaeus, and Silius Italicus mention that the Campanian aristocrats would host gladiator games during their banquets. It is possible that the Samnite gladiator originated from these Oscan and Samnite games. However, evidence for this is inconclusive. Other scholars believe that gladiatorial games originated from Etruria, the Celts, or the city of Mantineia. The word lanista may imply a connection between gladiatorial games and the Etruscans. Although the earliest gladiators were called Samnites, the word lanista may have no connection to the Etruscans. Art from Campania depicts Samnites in gladiatorial games. One piece of art depicts a dead gladiator with a spear stuck in the head. This indicates that the Samnites likely were not averse to brutality. Art also showcases large gladiatorial games alongside chariot racing and banquets, implying that Samnite gladiatorial games were grandiose and for entertainment. Alternatively, these games may have been conducted at funerals. Games are usually depicted taking place near funerals, and pomegranates are depicted in the background, which was symbols of the afterlife. The warriors in these funerary games are depicted wearing colorful armor.

Chariot racing and hunting with projectile weaponry were recreational activates practiced by Samnite men. In Pompeii, ancient baths were built during the time the Samnites ruled the city.

=== Cities and engineering ===
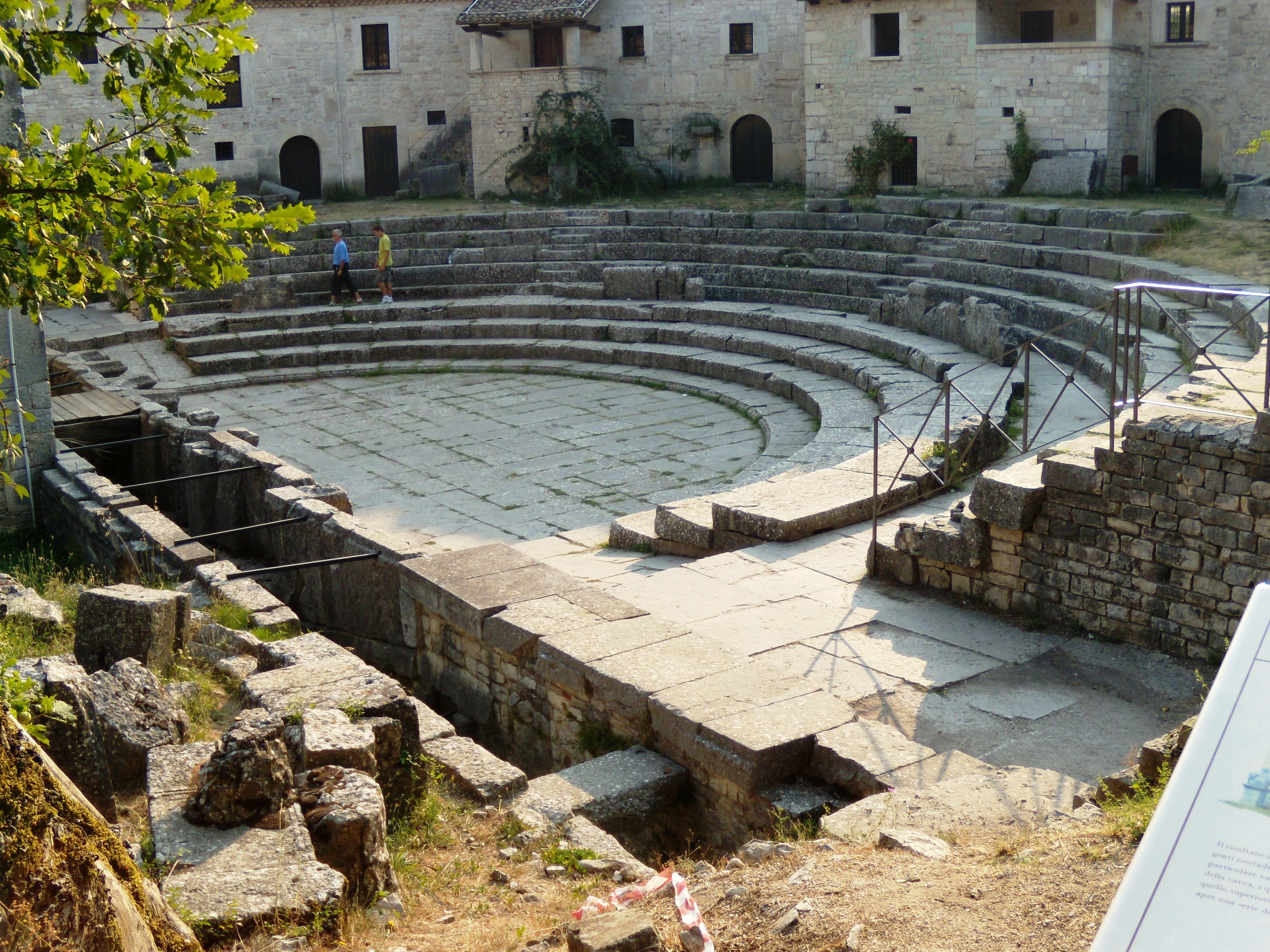
Theater in Saepinum

From the Bronze to the Iron Age, the number of Samnite settlements drastically increased. Most of these settlements were small, with most people living in hamlets and working for a living. These small settlements organized around larger settlements, such as Saepinum and Caiatia. Samnite cities were generally not as large as those in the rest of Italy. While most settlements were small and dispersed, some larger fortified centres developed planned infrastructure including road networks, communal cisterns, and commercial areas. Roads called tratturi were used to connect the summer pastures to those of winter. Alongside these roads, Samnite cities had buildings such as temples, dining complexes, houses, and sanctuaries. Their cities had no buildings similar to a forum or an Agora, except for the city of Pompeii, which had a small forum with irregular architecture and tabernae, though some larger fortified centres show evidence of integrated public and commercial space.

Samnite cities began to develop walls and other defensive fortifications during the Samnite Wars. Walls were usually rough and crude, and located by the crest of a hill with no other defenses nearby. This indicated that they were built to allow the defending army to retreat and regroup, rather than protect the city. City gates were heavily fortified on the left side, but not on the right. This was done to force soldiers to attack the city on the side they were not holding their shield on.

Hillforts built with polygonal walling may have been either a common defensive fortification or a form of settlement that represented a transitional phase between a more rural society and a more urban one. It is unclear if these hillforts were permanent defenses as they may have only been inhabited temporarily. Scholars have proposed other possible purposes for the Samnite hillforts. They may have played a role in government. Forts may have also been used to pass along signals by fire.

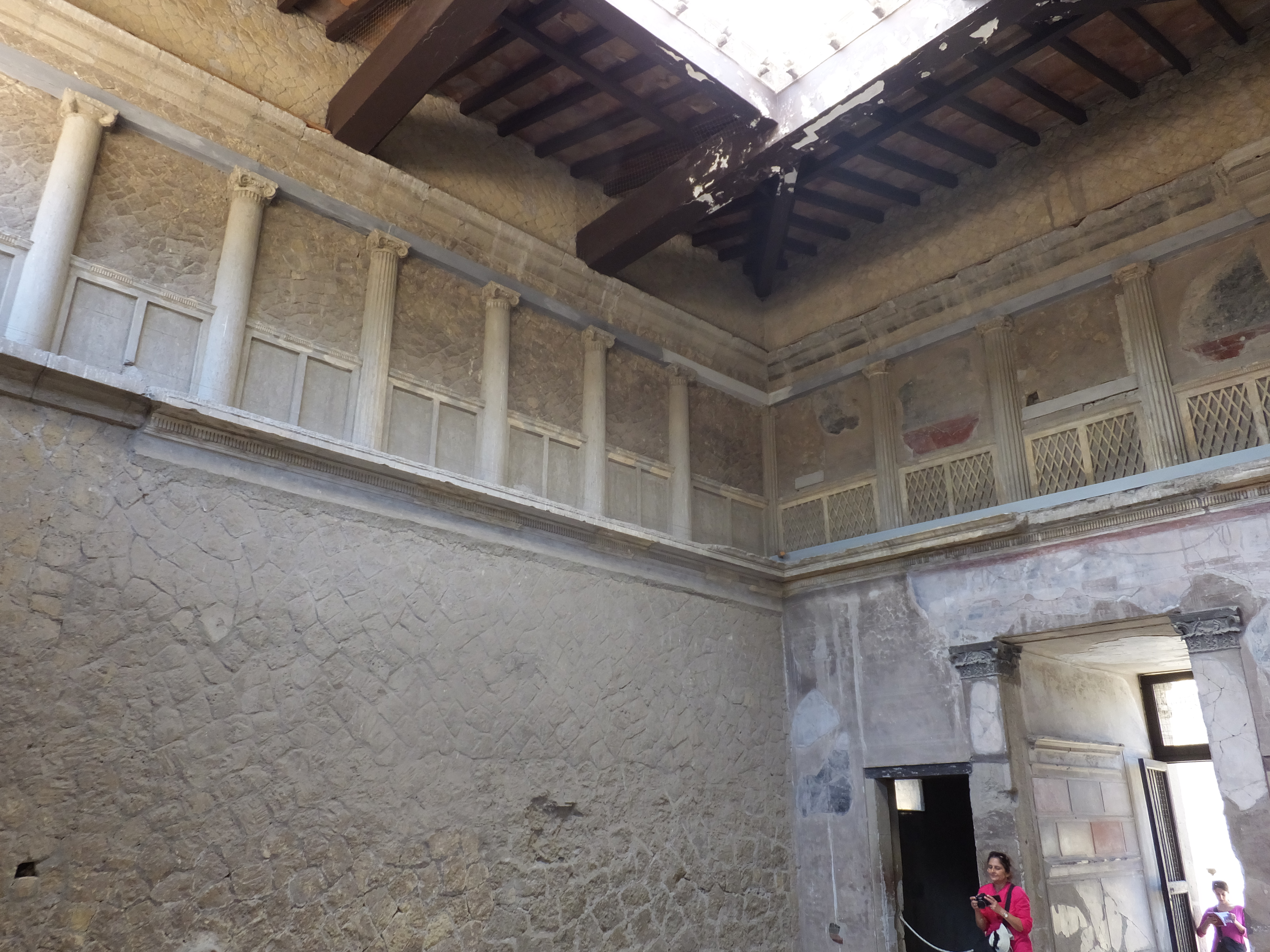
Samnite house in Herculaneum

Samnite architecture in Pompeii or Herculaneum often resembled that of Greek architecture. For example, palaestras, colonnades, stoai, and columns were all borrowed from the Greeks. Other techniques were borrowed from the Etruscans. Such as breaking up orthostates with narrow blocks. The Samnite palaestra in Pompeii is made from a rectangular courtyard surrounded by porticos and Doric columns made of tufa. A peristyle courtyard lies to the west of the palaestra. This building was similar to Greek palaestra, and was likely either a gymnasium, religious site, or a campus. Houses were built on foundations topped with smaller blocks laid in courses. In order to elevate the foundation, dados and orthostats were inserted into the fauces. Blocks of stone also needed to be put alongside the base of the wall. Walls were usually made of rubble. The rubble could have been carved to make it resemble carved blocks of stone, rather than rubble. Alongside this practice, layers of plaster were spread over it. Plaster was also used to make frescoes. This was done by applying pigment to the plaster whilst it was damp. Another construction material called stucco was often painted, creating the appearance of a house covered in marble. Atriums were a common feature of Samnite houses. They used impulviums, loggia, and cellae. Façades made of tuff, tabernae, peristyles, dentil cornices supported by cubic capitals, which are the upper part of a column, used figurines and were all located outside of the houses. Roofs with downspouts made of stone and tiles.

Small, personal, and makeshift farms or houses were common buildings. One farmhouse found near Campobasso consists of a square module, which was likely a stable house, and a series of rooms with hearths centered around a courthouse. The house has a small mortar line basin, a dolia, and other container vessels. Indicating that these materials were used for the process and storage of produce. Another farmstead was built in 200 BC using limestone blocks held together by yellow mortar. An archaeological site known as "ACQ 11000" had a terrace covered in thick clay, a walled space with a paved floor, and a stone wall.

== Notable Samnites ==
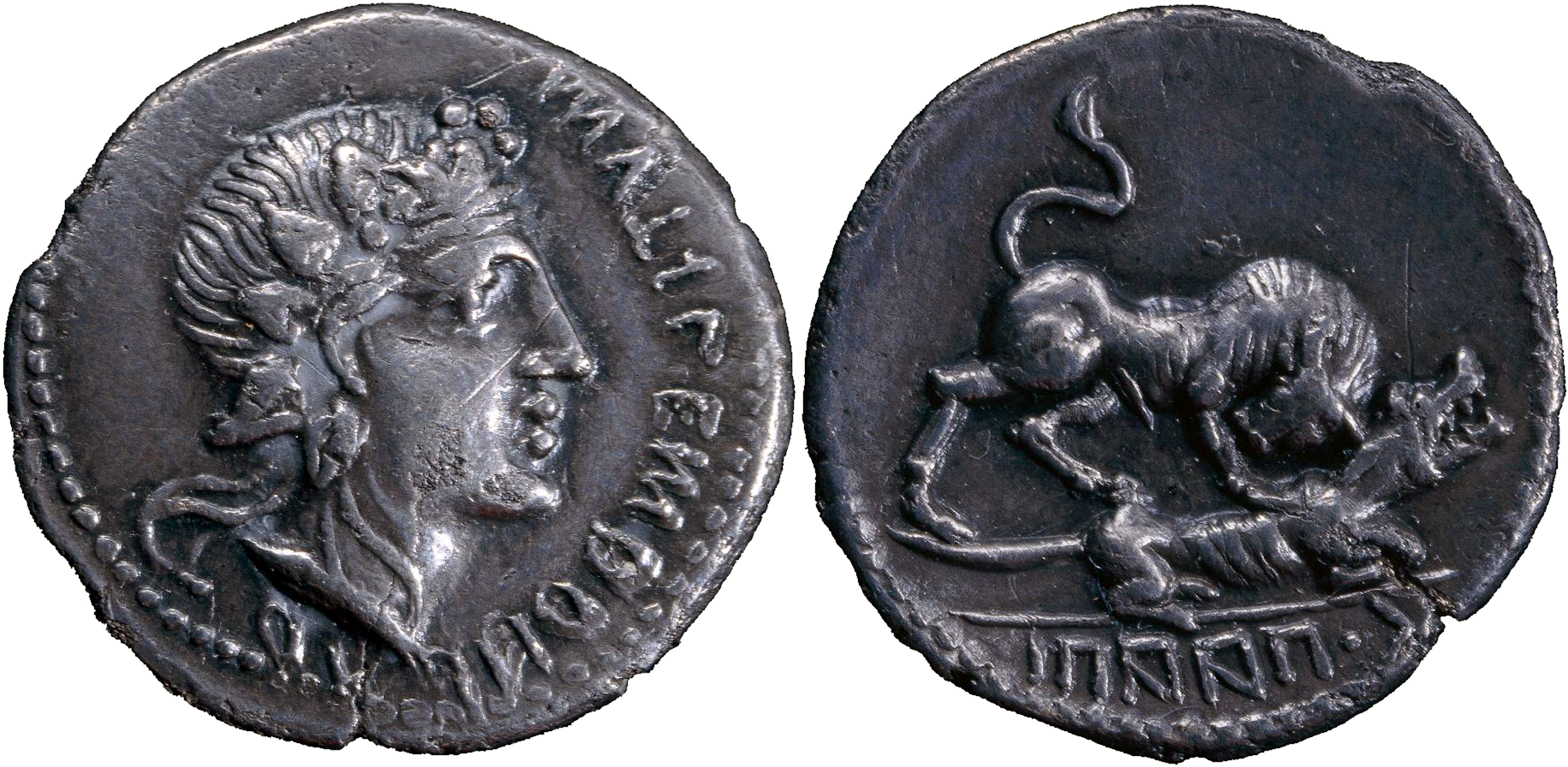
Coin from 90 BC depicting Gaius Papius Mutilus

=== Leaders of the Samnites ===
- Gaius Pontius ca. 320s BC.
- Gellius Egnatius ca. 296 BC.
- Herenius Pontius, a Samnite philosopher.
- Brutulus Papius, a Samnite aristocrat mentioned by Livy.
- N. Papius Mr. f, Meddix Tuticus in 190 BC.
- Statius Gellius, general during the Samnite Wars.
- Staius Minatius, general during the Samnite Wars.
- N. Papius Maras Metellus, Meddix Tuticus in 100 BC.
- Numerius Statius, Meddix Tuticus in 130 BC.
- Gaius Statius Clarus, Meddix Tuticus around 90 BC.
- Olus Egnatius, Meddix Tuticus in the 2nd century BC.
- Titus Staius, Meddix Tuticus in the 2nd century BC.
- Gnaeus Staius Marahis Stafidinus, Meddix Tuticus in the 2nd century BC.
- Ovius Staius, Samnite in the 2nd century BC. May have built a statue to Hercules in the sanctuary by Campochiaro.
- Gaius Statius Clarus, Samnite who constructed the podium in the temple of Pietrabbondante.
- Stenis Staius Metellus, Meddix Tuticus 130 BC. Possibly built the sanctuary in Campochiaro.
- Maras Staius Bacius, builder of the Pietrabbondante sanctuary.
- Pacius Staius Lucius, builder of the Pietrabbondante sanctuary.
- Papius N. f, Meddix Tuticus in 160 BC.
- C. Papius Met. f, Meddix Tuticus in 130 BC.
- N. Papius Mr.f. Mt. n, Meddix Tuticus in 100 BC.
- L. Staius Ov. f. Met. n, Meddix Tuticus in Bovianum in 130 BC.
- Minatius Staius Stati f, Meddix Tuticus of Bovianum and Pietrabbondante in 120 BC.
- L. Staius Mr. f, Meddix Tuticus in 120 BC.
- Staius Sn. f, Meddix Tuticus in 100 BC.
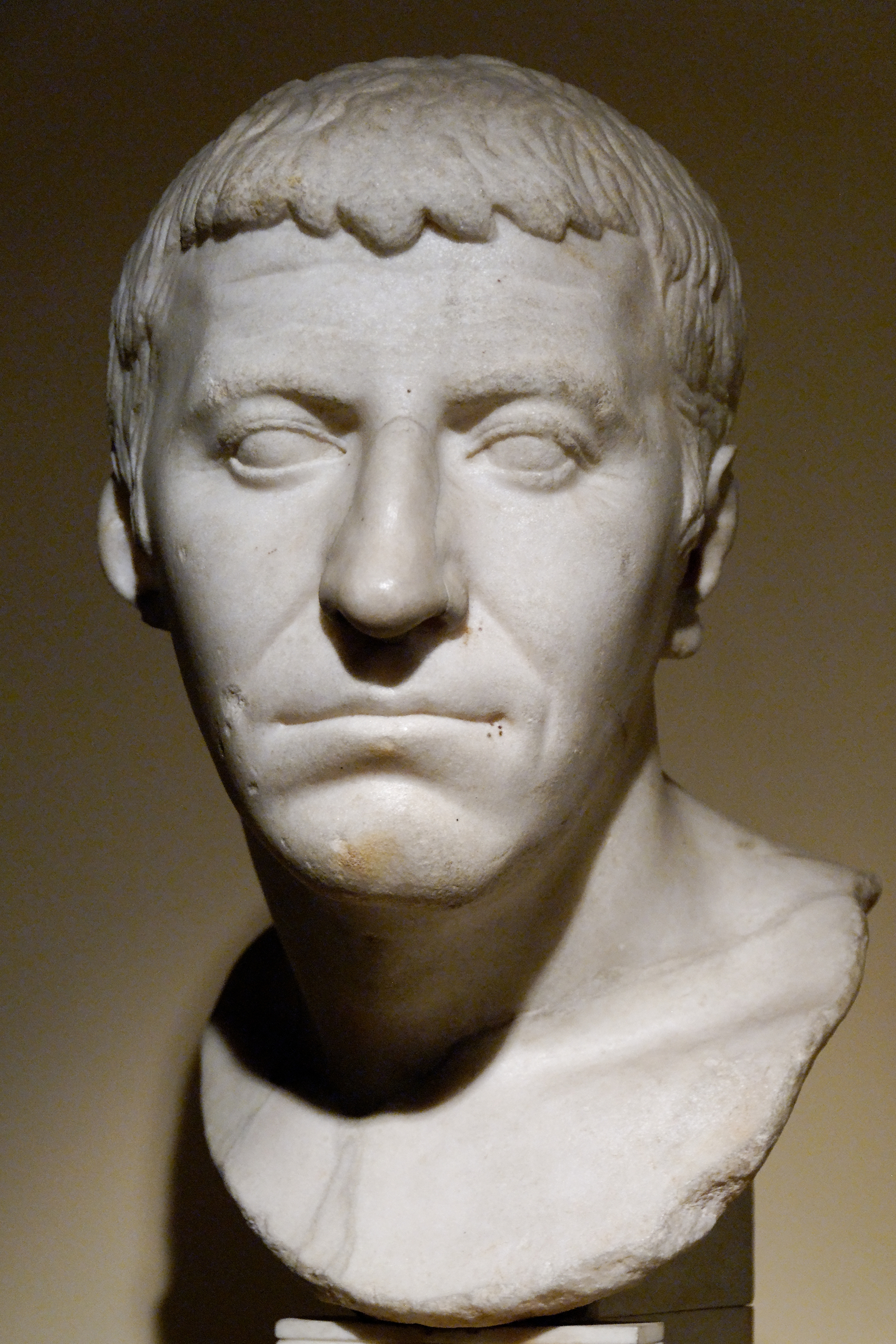
- Bust of Gaius Cassius Longinus
  Gaius Papius, builder of the temple in the Schiavi d'Abruzzo sanctuary.

=== Social war leaders ===
- Gaius Papius Mutilus, served as Meddix Tuticus.
- Pontius Telesinus, died 82 BC
- Marius Egnatius, Social War general

=== Romans of Samnite origin ===
- Gaius Cassius Longinus – assassin of Julius Caesar
- Pontius Pilate – the 5th praefectus Iudaeae of the Roman province of Judaea from AD 26–36. He was responsible for ordering the crucifixion of Jesus.
- Caecilius Statius – Roman comic poet that was possibly of Samnite origin.

=== Catholic popes ===
- Pope Felix IV – Catholic pope from July 12, 526 to September 22, 530.

== See also ==
- Frentani
- Samnite Wars
- List of ancient Italic peoples
- Sabellians

== Bibliography ==
- Farkas, Nikoletta (2006). Leadership among the Samnites and related Oscan-speaking peoples between the fifth and first centuries BC (PDF) (PhD thesis). King's College London.
- Forsythe, Gary (2005). A Critical History of Early Rome: From Prehistory to the First Punic War. Berkeley: University of California Press.
- Howard, Jones (2004). Samnium: Settlement and Cultural Change: the Proceedings of the Third E. Togo Salmon Conference On Roman Studies. Providence: RI: Center for Old World Archaeology and Art.
- Paget, R. F. (1973). Central Italy: An Archaeological Guide; the Prehistoric, Villanovan, Etruscan, Samnite, Italic, and Roman Remains, and the Ancient Road Systems. 1st U.S. ed. Park Ridge, NJ: Noyes Press.
- Pokorny, Julius (2005) [1959]. Indogermanisches etymologisches Woerterbuch. Leiden: Leiden University Indo-European Etymological Dictiopnary (IEED) Project. Archived from the original on 2006-09-27.
- Salmon, ET (1967). Samnium and the Samnites. London: Cambridge University Press.
- Salvucci, Claudio (1999). A Vocabulary of Oscan: Including the Oscan and Samnite Glosses. Southampton: Pa.: Evolution Pub.
- Stek, Tesse (2010). Cult Places and Cultural Change In Republican Italy: A Contextual Approach to Religious Aspects of Rural Society After the Roman Conquest. Amsterdam: Amsterdam University Press.
