= Pontius Telesinus =

Italic Samnite leader (died 82 BC)

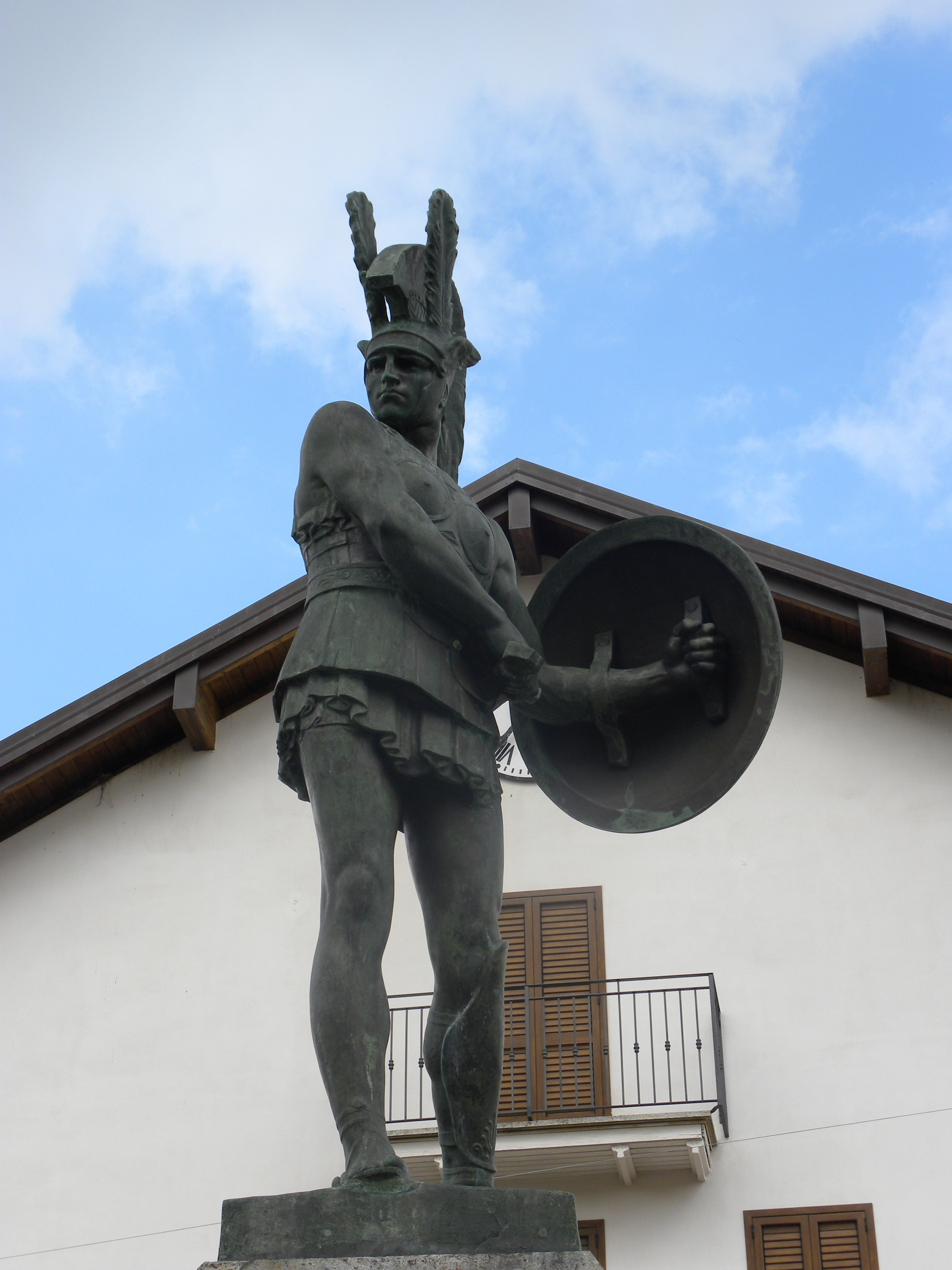

Pontius Telesinus (died 2 November 82 BC) was the last independent leader of the Italic Samnites before their annexation by the Roman Republic. A fierce patriot, he was one of the rebel commanders in the Social War (91–87 BC) against Rome, leading the last remnants of the rebellion in southern Italy after the main uprising had already been suppressed. He intervened in the Roman civil wars of the 80s BC in an attempt to improve his and his people's position, but picked the losing side and was killed in 82 BC following the Battle of the Colline Gate against the Roman general Sulla.

== Life ==
The Samnites were a people who inhabited central and southern Italy, and had fought several wars against the Roman Republic before being subjugated in the third century BC. Pontius Telesinus claimed descent from Gaius Pontius, the Samnite leader who had humiliated the Romans at the Caudine Forks in 321 BC. The surname (cognomen) "Telesinus" indicates an origin in Telesia. Several Roman sources list Pontius as one of the leaders of the Samnites during the Social War against Rome in 91 BC, holding the rank of "praetor", but no specific actions of his in the main part of the conflict are known. (Note: The sources may have confused Telesinus's role in the later stage of the rebellion and subsequent civil wars with the main period of the Social War itself.) The rebellion collapsed by 88 BC, but Telesinus appears to have led the remnants of the Italian resistance to Rome in Lucania and Bruttium. In late 88 or early 87 BC, he and other remaining rebel leaders (Note: Diodorus Siculus gives a garbled set of names which includes Marcus (L)a(m)ponius and "Pompeius". The latter name is thought to be a corruption of "Pontius", especially since Telesinus and Lamponius operated in conjunction with each other elsewhere. On the other hand, E.T. Salmon also proposed interpreting Pompeius as Papius Mutilus, another Samnite commander.) besieged Isiae in Bruttium and Rhegium on the strait of Messina, but were repelled by the Roman governor of Sicily, Gaius Norbanus. Nonetheless, they were able to make peace with Rome on favorable terms by siding with the Roman consul Cornelius Cinna in the civil war of 87 BC.

The Samnites took up arms again in 82 BC, together the allied Lucanians, to aid the Roman government in another civil war, this time against the renegade Roman general Sulla. Pontius Telesinus's younger brother and a contingent of Samnites were among the forces of the Roman consul Marius which fought Sulla at the Battle of Sacriportus. They were heavily defeated and subsequently besieged at Praeneste. After the victory, Sulla took the city of Rome. Hearing of this disaster, Pontius Telesinus and the Lucanian leader Marcus Lamponius raised a large force to relieve Marius at Praeneste, but, finding that Sulla's armies were both blocking the road to the city and threatening their rear, decided instead to march towards Rome, encamping near the Colline Gate.

Some Roman sources present the Samnites as a self-interested party who took advantage of the civil war to undermine the Roman Republic while pretending to aid the cause of Marius. According to Florus, they laid waste to Campania, while Velleius Paterculus described Telesinus as a man "brave in spirit and in action and hating to the core the very name of Rome". Velleius also said the Samnites planned to destroy the city of Rome itself; according to him, Telesinus exclaimed to his men:

"The last day is at hand for the Romans. These wolves that made such ravages upon Italian liberty will never vanish until we have cut down the forest that harbors them."

Later historians were sceptical of this, wondering whether the Samnites, as participants of a Roman inter-factional conflict, would have really acted in such manner. On 1 November 82 BC, the Samnites and Lucanians were defeated at the Battle of the Colline Gate, which lasted into the night. Telesinus was found on the following day mortally wounded on the field; according to Velleius, he had the look of a conqueror in his face despite the defeat. His head was cut off and paraded before the walls of Praeneste, where Marius and Telesinus's brother then committed joint suicide in despair.

As Ollivier described, a skilled general and ardent patriot like Telesinus formed the center and focus of the Samnites' efforts for self-determination; with the loss of their natural leader, the Samnites scattered and their war effort collapsed. With Telesinus ended the last expression of resistance by the Samnites against Roman domination.

Pontius Telesinus may be an ancestor of Pontius Pilatus (Pilate), a first century Roman governor of Judaea mentioned in Christian texts as presiding over the execution of Jesus.
