= Pontia (murderer) =

Pontia was an ancient Roman murderer who killed her two sons using poison. Juvenal, an early 2nd-century Roman poet, provides a quote written from her perspective wherein she confesses to the crime, stating "I did it! I admit it! I gave aconite to my children. The crime was detected. It’s common knowledge—but I myself perpetrated the crime!" Two manuscripts of Juvenal provide additional details on her life in the form of scholia. According to the original text of the scholiasts' comments, she was supposedly the daughter of an individual named Publius Petronius, and—according to the scholiasts—she committed the murder following the death of her husband and then later died whilst dancing with slit veins. These two manuscripts also mention that she was convicted of having conspired against Emperor Nero. The first few words of the original text reads "the daughter of Publius Petronius, whom, having been convicted" ("Publi Petroni filia, quam Nero convictam"), yet they were emended by the 17th century philologist Justus Lipsius to read "the daughter of Publius Petronius, whom [referring to Petronius], having been convicted" ("Publi Petroni filia, quem Nero convictum"). This edited version of the text has been used to justify an identification of the Publius Petronius mentioned in this passage with Petronius Arbiter, though—according to the classicists Thomas Völker and Dirk Rohmann—this alteration to the text is entirely unjustified. Völker and Rohmann further note that there is no connection between the name of Pontia and that of Petronius Arbiter. Consequently, it has been alternatively suggested that the Publius Petronius mentioned by the scholiast may be identified with Gaius Petronius Pontius Nigrinus.

It is likely that the confession is merely the result of Juvenal's own poetic license rather than an actual statement from Pontia. The language of the passage is parallel to, and perhaps borrowed from, works of Roman tragedy. For example, in the play Medea by Seneca, the character of Jason—distraught at the death of his son at the hands of Medea—laments "Now finish the deed you have done" ("Iam perage coeptum facinus"), whereas—in Juvenal's works—Pontia declares "In any case, it was I who did it" ("facinus tamen ipsa peregi"), with both passages reusing the words perago and facinus. Moreover, in the play Medea, the titular character herself declares "even if I kill two, the number is too small for my pain" ("ut duos perimam, tamen nimium est dolori numerus angustus meo"). Likewise, Juvenal prompts his Pontia with the question "You killed two at dinner, you most savage viper? You slew two?" ("tune duos una, saevissima vipera, cena? tune duos?"), to which she replies, "seven, if there were by chance seven" ("septem, si septem forte fuissent"). Pontia herself speaks in ordinary Latin, without any language particularly characteristic of tragedy, though the events she describes are similar to those found in works of tragedy. According to the classicist J. G. F. Powell, this stylistic discrepancy between the tragic content and ordinary language of Pontia's speech serves to emphasize the broader point Juvenal was trying to make, which is that real Roman women commit crimes just as heinous as those in myth, such as those of Medea. Martial, a 1st-century poet, mentions her in his epigrams, wherein he describes receiving gifts of food from her, which she describes as her "little mouthfuls," and he refuses to ingest or to send to anyone else.
