= Lamponia gens =

Ancient Italic family

The gens Lamponia was an obscure plebeian family at ancient Rome, known from only a few individuals. The most important was Marcus Lamponius, one of the leaders of the allies during the Social War.

== Members ==
This list includes abbreviated praenomina. For an explanation of this practice, see filiation.

- Marcus Lamponius, (Note: Aponius in Diodorus Siculus.) a native of Lucania, was one of the Italian commanders during the Social War. He defeated Publius Licinius Crassus, who was forced to retreat into Grumentum with considerable losses. He opposed Sulla during the Roman civil war of 82 BC, and prudently disappeared after the Battle of the Colline Gate together with many other persons fleeing the expected persecution.
- Marcus Lamponius, mentioned as the father of a Lamponius whose funerary monument is at Maratea in Lucania. The inscription is doubtful, and perhaps is intended to refer to the Lucanian general.
- Lamponius Verus, named in an inscription from Savaria in Pannonia Superior.
- Lamponius Verinus, named in an inscription from Savaria.

== See also ==
- List of Roman gentes

== Bibliography ==
- Lucius Annaeus Florus, Epitome de T. Livio Bellorum Omnium Annorum DCC (Epitome of Livy: All the Wars of Seven Hundred Years).
- Diodorus Siculus, Bibliotheca Historica (Library of History).
- Plutarchus, Lives of the Noble Greeks and Romans.
- Sextus Julius Frontinus, Strategemata (Stratagems).
- Appianus Alexandrinus (Appian), Bellum Civile (The Civil War).
- Eutropius, Breviarium Historiae Romanae (Abridgement of the History of Rome).
- Dictionary of Greek and Roman Biography and Mythology, William Smith, ed., Little, Brown and Company, Boston (1849).
- Theodor Mommsen et alii, Corpus Inscriptionum Latinarum (The Body of Latin Inscriptions, abbreviated "CIL"), Berlin-Brandenburgische Akademie der Wissenschaften (1853–present).
