= Porta Collina =

Landmark in ancient Rome

Coordinates: 41°54′26.42″N 12°29′55.37″E

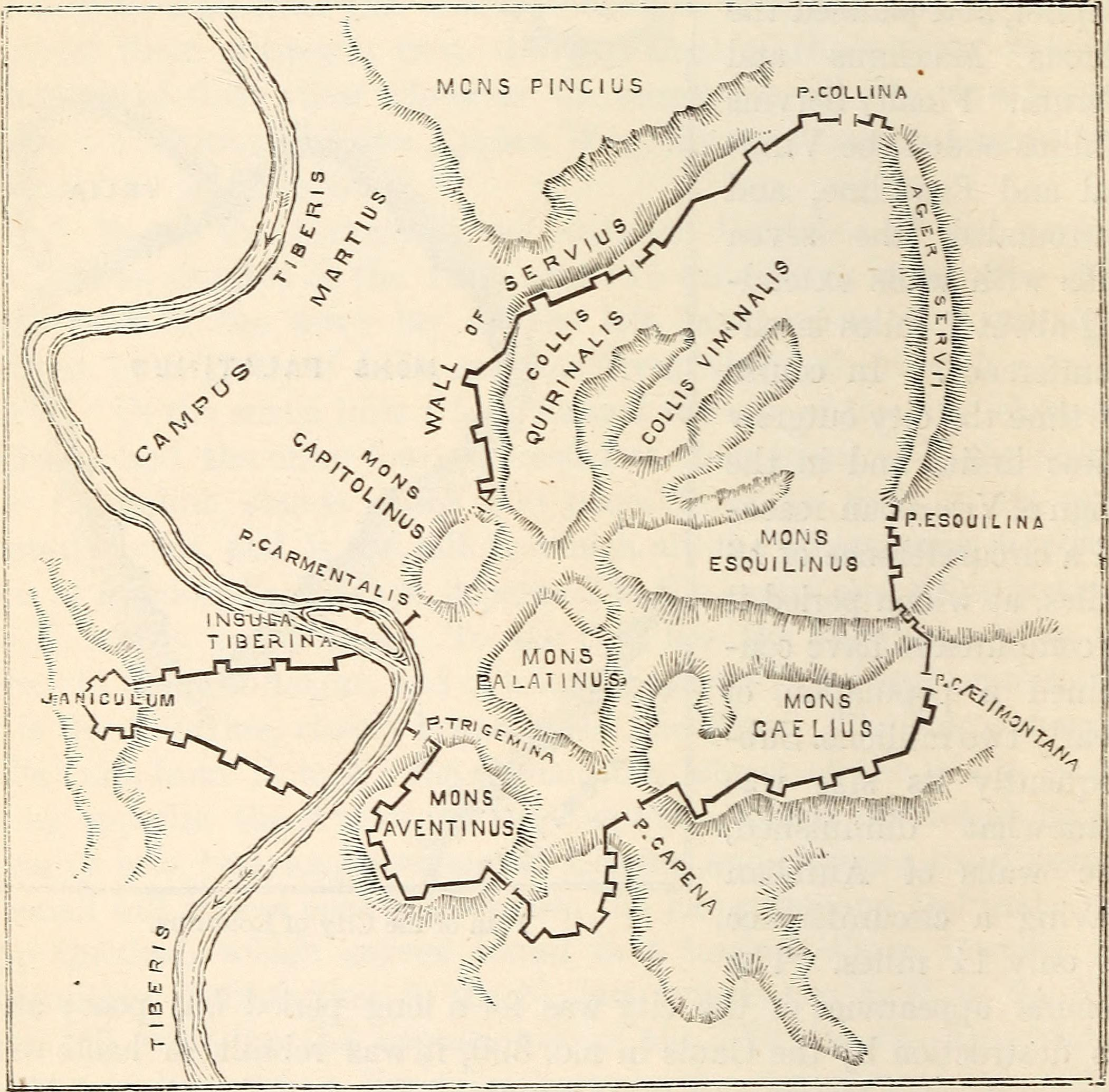
Map of ancient rome; Porta Collina at northeast

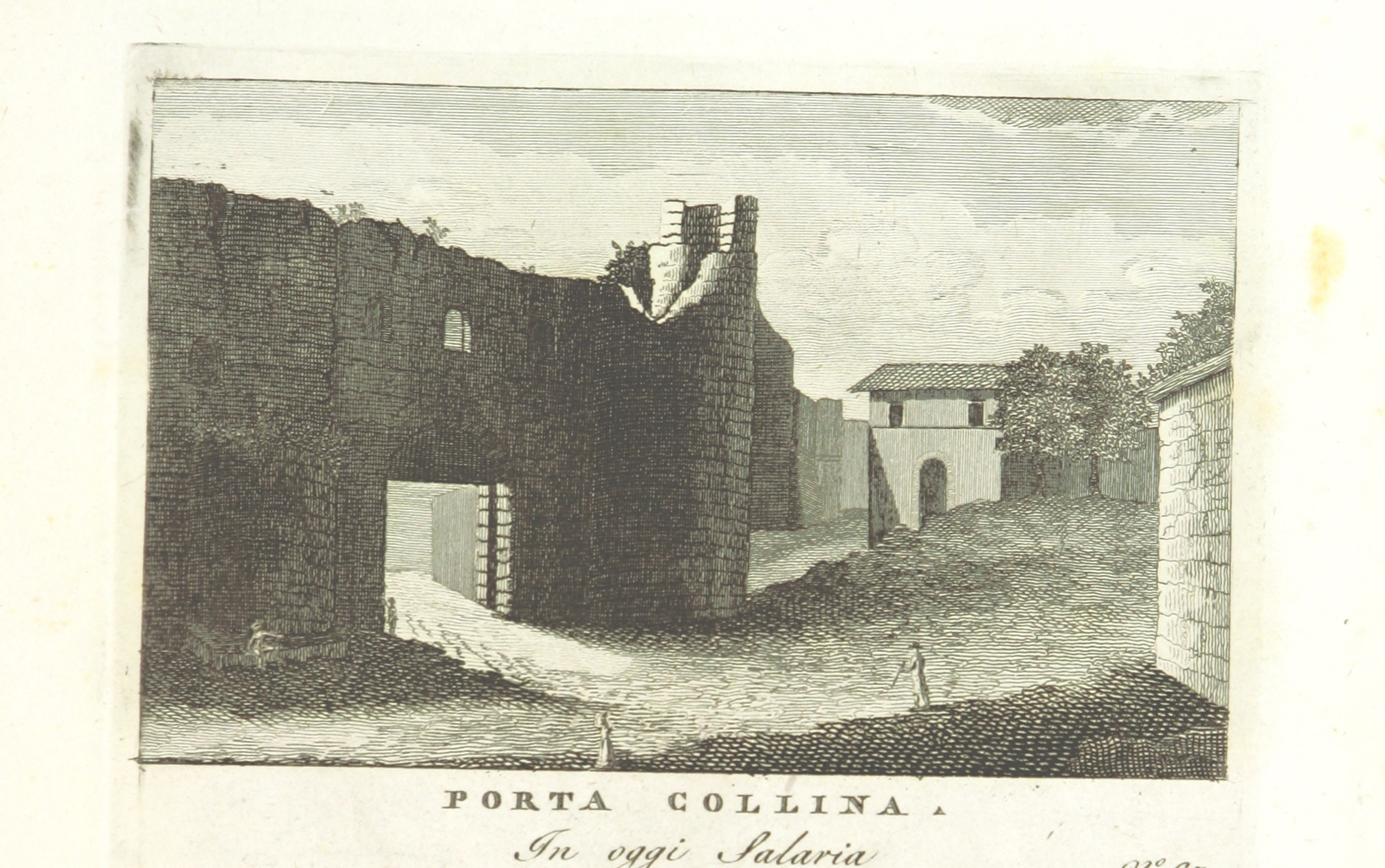
Porta Collina

The Colline Gate (Latin Porta Collina) was a landmark in ancient Rome, supposed to have been built by Servius Tullius, semi-legendary king of Rome 578–535 BC. The gate stood at the north end of the Servian Wall, and past it were two important streets, the Via Salaria and Via Nomentana. Within this area the Alta Semita linked the Quirinal with the Porta Carmentalis. Several temples were located near the gate, including temples of Venus Erycina and Fortuna. To a person facing the gate in the 4th century AD, the Gardens of Sallust would have been on the left, with the Baths of Diocletian on the right.

Plutarch says that, when a Vestal was punished for violating her vow of chastity, the subterranean chamber for her live burial was near the Colline Gate. The gate was the site of a decisive battle during the Roman civil wars of the 80s BC between the forces of Cinna and Sulla.
