= Pontius of Carthage =

3rd century Carthaginian Latin author and Christian saint

Saint Pontius the Deacon

Deacon, Hagiographer
- Born: early 3rd century Carthage
- Died: c. 262; Carthage
- Venerated in: Catholic Church; Eastern Orthodox Church; Oriental Orthodox Church
- Feast: March 8

Pontius, or Pontius the Deacon, (died in the mid-third century) was a Christian saint and Latin author from Carthage. He served as a deacon under Cyprian of Carthage (c. 200 –258) and wrote the Vita Cypriani ("Life of Cyprian") shortly after Cyprian's death.

== Life ==
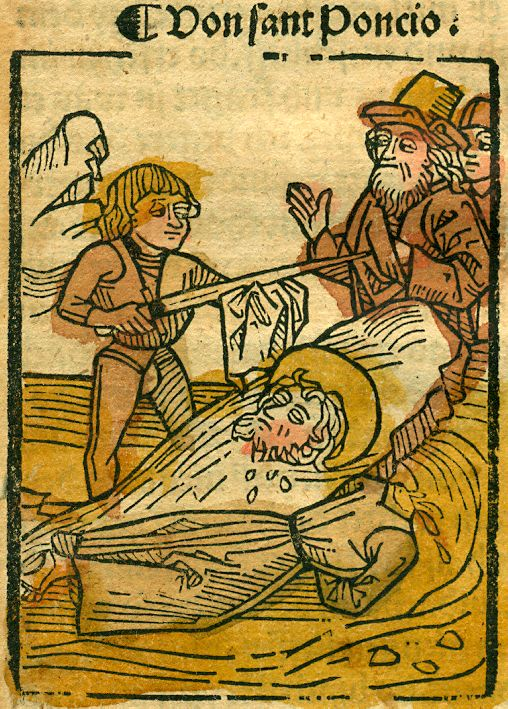
Fifteenth-century woodcut of Pontius witnessing the martyrdom of St. Cyprian

There is only one surviving account of Pontius, a brief mention in Jerome's De viris illustribus ("On famous men") 68:

Pontius, diaconus Cypriani, usque ad diem passionis eius cum ipso exsilium sustinens egregium volumen vitae et passionis Cypriani reliquit.
Pontius, Cyprian's deacon, who up to the day of his martyrdom endured exile with him, wrote a remarkable book of the life and passion of Cyprian.

Although the author is not identified in the transmitted Life of Cyprian, Jerome is clearly writing of this work. The only other information comes from the author's own statements: he writes in part from what he himself witnessed or heard from older people; he accompanied Cyprian into exile at Curubis, modern Korba. From the preface, it appears that Pontius was not aware of any other account of Cyprian's martyrdom at the time he wrote.

Beyond this, little is certain. Allusions and forensic style indicate that Pontius must have been well educated, with knowledge both of the Bible and of secular rhetoric. Hermann Dessau noted the coincidence of an inscription in the little town of Curubis to a local magistrate with the name Pontius and suggested that the praise of the town in the work and the author's desire to associate the town with Cyprian's martyrdom may reflect local patriotism. Other scholars either reject this or regard it as unprovable.

== Work ==
The manuscripts give the title of the work as Vita Cypriani ("The Life of Cyprian"), while Jerome (see above) referred to it as Vita et passio Cypriani ("Life and martyrdom of Cyprian"). Jerome's reference may not be intended as a title; but it is certainly the case that the book is clearly divided into two parts, one concerned with Cyprian's life, one with the events leading up to his martyrdom. In the preface to the work, Pontius expresses regret there were detailed accounts of the martyrdoms of lay Christians, but none of a bishop like Cyprian who had so much worth narrating even without the martyrdom (1, 2). Chapters 3 to 10 relate Cyprian's activities from the time of his conversion, while chapters 11-19 describe proceedings before two different proconsuls, their judgements and Cyprian's final martyrdom.

Although Pontius knew Cyprian personally, many have been disappointed in the lack of detailed information in the book. In part this is a result of Pontius' tendency merely to allude to matters he expected his audience to know. Alongside a small number of elements from experience, such as the prophetic dream that Cyprian had on being exiled to Curubis in AD 257 (Pont. 12–13), Pontius used Cyprian's own writings and an account of the proconsul's hearing in that year: a protocol of this was circulating even in Cyprian's lifetime and would form part of a later account of his martyrdom, known as the Acta Proconsularia. Pontius refers to this protocol (perhaps also to that of the second hearing in AD 258) and gives a looser and less detailed account. Another influence is the Passio sanctarum Perpetuae et Felicitatis, an earlier account of Carthaginian martyrs, which motivates his decision to write not just a passion but also an account of Cyprian's life.

Cyprian had been a controversial figure in his lifetime; and even after his death Pontius felt the need to react to some of the criticism he received. The life takes on a particularly apologetic character in its treatment of Cyprian's election to bishop, which some Carthaginians contested (5, 6) and of Cyprian's decision to go into hiding during the Decian persecution of AD 250, rather than undergo martyrdom (7-8).

Adolf von Harnack thought that although the biography cannot have been written immediately after Cyprian's death, the final chapter and others give the impression that Cyprian's martyrdom was very recent and so attributes the work to AD 259. Others prefer a slightly later date, when most of Pontius' audience would have known Cyprian from his work rather than personally.

== Literature ==
There are critical editions in Hartel (1871) xc–cx, Harnack (1913) taken from Hartel, Pellegrino (1955) and A.A.R. Bastiaensen in Mohrmann (1975), 1-48. Bastiaensen in Mohrmann (1975), 278–9, and Schmidt (1997) provide bibliographies. Harnack (1913), Pellegrino (1955) and Bastiaensen in Mohrmann (1975), 249–77 provide commentaries.

- Dessau, H. (1916) "Pontius der Biograph Cyprians" Hermes 51, 65–72
- Dessau, H. (1918) "Das Alter der römischen Municipalbeamten" Hermes 53, 221–4.
- Harnack, A. (1913) Das Leben Cyprians von Pontius (Leipzig: J. C. Hinrichs'sche Buchhandlung)
- Hartel, G. (=W.) (1871) S. Thasci Caecili Cypriani Opera Omnia Vol. 3 (Vienna: CSEL)
- Mohrmann, C. (1975) Vita di Cipriano, Vita di Ambrogio, Vita di Agostino (Milan: Mondadori) ISBN 88-04-12191-2
- Pellegrino, M. (1955) Vita e martirio di San Cipriano (Alba: 1955)
- Saxer, V. (1994) "Afrique Latin" 25–95 in G. Philippart (ed.) Hagiographies vol. 1 (Turnhout: Brepols) ISBN 2-503-50408-6
- Schmidt, P. L. (1997) "Pontius, Vita Cypriani" 433-5 (§472.10) in K. Sallmann (ed.) Die Literatur des Umbruchs von den römischen zur christlichen Literatur 117 bis 284 n. Chr. (Munich: Beck, vol. IV of the Handbuch der lateinischen Literatur der Antike ed. R. Herzog and P. L. Schmidt) ISBN 3-406-39020-X
