= Trebulana gens =

Ancient Roman family

The gens Trebulana, occasionally spelled Treblana, was an obscure plebeian family at ancient Rome. No members of this gens are mentioned by Roman writers, but several are known from inscriptions, and at least one attained high office under the early Empire, as Publius Trebulanus was praetor urbanus in AD 30.

== Origin ==
The nomen Trebulanus belongs to a class of gentilicia formed using the suffixes -anus or -anius, usually derived from the names of places ending in -as or -atis, or from cognomina ending in -anus, which also are typically derived from place-names. Trebulanus is derived from a place called "Trebula", perhaps Trebula in Campania, the inhabitants of which were granted Roman citizenship in 303 BC, although there were also two Sabine towns of the same name, distinguished as Trebula Mutusca and Trebula Suffenas, whose citizens were likewise known as Trebulani. Some of the inscriptions of this gens come from Trebula Suffenas.

== Praenomina ==
The main praenomina of the Trebulani were Titus, Marcus, Lucius, and Gaius, each among the most abundant names throughout Roman history. A few of the Trebulani bore other common names, including Publius, Quintus, and Sextus.

== Members ==
This list includes abbreviated praenomina. For an explanation of this practice, see filiation.

- Quintus Trebulanus, a magister of some uncertain group, (Note: By itself, magister could mean a schoolmaster; but it could also refer to a political leader, or the leader of an order or guild.) mentioned in a sepulchral inscription from Marruvium in Samnium, dating from the late first century BC.
- Lucius Treblanus C. f., buried at Rome, in a tomb dating from the late first century BC, or early first century AD.
- Marcus Trebulanus Faustus, the freedman of Marcus Trebulanus Philomusus, together with the freedwoman Deciria Lais, built a family sepulchre at Casilinum in Campania, dating from the late first century BC or the early first century AD for themselves, Philomusus, the freedwoman Deciria Secunda, Marcus Trebulanus Primigenius, and others.
- Marcus Trebulanus Philomusus, the former master of Marcus Trebulanus Faustus, who together with the freedwoman Deciria Lais, built a family sepulchre at Casilinum for themselves, Philomusus, and others, dating from the late first century BC or the early first century AD.
- Marcus Trebulanus Primigenius, buried at Casilinum, in a tomb built by the freedman Marcus Trebulanus Philomusus and the freedwoman Deciria Lais for themselves, Primigenius, and others, dating from the late first century BC or the early first century AD.
- Lucius Treblanus L. l. Acastus, a freedman buried at Aquileia in Venetia and Histria, in an Augustan-era tomb built by his daughter, the freedwoman Grata Plotia.
- Titus Trebulanus T. l., a freedman named in an inscription from Trebula Suffenas in Samnium, dating from AD 14, along with Titus Trebulanus Felix, and a group of freedmen including Titus Trebulanus Demetrius and Trebulanus Antiochus.
- Trebulanus M. l. Antiochus, a freedman named in an inscription from Trebula Suffenas, dating from AD 14, along with Titus Trebulanus Felix, and a group of freedmen including Titus Trebulanus Demetrius and another Titus Trebulanus.
- Trebulanus T. l. Demetrius, a freedman named in an inscription from Trebula Suffenas, dating from AD 14, along with Titus Trebulanus Felix, and a group of freedmen including Titus Trebulanus Antiochus and another Titus Trebulanus.
- Titus Trebulanus Felix, mentioned in an inscription from Trebula Suffenas, dating from AD 14, along with a group of freedmen including Titus Trebulanus Demetrius, another Titus Trebulanus, and Trebulanus Antiochus.
- Titus Treblanus Merzana, buried at Rome, in a tomb dating from the first half of the first century.
- Trebulana Modesta, buried at Beneventum in Samnium, in a tomb dating from the first half of the first century, built by Lucius Pupius Primigenius, a restio, or rope-maker, probably her husband.
- Publius Trebulanus, praetor urbanus in AD 30, during the reign of Tiberius.
- Trebulanus Caesaris, dedicated a first-century sepulchre at Rome for his wife, Carvilia Xenice, house-slave, Carvilia Venusta, and Athenais, perhaps the slave of Julius Plutus.
- Titus Trebulanus T. l. Nepos Herculaneus, a freedman, was one of the Seviri Augustales at Tibur in Latium, the husband of Publicia Saturnina, and father of Titus Trebulanus Nepos Herculaneus, who followed his father as a priest of Augustus, according to a first- or early second-century inscription.
- Titus Trebulanus T. f. Nepos Herculaneus, son of the freedman Titus Trebulanus Nepos Herculaneus and Publicia Saturnina, was one of the Seviri Augustales at Tibur, like his father, according to a first- or early second-century inscription.
- Marcus Trebulanus, named in a second-century sepulchral inscription from Rome, along with Titus Trebulanus Felix, Lucius Trebulanus Pamphilio, and others.
- Titus Trebulanus Felix, named in a second-century sepulchral inscription from Rome, along with Lucius Tribulanus Pamphilio, Marcus Trebulanus, and others.
- Lucius Tribulanus Pamphilio, named in a second-century sepulchral inscription from Rome, along with Titus Trebulanus Felix, Marcus Trebulanus, and others.
- Trebulana Justina, made an offering to Attis and Minerva at Beneventum on the eleventh day before the Kalends of August, (Note: July 22, by modern reckoning.) in AD 228.

=== Undated Trebulani ===
- Treblanus C. f., named in an inscription from Pola in Venetia and Histria.
- Lucius Treblanus Sex. f., buried in the family sepulchre of Lucius Treblanus Cilo at Pola.
- Titus Treblanus, buried in the family sepulchre of Lucius Treblanus Cilo at Pola.
- Titus Trebulanus Albanus, a freedman of the city of Trebula Suffenas, as was Trebulanus Ferentinensis, mentioned in the same inscription.
- Lucius Treblanus C. f. Cilo, one of the municipal duumvirs and aediles, and probably the builder a family sepulchre at Pola, where Lucius Treblanus, Carvilia Maxima, Titus Treblanus, Sextus Flavonius Bassus, Pomponia, and Treblana Paulla are buried.
- Trebulanus Ferentinensis, a freedman of the city of Trebula Suffenas, along with Titus Trebulanus Albanus. From his surname, he was a native of Ferentinum in Latium.
- Treblana Paulla, buried in the family sepulchre of Lucius Treblanus Cilo at Pola.
- Gaius Treblanus Paullus, (Note: Due to the condition of the inscription, the reading of this name is uncertain.), named in an inscription from Pola.
- Marcus Trebulanus Gagilius Telesforianus, a boy buried at Beneventum, aged nine years, six months, and twelve days, in a tomb built by his parents, Trebulanus Telesforus and Natria Gagilia.
- Trebulanus Telesforus, together with his wife, Natria Gagilia, dedicated a tomb Beneventum for their son, Marcus Trebulanus Gagilius Telesforianus.

== See also ==
- List of Roman gentes

== Bibliography ==
- Theodor Mommsen et alii, Corpus Inscriptionum Latinarum (The Body of Latin Inscriptions, abbreviated CIL), Berlin-Brandenburgische Akademie der Wissenschaften (1853–present).
- Dictionary of Greek and Roman Geography, William Smith, ed., Little, Brown and Company, Boston (1854).
- Notizie degli Scavi di Antichità (News of Excavations from Antiquity, abbreviated NSA), Accademia dei Lincei (1876–present).
- René Cagnat et alii, L'Année épigraphique (The Year in Epigraphy, abbreviated AE), Presses Universitaires de France (1888–present).
- George Davis Chase, "The Origin of Roman Praenomina", in Harvard Studies in Classical Philology, vol. VIII, pp. 103–184 (1897).
- Inscriptiones Italiae (Inscriptions from Italy), Rome (1931-present).
- Gian Luca Gregori, "Regiones Italiae VI–XI", in Epigrafia Anfiteatrale dell'Occidente Romano, Roma (1989).
