= Semonia =

In Roman mythology, Semonia was the goddess of sowing. She belonged to a group of agricultural deities which also comprised Setia (or Seja) and Segetia. Their names are derived from the same stem as the Latin verb sero "to sow".

This ancient deity, associated with crops and sowing, is of possible Roman or Sabine origin and worship. She is usually attested with the epithet Salus Semonia.

Her possible male counterpart is Sabine god Semo Sancus, whose traits merged with Dius Fidius's.

Semonia and Sancus appear together with other agricultural/crop deities Seia and Segetia.
