= Santa Vittoria, Monteleone Sabino =

Roman Catholic church in Lazio, Italy

Coordinates: 42.2258°N 12.8706°E

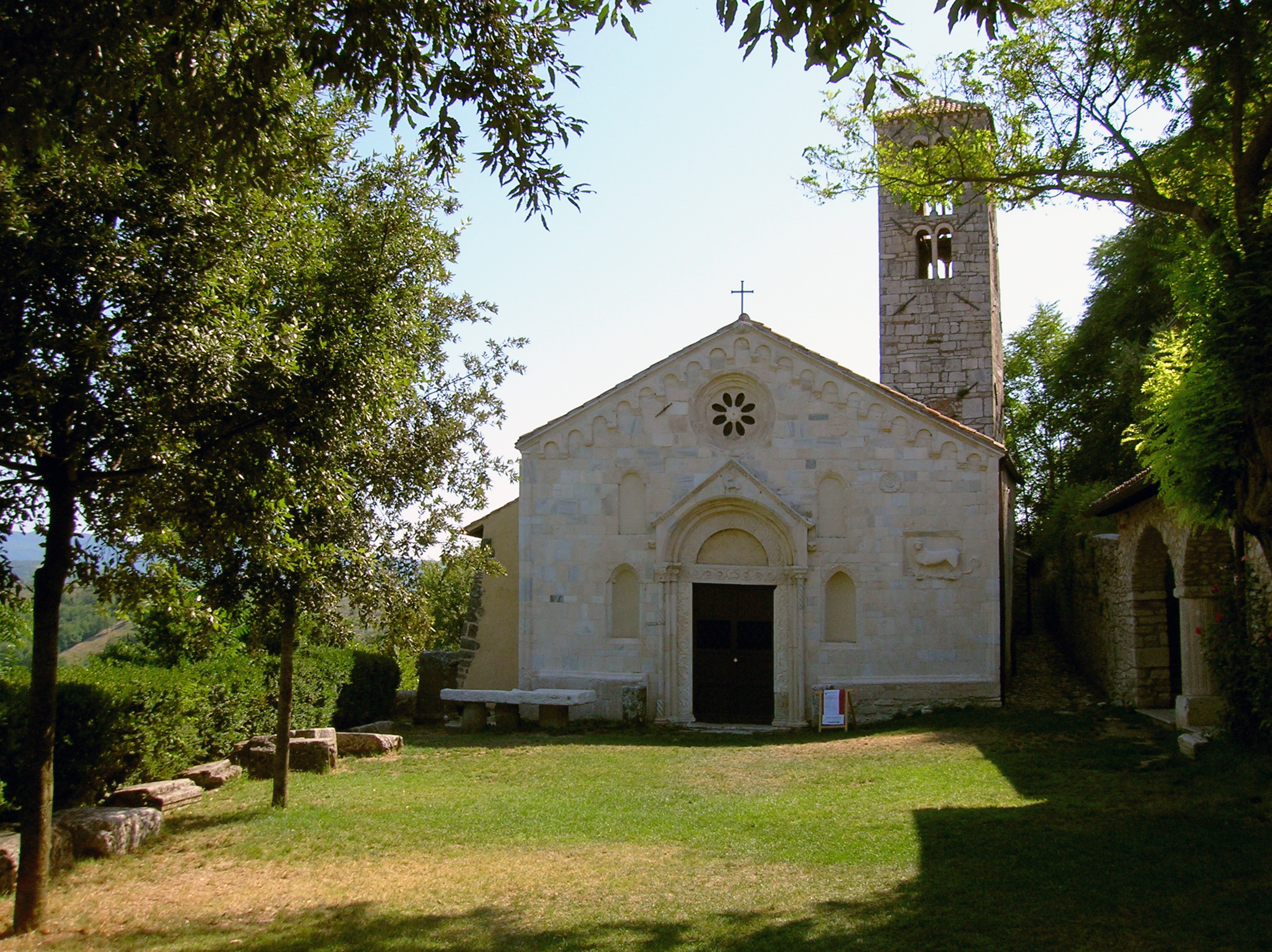
Sanctuary of Santa Vittoria

Santa Vittoria (Saint Victoria) is a Romanesque-style, Roman Catholic church located outside of the town of Monteleone Sabino, on the road to Rocca Sinibalda, in the province of Rieti, region of Lazio, Italy.

== History ==
The church appears built using material from prior Ancient Roman buildings, perhaps a local villa or the nearby ancient town of Trebula Mutusca, and the walls contain spolia with inscriptions and depictions of a lion and solar-face. Strewn around the church are other remains of ancient buildings. including column fragments. The structure dates to at least the 11th-century. The pale facade has an elegant rosette, and roof-line. The church has three naves, but the lateral walls derive from later reconstructions. The bell-tower, made of asymmetric stone bricks, and facade date to after the 15th-century under the patronage of the Orsini family. The nave is lower than the surrounding ground, and leads to crypts used for medieval burials. Putatively, the site once held the relics of Santa Vittoria, but these appeared to have been dispersed during the various Saracen raids.
