= Pantuleia gens =

Ancient Roman family

The gens Pantuleia, occasionally written Patuleia, was an obscure plebeian family at ancient Rome. Members of this gens are first mentioned during the first century of the Empire. According to Tacitus, at least some of the Pantuleii were of equestrian rank, but few of them achieved any of the higher offices of the Roman state.

== Origin ==
Pantuleius belongs to a large class of nomina formed using the gentile-forming suffix -eius. Such names were typically, although not exclusively, of Oscan derivation, suggesting that the family may have been of Sabine or Samnite origin. Such an origin is supported by the surname Sabinus, belonging to one of the family, and while a number of Pantuleii are known from inscriptions found in Latium, several are mentioned in an inscription from the Sabine city of Trebula Mutusca.

== Praenomina ==
Most of the Pantuleii known from inscriptions bore the praenomina Gaius, Lucius, or Marcus, which were the three most common names throughout Roman history. The only other name of which there is an example in this gens was Aulus, also a common praenomen.

== Members ==
This list includes abbreviated praenomina. For an explanation of this practice, see filiation.

- Pantuleius, (Note: In some manuscripts Patuleius.) a wealthy eques who died in AD 17, during the reign of Tiberius, bequeathing his property to the emperor. Tiberius learned that the legacy had previously been willed to Marcus Servilius, and granted it to him.
- Aulus Pantuleius, a sculptor who lived in Greece during the reign of Hadrian. He made a statue of the emperor for the people of Miletus.
- Gaius Pantuleius C. f. Justus, the father of Gaius Pantuleius Graptiacus. His wife was probably Claudia Magna.
- Gaius Pantuleius C. f. C. n. Graptiacus, legatus pro praetore (Note: A legate appointed by the emperor, usually the governor of one of the major imperial provinces, although some persons of this rank had no fixed province. The lesser imperial provinces were governed by praefects or procurators. Senatorial provinces were governed by proconsuls or propraetors.) of Thracia in AD 172.
- Pantuleia, named in an inscription from Tarracina.
- Pantuleia, buried at Ostia.
- Patuleia L. f., named in an inscription from Praeneste.
- Gaius Pantuleius Anatellon, together with Marcus Ulpius Successus, one of the heirs of Ulpia Theodos, to whom they dedicated a monument at Nemausus in Gallia Narbonensis.
- Lucius Patuleius, the father of Patuleia.
- Pantuleia Arbuscula, buried at Rome.
- Marcus Patuleius Atimetus, named in an inscription from Trebula Mutusca.
- Patuleia Aucta, named in an inscription from Rome.
- Gaius Pantuleius Bolus, named in a funerary inscription from Rome.
- Gaius Pantuleius Carpophorus, named in an inscription from Nemausus.
- Lucius Pantuleius Chryseros, one of the municipal officials at Ostia in AD 196.
- Marcus Patuleius Crescens, named in an inscription from Trebula Mutusca.
- Gaius Pantuleius C. l. Epigonus, named in an inscription from Fundi in Latium.
- Patuleia Hygia, buried at Rome.
- Pantuleia C. l. Ionis, a freedwoman, buried at Fundi, with a monument dedicated by Gaius Pantuleius Onesimus.
- Gaius Pantuleius Onesimus, dedicated a monument at Fundi to Pantuleia Ionis.
- Marcus Patuleius Sabinus, named in an inscription from Trebula Mutusca.
- Gaius Pantuleius Sotericus, dedicated a monument at Rome to his son, Victorinus.
- Lucius Pantuleius Thaumastus, one of the municipal officials at Ostia in AD 196.
- Pantuleius C. f. Victorinus, the son of Sotericus, buried at Rome, aged two.

== See also ==
- List of Roman gentes

== Bibliography ==
- Publius Cornelius Tacitus, Annales.
- August Böckh et alii, Corpus Inscriptionum Graecarum (The Body of Greek Inscriptions), Königliche Akademie der Wissenschaften (1828–1877).
- Theodor Mommsen et alii, Corpus Inscriptionum Latinarum (The Body of Latin Inscriptions, abbreviated CIL), Berlin-Brandenburgische Akademie der Wissenschaften (1853–present).
- René Cagnat et alii, L'Année épigraphique (The Year in Epigraphy, abbreviated AE), Presses Universitaires de France (1888–present).
- George Davis Chase, "The Origin of Roman Praenomina", in Harvard Studies in Classical Philology, vol. VIII (1897).
- Paul von Rohden, Elimar Klebs, & Hermann Dessau, Prosopographia Imperii Romani (The Prosopography of the Roman Empire, abbreviated PIR), Berlin (1898).
- Manfred Clauss, Anne Kolb, & Wolfgang A. Slaby, Epigraphik Datenbank Clauss/Slaby (abbreviated EDCS).
