= Sabellian =

Sabellian can refer to

- Sabellian, a believer in Sabellianism, the nontrinitarian belief that the Father, Son and Holy Spirit are different modes or aspects of one God, rather than three distinct persons in God Himself
- Sabellian languages, another name for the Osco-Umbrian languages
- Sabellians a collective ethnonym for a group of Italic peoples or tribes inhabiting central Italy at the time of the rise of Rome
