= Safinia gens =

The gens Safinia was a minor plebeian family at ancient Rome. Few members of this gens are mentioned in history, but a number are known from inscriptions.

== Origin ==
The nomen Safinius belongs to a class of gentilicia formed from cognomina ending in -inus. The root of the name is Safineis, cognate with the Latin Sabinus, the Oscan name for the Sabellic peoples, including the Sabines and Samnites.

== Praenomina ==
The chief praenomina of the Safinii were Lucius, Gaius, and Marcus, the three most common names throughout all periods of Roman history. Other common praenomina were occasionally used, including Publius, Quintus, and Titus. Septimus appears in a filiation. It was quite rare as a praenomen, but a fairly common surname, in which form might have been used in the filiation instead of a praenomen.

== Branches and cognomina ==
The Safinii of imperial times used a wide variety of personal cognomina, but a number of this gens bore the surname Rufus, or its diminutive, Rufinus, originally given to someone with red hair. At least some of these probably constituted a distinct family of the Safinii. Other surnames that might have represented stirpes of the Safinii include Sabellio, belonging to a class of surnames derived from the names of peoples and places, undoubtedly alluding to the Sabellic origin of the gens, and the meaning of its nomen gentilicium; and perhaps Primus, together with its diminutive, Primilla, a name usually signifying the eldest son in a family, although this name might have belonged to otherwise unrelated Safinii, as at least some bearing this name appear to have been freedmen.

== Members ==
This list includes abbreviated praenomina. For an explanation of this practice, see filiation.

- Safinius Atella, a beneficiary of the bribery of Staienus, who also bribed the judges during the trial of Cluentius.
- Lucius Safinius, named in an inscription from Aquileia in Venetia and Histria, dating to the early or middle first century BC.
- Lucius Safinius L. f. Sabellio, named in an inscription from Aquileia, dating to the third quarter of the first century BC.
- Safinia L. f., the mother of Caesia Rufa, and mother-in-law of Lucius Annelius Rufus, one of the duumviri jure dicundo at Cassanum in Bruttium, between 50 BC and the death of Augustus.
- Lucius Safinius L. l. Hilarus, a freedman named in an inscription from Puteoli in Campania, dating to AD 1.
- Quintus Safinius, named in an inscription from Lenola, Lazio, dating between the era of Augustus and AD 30.
- Safinia Ɔ. l. Agathemeris, a freedwoman, and the wife of Lucius Tampius Acutus, named in an inscription from Rome, dating to the first half of the first century AD.
- Safinia Ɔ. l. Prima, a freedwoman named in an inscription from Suasa in Umbria, dating to the reign of Tiberius.
- Lucius Safinius L. l. Epigonus, a freedman buried at Ephesus in Asia, in the first half of the first century AD.
- Lucius Safinius L. f. Fuscus, built a tomb at Altinum in Venetia and Histria for himself and his wife, Maria Prima, dating between AD 30 and 70.
- Safinia Anesia, named in a first-century inscription from Rome.
- Safinia Hilara, named in a first-century inscription from Rome.
- Gaius Safinius Ce[...], one of the duumviri jure dicundo at Aquinum in Latium in AD 75.
- Safinia Justina, the wife of Cosconius Secundinus, mother of Gratus Secundinus and Justinus, grandmother of Secundinus Gratus Justus and Heuresis, named in a second-century dedicatory inscription from Ameria in Umbria.
- Gaius Safinius C. f. Primus, a native of Trebula, was a soldier in the fourteenth urban cohort at Rome in AD 197, serving in the century of Heliodorus.

=== Undated Safinii ===
- Safinia, the slave of Procnus, and wife of Atticus, a slave belonging to Publius Aufidius Longus, was buried with her husband at Iader in Dalmatia, in a tomb built by Atticus' brother, the freedman Publius Aufidius Eros.
- Safinius, named in an inscription from Rome.
- Safinius, named in an inscription from Ephesus.
- Lucius Safinius, the master of Nicomachus, a slave named in an inscription from Alba Fucens in Samnium.
- Marcus Safinius, the master of Clymenus, a slave named in an inscription from Saena in Etruria.
- Marcus Safinius Sex. (f.?), buried at Placentia in Umbria.
- Safinia Amaryllis, buried at Rome, aged twenty-five.
- Gaius Safinius Agricola, named in an inscription from Ravenna in Etruria.
- Lucius Safinius L. l. Antigonus, buried at Rome, aged ninety-four, with a monument from another freedman, Annius.
- Marcus Safinius Ɔ. l. Apollonius, a freedman named in an inscription from Rome.
- Marcus Safinius Ɔ. l. Ascla, a freedman named in an inscription from Rome.
- Safinia Attice, the wife of Lucius Publicius Montanus, a litter-bearer at the Porta Fontinalia in Rome, was buried at Rome, aged twenty-four.
- Safinia Calliste, dedicated a tomb at Ostia in Latium to her son, Publius Cornelius Artemidorus.
- Gaius Safinius Ɔ. l. Euanthus, a freedman buried at Rome, aged twenty-five.
- Lucius Safinius L. l. Faustus, a freedman named in an inscription from Rome.
- Safinia Q. f. Festa, named in an inscription from Ceneta in Venetia and Histria.
- Publius Safinius Filucinus, son of the priestess Terentia, named in a dedicatory inscription to the Magna Mater at Salona in Dalmatia.
- Publius Safinius C. f. Gratus, a scout buried at Rome, aged twenty-two.
- Safinia Hospita, buried at Ravenna, with a monument from her daughter, Panentia Placida.
- Safinia L. l. Jucunda, a freedwoman named in an inscription from Rome, together with Lucius Safinius Romanus.
- Gaius Safinius C. f. Labeo, named in a funerary inscription from Narbo in Gallia Narbonensis, together with Cervia Tertia.
- Safinia C. Cinciae l. Lampyris, a freedwoman, along with Gaius Safinius Nicephorus, was given a pot by Titus Cincius Faustus at Rome.
- Gaius Safinius C. l. Nicephorus, a freedman, along with Safinia Lampyris, was given a pot by Titus Cincius Faustus at Rome.
- Marcus Safinius Onomastus, buried at Rome, with a monument from his client, Safinia Primilla.
- Marcus Safinius M. l. Philocles, a freedman buried at Rome.
- Marcus Safinius Philocles, the heir of Marcus Cronius Erolis, was given two pots by Quintus Caecilius Faustus at Rome.
- Safinia Pice, named in two inscriptions from Carthage in Africa Proconsularis.
- Safinia Picens, named in an inscription from Suasa in Umbria.
- Titus Safinius T. f. Pollio, an architect, built a house at Casilinum in Campania for Publius Confuleius Sabbio.
- Safinia Primilla, built a monument at Rome for her patron, Marcus Safinius Onomastus.
- Marcus Safinius Primus, probably a freedman, together with his wife, Safinia Thalassa, dedicated a monument at Rome to their son, Marcus Safinius Thalassus.
- Lucius Safinius Probus, buried at Rome, aged thirty-five.
- Lucius Safinius Quartus, named in an inscription from Arausio in Gallia Narbonensis.
- Lucius Safinius Quartus, one of the Seviri Mercuriales at Narona in Dalmatia.
- Gaius Safinius Regillus, one of the duumviri jure dicundo at Ferentinum in Latium.
- Lucius Safinius L. l. Romanus, a freedman named in an inscription from Rome, together with Safinia Jucunda.
- Marcus Safinius Rufinus, buried at Castellum Tidditanorum in Numidia, aged forty.
- Gaius Safinius L. f. Rufus, buried in a family sepulchre at Verona in Venetia and Histria, together with his mother, Octavia, wife, Calpurnia Festa, and son, Lucius Safinius Rufus.
- Lucius Safinius C. f. L. n. Rufus, buried in a family sepulchre at Verona, together with his parents, Gaius Safinius Rufus and Calpurnia Festa, and grandmother, Octavia.
- Publius Safinius M. f. Rufus, named in an inscription from Rome.
- Titus Safinius Sept. f. Rufus, buried at Asseria in Dalmatia, together with his mother, Clodia Aeta, and sister, Safinia Secunda.
- Lucius Safinius L. f. Sabellio, named in an inscription from Aquileia.
- Safinius Schedus, dedicated a monument at Rome to his mother.
- Safinia Sept. f. Secunda, buried at Asseria, together with her mother, Clodia Aeta, and brother, Titus Safinius Rufus.
- Lucius Safinius Secundio, named in an inscription from Rome.
- Lucius Safinius L. l. Stabilis, a freedman named in a funerary inscription from Rome.
- Lucius Safinius Ɔ. l. Surus, a freedman buried at Rome.
- Safinia Thalassa, probably a freedwoman, together with her husband, Marcus Safinius Primus, dedicated a monument at Rome to their son, Marcus Safinius Thalassus.
- Marcus Safinius M. f. Thalassus, the son of Marcus Safinius Primus and Safinia Thalassa, buried at Rome, aged four years, eight months.
- Safinia Tigris, buried at Hispellum in Umbria, with a monument from her husband, Cornelius Severinus.

== See also ==
- List of Roman gentes

== Bibliography ==
- Marcus Tullius Cicero, Pro Cluentio.
- Theodor Mommsen et alii, Corpus Inscriptionum Latinarum (The Body of Latin Inscriptions, abbreviated CIL), Berlin-Brandenburgische Akademie der Wissenschaften (1853–present).
- Notizie degli Scavi di Antichità (News of Excavations from Antiquity, abbreviated NSA), Accademia dei Lincei (1876–present).
- Bulletin Archéologique du Comité des Travaux Historiques et Scientifiques (Archaeological Bulletin of the Committee on Historic and Scientific Works, abbreviated BCTH), Imprimerie Nationale, Paris (1885–1973).
- René Cagnat et alii, L'Année épigraphique (The Year in Epigraphy, abbreviated AE), Presses Universitaires de France (1888–present).
- George Davis Chase, "The Origin of Roman Praenomina", in Harvard Studies in Classical Philology, vol. VIII, pp. 103–184 (1897).
- Stéphane Gsell, Inscriptions Latines de L'Algérie (Latin Inscriptions from Algeria, abbreviated ILAlg), Edouard Champion, Paris (1922–present).
- Inschriften Griechischer Städte aus Kleinasien (Inscriptions from the Greek Cities of Asia Minor, abbreviated IK), Bonn (1973–present).
- Archeologia Veneta, Società Archaeologica Veneta, Padua (1978–present).
