= Urseia gens =

Ancient Roman family

The gens Urseia or Ursia was an obscure plebeian family at ancient Rome. The only member of this gens known from Roman literature is the first-century jurist Urseius Ferox, but a few others are known from inscriptions.

== Origin ==
The nomen Urseius belongs to a large class of gentilicia formed using the suffix -eius, commonly associated with names of Oscan origin, but which came to be regarded as a regular gentile-forming suffix. Names of this type were often interchangeable with the more regular Latin ending -ius, and accordingly a number of inscriptions are found under Ursius. The nomen was derived from ursus, a bear.

== Praenomina ==
The Urseii used a variety of praenomina common throughout Roman history, particularly Lucius, Publius, Marcus, and Gaius, with additional instances of Aulus, Quintus, Sextus, and Titus.

== Members ==
This list includes abbreviated praenomina. For an explanation of this practice, see filiation.

- Lucius Ursius A. f., one of the aediles mentioned in a first-century BC inscription, along with Marcus Nellius and Aulus Octavius, who built a wall, gate, and tower at Fundi in Latium, pursuant to a decree of the senate.
- Ursia T. f. Rufa, named in an inscription from Trebula Suffenas in Sabinum, dating from the latter half of the first century BC.
- Marcus Ursius M. f., made a large donation to Vesta at Beneventum in Campania, according to an inscription dating from the third quarter of the first century BC.
- Ursia A. f. Quarta, the wife of Aconius, and mother of Aulus Aconius, a freedman inurned at Perusia in Etruria during the late first century BC, was also inurned at Perusia in the latter half of the first century BC.
- Gaius Ursius Stabilio, the former master of Ursia Prima.
- Ursia C. l. Prima, the freedwoman of Gaius Ursius Stabilio, dedicated a tomb at Rome for her husband, Aulus Avidius Symmachus, aged thirty.
- Lucius Ursius Philetus, buried in a first-century tomb at Mediolanum in Cisalpine Gaul, built by his wife, Coelia Primula, for herself, her husband, and her son, Lucius Albucius Crescens.
- Gaius Ursius Virianus, named in a dedicatory inscription from the present site of Sesto Calende, formerly part of Cisalpine Gaul, dating from the first or second century.
- Quintus Ursius Secundius, mentioned in an inscription from Rome dating to AD 23.
- Marcus Urseius Rufus, mentioned in an inscription from Rome, dating to AD 30.
- Urseius Ferox, an influential jurist who lived during the middle portion of the first century. His works are lost, but formed the basis of four books by the jurist Salvius Julianus. He is quoted by Ulpian, and cited a number of times in the Digest.
- Ursia C. f. Sabellina, made an offering to the Bona Dea at Marruvium in Samnium, dating from the latter half of the first century.
- Ursia Fortunata, buried at Clusium in Etruria, in a tomb dedicated by her husband, Eufronius Felix, dating between the middle of the first century, and the middle of the second.
- Lucius Ursius Sosander, a vestiarius, a cloth merchant or tailor, had been one of the Seviri at Cremona, and was buried at Bononia in Cisalpine Gaul, along with his wife, Rufria Calybe, in a tomb dating between the middle of the first and the middle of the second century.
- Gaius Ursius Hermes, buried at Mediolanum, in a tomb dating between the middle of the first century, and the end of the second.
- Publius Ursius Sex. f. Pollio, buried at Mediolanum, together with his wife, Vettia Lepida, their son, Publius Ursius Paullus, and the freedman, Publius Ursius Elainus, in a tomb built by their daughter, Ursia Prisca, dating between the middle of the first century, and the end of the second.
- Publius Ursius P. f. Sex. n. Paullus, one of the Seviri at Mediolanum, and curator of the treasury, buried in a family sepulchre built by his older sister, Ursia Prisca, for her parents, Publius Ursius Pollio and Vettia Lepida, brother, and the freedman Publius Ursius Elainus, dating between the middle of the first century and the end of the second.
- Publius Ursius Elainus, a freedman buried at Mediolanum, in a family sepulchre built by Ursia Prisca for Elainus, her younger brother, Publius Ursius Paullus, and their parents, Publius Ursius Pollio and Vettia Lepida, dating between the middle of the first century and the end of the second.
- Ursia P. f. Sex. n. Prisca, dedicated a sepulchre at Mediolanum, dating between the middle of the first century and the end of the second, for her parents, Publius Ursius Pollio and Vettia Lepida, her younger brother, Publius Ursius Paullus, and the freedman Publius Ursius Elainus.
- Urseia Fortunata, a woman buried in a late first-century or early second-century sepulchre at Rome, built by Pallentina Pieris and her son-in-law, Quintus Caenius Pallans, for her daughter Pallentina Florentina, Urseia Fortunata, and their family.
- Urseia Procula, a young woman buried in a late first-century or early second-century tomb at Rome, aged sixteen.
- Ursia T. f. Vegeta, buried at Emerita in Lusitania, in a tomb dating from the late first or early second century, along with her husband, whose name has not been preserved.
- Ursia M. f. Marciana, the wife of Lucius Sulpicius, one of the quattuorviri and quaestor of the treasury, with whom she was buried at Bergomum in Cisalpine Gaul, in a tomb dedicated by their children, Lucius Sulpicius Marcianus and Sulpicia Germana, and dating from the first quarter of the second century.
- Ursia Myrine, wife of the freedman Lucius Sulpicius Eutychus, one of the Seviri, who built a tomb for himself and his wife at Burgomum, dating from the first half of the second century.
- Quintus Ursius Paederos, buried at Emerita, aged sixty, in a tomb built by his daughter, Ursia Verana, dating from the latter half of the second century.
- Ursia Q. f. Verana, dedicated a tomb at Emerita, dating from the latter half of the second century, for her father, Quintus Ursius Paederos, and another for her husband, Afranius Apollo, aged sixty.
- Marcus Ursius M. f. Secundus, a soldier in the Praetorian Guard, stationed at Rome in AD 180.
- Ursius Maturus, one of several men who helped to restore the temple of Bellona at Mogontiacum in Germania Superior, which had fallen in, according to an inscription from dating from AD 236.

=== Undated Urseii ===
- Publius Ursius, dedicated a tomb at Olisipo in Lusitania for his son, Publius Ursius Priscus.
- Publius Ursius, a native of Niceros, buried at Olisipo, in a sepulchre built by Ursia Fundana, also from Niceros, and Ursius Arrenus, possibly her son.
- Ursia Arethusa, named in an inscription from Emerita.
- Ursius Arrenus, possibly the son of Ursia Fundana, with whom he built a sepulchre at Olisipo for themselves and Publius Ursius.
- Lucius Ursius L. l. Boetus, a freedman, was a native of Asia, and was buried in the tomb of the Saufeii at Vardacate in Liguria.
- Gaius Ursius P. f. Clemens, butied at Olisipo, aged twenty-one.
- Ursia Dionysia, buried at Ameria in Umbria, aged thirty.
- Publius Ursius Felix, named in a sepulchral inscription from Rome.
- Ursia Fundana, a native of Niceros, along with Ursius Arrenus, perhaps her son, built a sepulchre at Olisipo for themselves and Publius Ursius, also a native of Niceros.
- Ursia L. l. Nice, a freedwoman buried at Rome, along with the freedman Lucius Ursius Pilemon.
- Lucius Ursius L. l. Pilemon, a freedman buried at Rome, along with the freedwoman Ursia Nice.
- Publius Ursius P. f. Priscus, buried at Olisipo in a tomb dedicated by his father, Publius Ursius.

== See also ==
- List of Roman gentes

== Bibliography ==
- Dictionary of Greek and Roman Biography and Mythology, William Smith, ed., Little, Brown and Company, Boston (1849).
- Theodor Mommsen et alii, Corpus Inscriptionum Latinarum (The Body of Latin Inscriptions, abbreviated CIL), Berlin-Brandenburgische Akademie der Wissenschaften (1853–present).
- René Cagnat et alii, L'Année épigraphique (The Year in Epigraphy, abbreviated AE), Presses Universitaires de France (1888–present).
- George Davis Chase, "The Origin of Roman Praenomina", in Harvard Studies in Classical Philology, vol. VIII, pp. 103–184 (1897).
- Paul von Rohden, Elimar Klebs, & Hermann Dessau, Prosopographia Imperii Romani (The Prosopography of the Roman Empire, abbreviated PIR), Berlin (1898).
- Luis García Iglesias, Epigrafía Romana de Augusta Emerita (Roman Epigraphy of Augusta Emerita), Madrid (1973).
- Hispania Epigraphica (Epigraphy of Spain), Madrid (1989–present).
- Antonio Sartori and Serena Zoia, Pietre che vivono: Catalogo delle epigrafi di età romana del civico museo archeologico di Milano (Living Stone: Catalog of Roman Epigraphy from the Civic Archaeological Museum of Milan), Faenza (2020).
