= Safinia =

Safinia may refer to:

- Farhad Safinia (born 1975), Iranian-American screenwriter, producer and director
- Safinia gens, a plebeian family in ancient Rome
