= Monteleone Sabino =

- Comune
- Comune di Monteleone Sabino
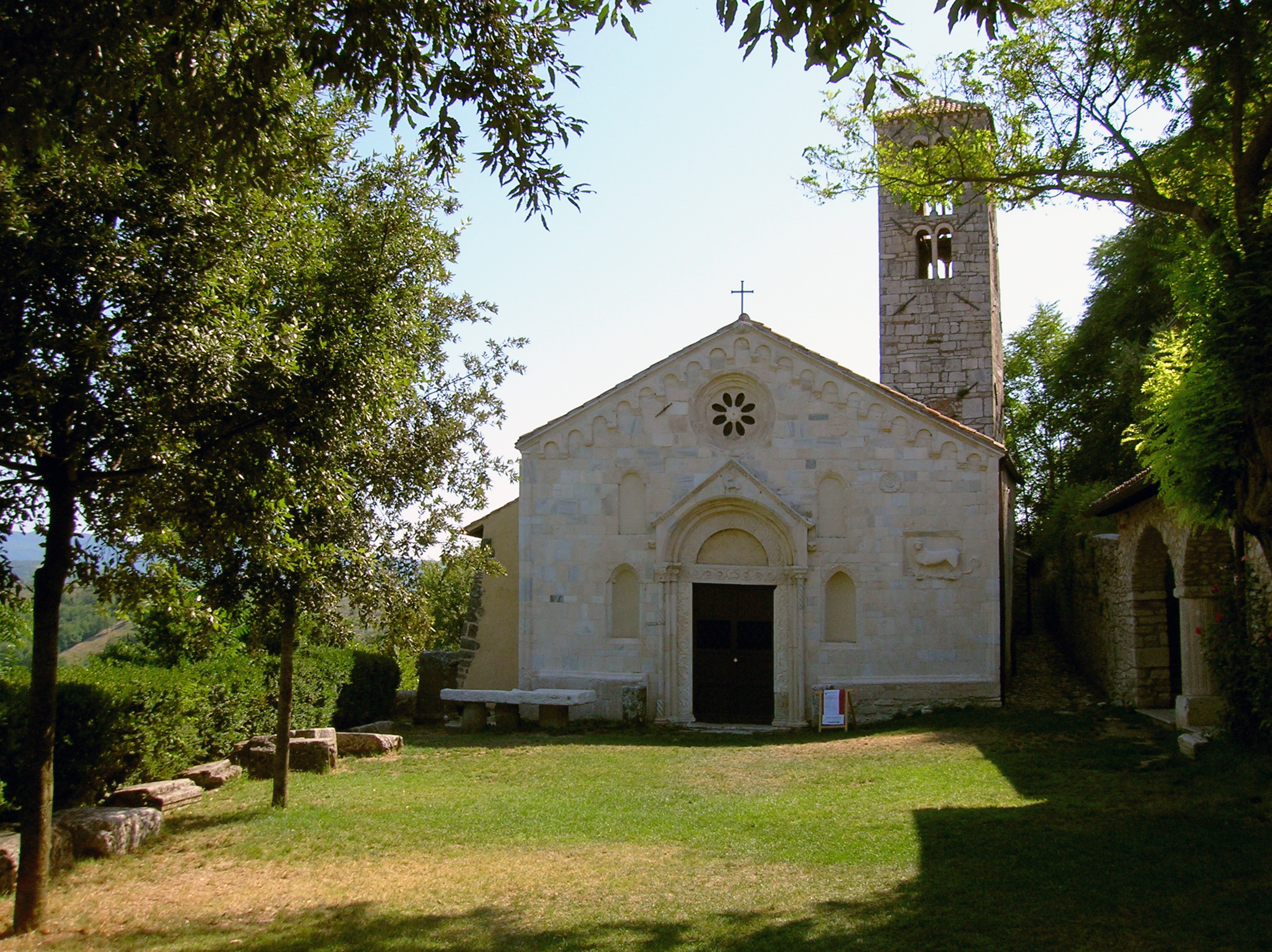
- Santa Vittoria Shrine.

- Coat of arms

- Location within Italy Location within Lazio
- Coordinates: 42°13′59″N 12°51′30″E
- Country: Italy
- Region: Lazio
- Province: Rieti (RI)
- Frazioni: Ginestra Sabina

Government
  - Mayor: Angelo Paolo Marcari

Area
  - Total: 18.8 km^{2} (7.3 sq mi)
- Elevation: 496 m (1,627 ft)

Population (30 November 2017)
  - Total: 1,231
  - Density: 65.5/km^{2} (170/sq mi)
- Demonym: Monteleonesi
- Time zone: UTC+1 (CET)
  - Summer (DST): UTC+2 (CEST)
- Postal code: 02033
- Dialing code: 0765
- Website: Official website

Monteleone Sabino is a comune (municipality) in the Province of Rieti in the Latium region of Italy, located about 45 kilometres (28 mi) northeast of Rome and about 20 kilometres (12 mi) south of Rieti.

== Main sights ==
- Trebula Mutusca: ruins of the ancient Sabine town
- Santa Vittoria: 12th-century Romanesque shrine or sanctuary church, which left side was rebuilt during the 15th century.

== Twin towns ==
- Santa Vittoria in Matenano, Italy
