= Santa Vittoria in Matenano =

- Comune
- Comune di Santa Vittoria in Matenano
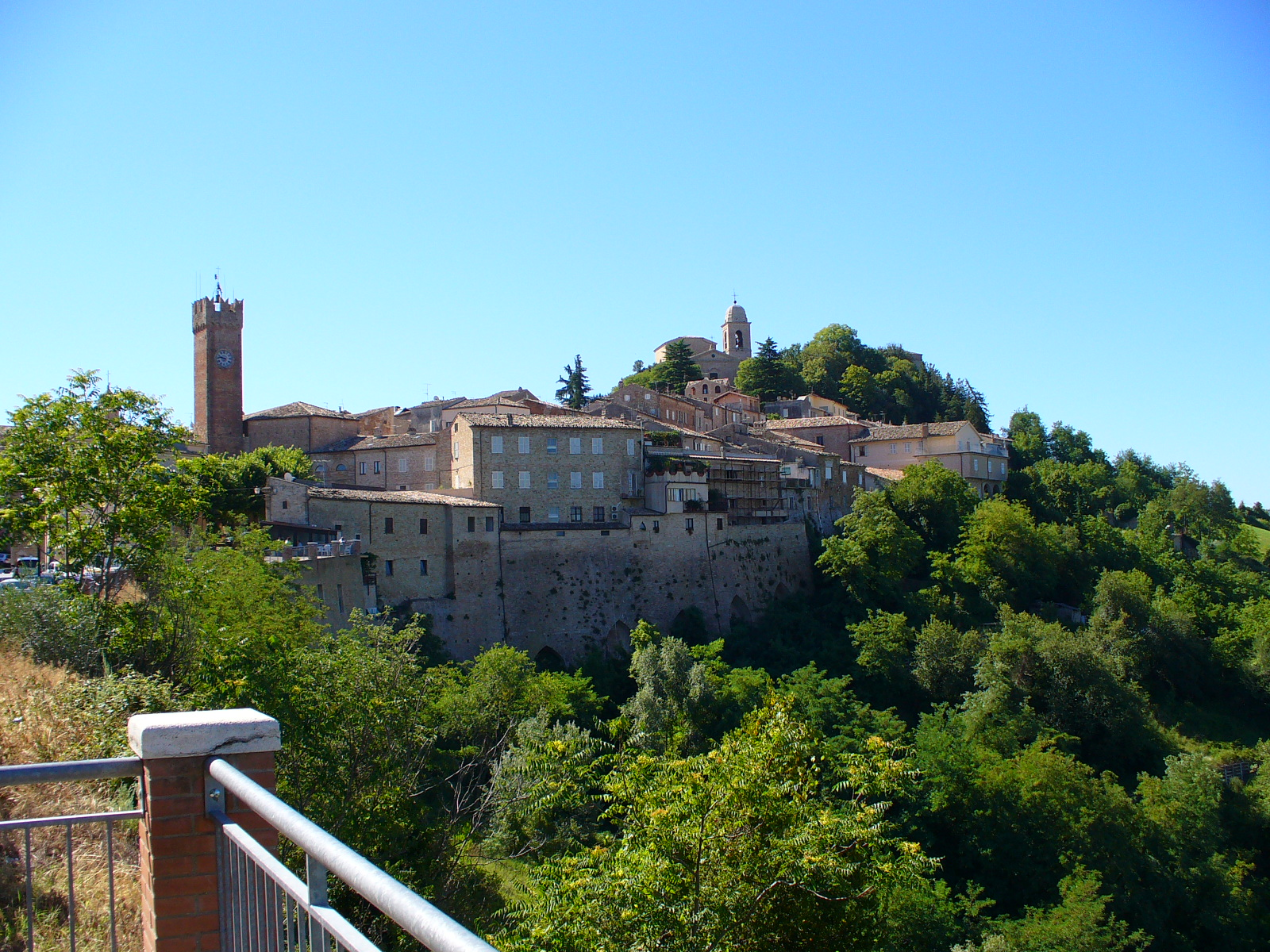

- Coat of arms

- Location within Italy Location within Marche
- Coordinates: 43°1′12.5″N 13°29′41.5″E
- Country: Italy
- Region: Marche
- Province: Fermo (FM)
- Frazioni: Ponte Maglio

Government
  - Mayor: Fabrizio Vergari

Area
  - Total: 26.18 km^{2} (10.11 sq mi)
- Elevation: 626 m (2,054 ft)

Population (31 December 2016)
  - Total: 1,321
  - Density: 50.46/km^{2} (130.7/sq mi)
- Demonym: Santavittoriesi
- Time zone: UTC+1 (CET)
  - Summer (DST): UTC+2 (CEST)
- Postal code: 63854
- Dialing code: 0734
- Patron saint: St. Victoria
- Saint day: 20 June
- Website: Official website

Santa Vittoria in Matenano is a comune (municipality) in the Province of Fermo in the central Italian region Marche, located about 70 kilometres (43 miles) south of Ancona and about 20 km (12 mi) northwest of Ascoli Piceno.

Its name refers to Saint Victoria, some of whose relics were transferred in 827 by Abbot Peter of Farfa from the Abbey to Mount Matenano in the Picene area (roughly the south of Le Marche) due to Saracen invasions. Ratfredus, a later Abbot of Farfa, brought the body of Santa Vittoria from Farfa on 20 June 931.

The 1966 published novel by Robert Crichton took place here. Stanley Kramer's The Secret of Santa Vittoria (1969) was shot in Anticoli Corrado, because the town had become too modernized since the Second World War period in which the story was set.

== International relations ==
=== Twin towns — Sister cities ===
Santa Vittoria in Matenano is twinned with:

Zvenigorod, Russia; Mqabba, Malta; Province of Rieti, Italy	Monteleone Sabino, Italy; Fara in Sabina, Italy; La Ferté-Saint-Aubin, France

== Photos ==
- www.flickr.com/photos/21899366@N07/sets/72157622532347787/
