= Minatia gens =

The gens Minatia was a minor plebeian family at Rome. The gens was probably of Sabine origin, as its nomen is derived from the Oscan praenomen Minatus, and the first of the family to appear in Roman history bore the surname Sabinus. Many Minatii are known from inscriptions.

== Members ==
This list includes abbreviated praenomina. For an explanation of this practice, see filiation.

- Marcus Minatius Sabinus, proquaestor in 46 BC, and a legate of Gnaeus Pompeius the younger in Spain.
- Marcus Minatius M. f. Sabinus, probably a descendant of the proquaestor, is also known from coins thought to be from the imperial period.
- Marcus Minatius Marcellus, a soldier known from an inscription at Rome.
- Minatius Campanus, the husband of Helvia Asterope, a woman buried at Grumentum in Lucania.
- Gaius Minatius, the former master of Gaius Minatius Herma and Gaius Minatius Onesimus.
- Gaius Minatius C. l. Herma, a freedman, buried at Rome, aged sixty.
- Gaius Minatius C. l. Onesimus, a freedman, buried at Rome.
- Quintus Minatius, named in an inscription from Capua.
- Artemo Minatius Trebi l., a freedman, mentioned in an inscription from Consilinum in Campania.
- Marcus Minatius, a close friend of Raecius Gallus, a flamen at Tarraco in Spain.
- Minatius, mentioned in an inscription from Pompeii.
- Gaius Minatius, the father of Gaius and Marcus.
- Gaius Minatius C. f. Africanus, buried at Aquileia.
- Marcus Minatius C. f.
- Maximus Minatius Carbo, a fisherman mentioned in an inscription from Pedona in Liguria.
- Aulus Minatius, the former master of Aulus.
- Aulus Minatius A. l., named in an inscription from Rome.
- Marcus Minatius Colax, a freedman mentioned in an inscription from Rome.
- Marcus Minatius Celer, a freedman mentioned in an inscription from Rome.
- Gaius Minatius Crescens, the father of Gaius Minatius Eutychus.
- Gaius Minatius C. f. Eutychus, buried at Rome, aged twenty-three years, two months, and five days.
- Gnaeus Minatius Eros, mentioned in an inscription from Rome, together with Minatia Apamia. They are also mentioned in an inscription from Asisium.
- Minatia Apamia, named in an inscription from Rome, and another from Asisium, together with Gnaeus Minatius Eros.
- Lucius Minatius Crescens, buried at Castellum Elefantum in Numidia, aged sixty-one.
- Minatius Felix, the father of Minatia Victrix.
- Minatia Victrix, daughter of Minatius Felix, and wife of Minatius Euaristus, was buried at Luceria, aged eighteen.
- Minatius Euaristus, the husband of Minatia Victrix.
- Publius Minatius Silvinus, mentioned in an inscription from the village of le Mufite.
- Marcus Minatius Hilarus, a freedman mentioned in an inscription from Allifae.
- Decimus Minatius, son of Minatius and Decidia Serena, died aged thirteen, and is buried at Atina in Lucania.
- Publius Minatius, the father of Secundus.
- Publius Minatius P. f. Secundus, buried at Numistro in Lucania.
- Gaius Minatius Bithus, mentioned in an inscription from Asculum in Apulia.
- Gnaeus Minatius, named in an inscription from Puteoli in Campania.
- Gnaeus Minatius, the former master of Gnaeus.
- Gnaeus Minatius Cn. l., a freedman mentioned in an inscription from Capua.
- Marcus Minatius M. f., one of two duumvirs, or chief judges, elected for a term of five years, according to an inscription at Visentium in Etruria.
- Quintus Minatius Tiridas, the father of Celer.
- Quintus Minatius Q. f. Celer Claudianus, buried at Massilia, where his wife, Plaria Vera, and his father, Quintus Minatius Tiridas, erected a monument.
- Minatius P. l. Varus, a freedman buried at Narbo in Gallia Narbonensis.
- Sextus Minatius Sex. f., mentioned in an inscription from Nomentum in Latium.
- Lucius Minatius Genialis, buried at Emerita Augusta in Lusitania, aged sixty-five.
- Gaius Minatius Jucundus, an official buried at Pompeii.
- Marcus Minatius, banker of Oscan origin.

== See also ==
- List of Roman gentes

== Bibliography ==
- Joseph Hilarius Eckhel, Doctrina Numorum Veterum (The Study of Ancient Coins, 1792–1798).
- Dictionary of Greek and Roman Biography and Mythology, William Smith, ed., Little, Brown and Company, Boston (1849).
- Theodor Mommsen et alii, Corpus Inscriptionum Latinarum (The Body of Latin Inscriptions, abbreviated CIL), Berlin-Brandenburgische Akademie der Wissenschaften (1853–present).
- René Cagnat et alii, L'Année épigraphique (The Year in Epigraphy, abbreviated AE), Presses Universitaires de France (1888–present).
- George Davis Chase, "The Origin of Roman Praenomina", in Harvard Studies in Classical Philology, vol. VIII (1897).
- Paul von Rohden, Elimar Klebs, & Hermann Dessau, Prosopographia Imperii Romani (The Prosopography of the Roman Empire, abbreviated PIR), Berlin (1898).
- T. Robert S. Broughton, The Magistrates of the Roman Republic, American Philological Association (1952).
- A. Hüttemann, Pompejanische Inschriften, Stuttgart (2010).
