= Victoria, Anatolia, and Audax =

Roman Catholic Saints & Martyrs

Saints Victoria, Anatolia, and Audax
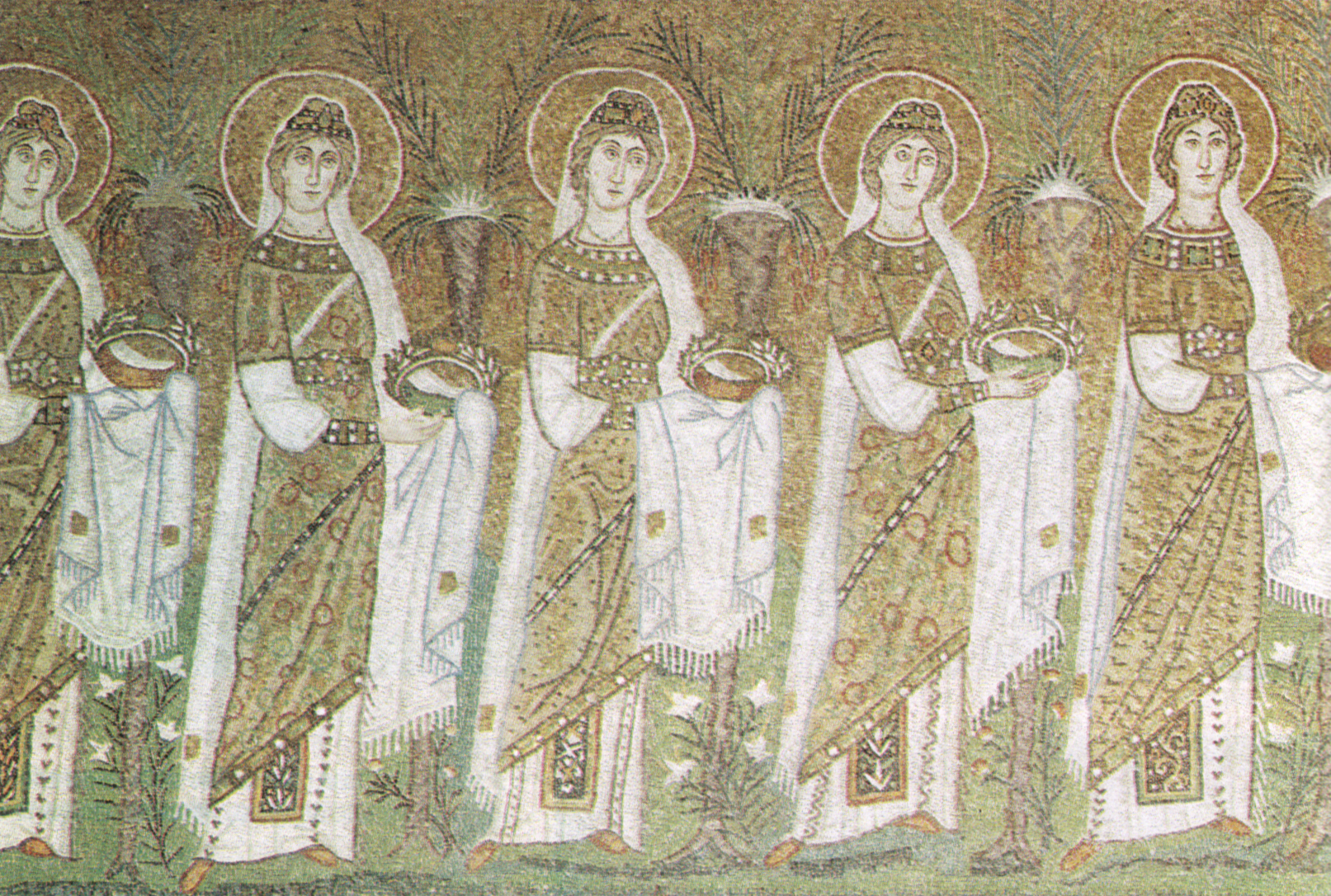
- Victoria and Anatolia are portrayed amongst the mosaic Procession of Virgins in the Basilica of Sant'Apollinare Nuovo, Ravenna.
- Died: 250 AD; Trebula Mutuesca (Victoria); Tora (Anatolia and Audax)
- Venerated in: Roman Catholic Church; Eastern Orthodox Church
- Feast: 10 July, and, additionally 23 December in the Orthodox Church
- Patronage: Sant'Anatolia di Borgorose, Monteleone Sabino, Łowicz

Saints Victoria, Anatolia, and Audax (Italian: Sante Vittoria, Anatolia, e Audace) are venerated as martyrs and saints by the Catholic Church and Eastern Orthodox Church.

== Sources ==
Victoria and Anatolia are mentioned (without Audax) in the Roman Martyrology under the date of 10 July. Anatolia was first mentioned in the De Laude Sanctorum composed in 396 by Victrice (Victricius), bishop of Rouen (330–409).

Anatolia and Victoria are mentioned together in the Martyrologium Hieronymianum under 10 July: VI idus iulii in Savinis Anatholiae Victoriae; Victoria is also mentioned alone under 19 December: In Savinis civitate Tribulana Victoriae. The two saints appear in the mosaics of Basilica of Sant'Apollinare Nuovo, at Ravenna, between Paulina of Rome and Christina of Bolsena. A Passio Ss. Anatoliae et Audacis et S. Victoriae of the 6th or seventh century, which added the name of Audax, was mentioned by Aldhelm (died 709) and Bede (died 735), who list the saints in their martyrologies. Caesar Baronius lists Anatolia and Audax under 9 July and Victoria under 23 December.

== Legend ==
Their legend recounts that, in the time of the Emperor Decius, Anatolia and Victoria were sisters whose marriage was arranged to two noble, non-Christian Roman men. They resisted matrimony. Their prospective grooms were reluctant to denounce them as Christians as that would mean that the women's possessions would be forfeited to the state. They received permission to imprison the women on their estates and convince them to renounce their faith. Anatolia's suitor, Titus Aurelius, gave up, and handed her back to the authorities. Victoria's suitor, Eugenius, was more persistent, but also ended up returning her to the authorities.

== Deaths ==
Victoria's legend states that she was stabbed through the heart in 250 AD at Trebula Mutuesca (today Monteleone Sabino) after chasing away a dragon terrorizing the residents in exchange for their conversion. An elaboration on her legend states that her murderer was immediately struck with leprosy, and died six days later. Anatolia was killed, also in 250 AD, at "Thora" (identified with present-day Sant'Anatolia di Borgorose). Her legend states that she was at first locked up with a poisonous snake. The snake refused to bite her, and a soldier named Audax was sent into her cell to kill her. The snake attacked him instead, but Anatolia saved him from the snake. Impressed by her example, he converted to Christianity and was martyred by the sword with her.

== Spread of cult ==
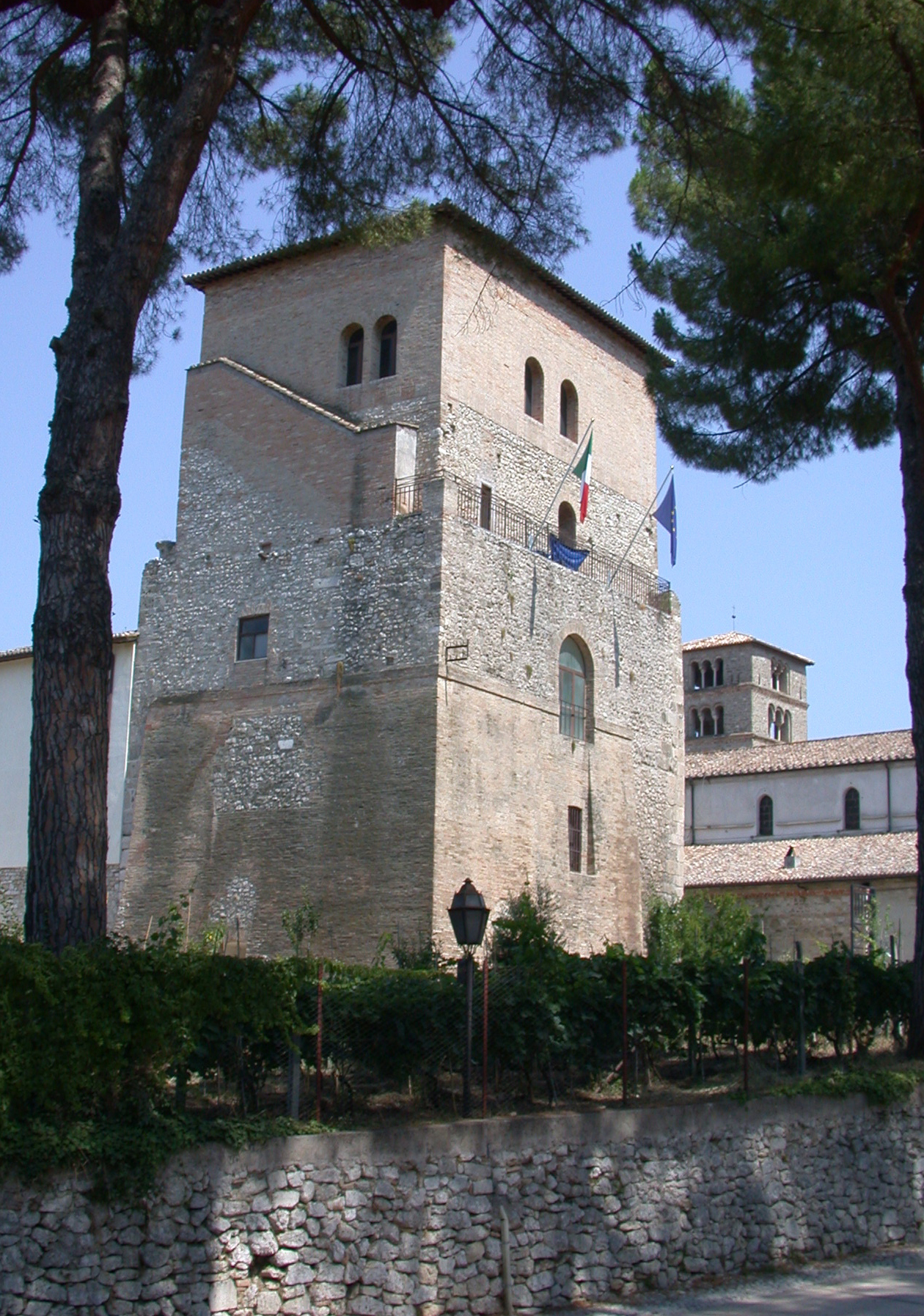
The Abbey of Farfa.

Due to the translation of their relics, their cult spread across Italy. Some relics of Saint Victoria were transferred in 827 by Abbot Peter of Farfa from the Abbey to Mount Matenano in the Picene area (roughly the south of Le Marche) because the Abbey was besieged by "Saracens". The town of Santa Vittoria in Matenano is named after her. Ratfredus, a later Abbot of Farfa, brought the body from Farfa to Santa Vittoria in Matenano on 20 June 931.

The bodies of Anatolia and Audax were transferred by Abbot Leo to Subiaco around 950. At an unknown date, a scapula of Anatolia was translated to the present-day Sant'Anatolia di Borgorose and an arm of the saint was translated to the present-day Esanatoglia. The bodies of Anatolia and Audax still rest at Subiaco in the basilica of Santa Scholastica, under the altar of the sacrament. Anatolia's feast day was 9 July. A simulacrum and other relics of Saint Victoria are currently on display at the Santa Maria della Vittoria church in Rome.

St Mary's Cathedral, Kilkenny, Ireland also claims to hold St Victoria's body, preserved in wax, along with a chalice containing some of her blood. These were supposedly sent to Kilkenny in 1845 by Pope Gregory XVI.

== Sources ==
- At Santi, Beati e Testimoni
  - (in Italian) Santa Anatolia
  - (in Italian) Santa Vittoria
- At Santa Anatolia (a town in the province of Rieti)
- (in Italian) Santa Anatolia (for the legend of Anatolia and Victoria, click on "S. Anatolia" in the index on the left)
