= Sabus =

Character in Sabine mythology

Sabus is a character in the mythology of the Sabines of Italy, the son of the god Sancus (called by some Jupiter Fidius). According to Cato, writing in his work Origines, the Sabines took their name from his.

However, Zenodotus of Troezen holds that the Sabines took their name from the already-existing name of their place of habitation. And according to contemporary legend (unsubstantiated and presumably untrue), the Sabines were descendants of Spartan colonists led by a person named Sabus, and took their name from him.

According to Henry Alleyne Nicholson, Sabus is related to the Egyptian Sobek and other entities from other cultures.
