= Dius Fidius =

Ancient Roman god related to oaths

In ancient Roman religion, Dius Fidius (less often as Dius Fidus) was a god of oaths associated with Jupiter. His name was thought to be related to Fides.

Fidius may be an earlier form for filius, "son", with the name Dius Fidius originally referring to Hercules as a son of Jupiter. According to some writers, the phrase medius fidius was equivalent to mehercule "My Hercules!", a common interjection.

== Theology ==
Varro states that his teacher Aelius Stilo called this god Diovis filium, i.e. Dius Filius as the Greek Διόσκορον Castorem on the grounds of the alteration of the letters d and l in the Sabine tongue. He identified him in Sabine, Sancus and in Greek, Hercules. This assumption is not linguistically correct, because in the Iguvine Tables the god is named Fis(i)us or Fisovius Sancius. However, his interpretation, based on unknown theological documents, tallies with that of some modern scholars. The god, at some points, was certainly not a mere aspect of Jupiter but a separate entity, known in Rome for some time as Semo Sancus Dius Fidius. Wissowa argues that Jupiter and Dius Fidius divide responsibility for ensuring good faith. The most important oaths are sworn by Jupiter, the god of the Fides Publica Populi Romani as Iuppiter Lapis. Dius Fidius protects good faith in private affairs: he corresponds to Ζευς Πίστιος. This view may well reflect a later development but is not the original interpretation. Dius Fidius was not confined to private fides in early times. Matters of public relevance (such as the first international treaty of Rome, the one with Gabii) were preserved in his shrine (put under his jurisdiction).

The shrine of Sancus had no roof, as it was deemed inappropriate and ineffective to swear oaths unless under the sky. The Capitoline temple also had an opening in its roof.

The association of Dius Fidius with Jupiter is divine filiation. Dumézil underlines the peculiar intertwining and mixing of Jupiter and Dius Fidius as wardens of oaths and wielders of lightning bolts. Both require an opening in the roof of their temples while leaving unanswered for Dumézil the question of the true identity of the latter.

This functional overlap generated confusion about the identity of Sancus Dius Fidius among ancient and modern scholars, as Dius Fidius has sometimes been considered another theonym for Jupiter. However, the autonomy of Semo Sancus from Jupiter and the fact that Dius Fidius is an alternate theonym designating Semo Sancus (and not Jupiter) is shown by the name of the correspondent Umbrian god Fisus Sancius which compounds the two constituent parts of Sancus and Dius Fidius: in Umbrian and Sabine Fisus is the exact correspondent of Fidius, as e.g. Sabine Clausus of Latin Claudius.

The fact that Sancus as Jupiter is in charge of the observance of oaths, of the laws of hospitality and of loyalty (Fides) connects him with the sphere and values of sovereignty, i.e. in Dumézil's terminology, of the first function.

Wissowa advanced the hypothesis that Semo Sancus is the genius of Jupiter. W. W. Fowler cautioned that this interpretation looks to be an anachronism and Sancus is a Genius Iovius, as it appears from the Iguvine Tables. The concept of a genius of a deity is attested only in the imperial period.

Theodor Mommsen, William Warde Fowler and Georges Dumézil among others rejected the tradition that ascribes a Sabine origin to the Roman cult of Semo Sancus Dius Fidius, partly on linguistic grounds as the theonym is Latin and no mention or evidence of a Sabine Semo is found near Rome, while the Semones are attested in Latin in the carmen Arvale. In their view Sancus would be a deity who was shared by all ancient Italic peoples, whether Osco-Umbrian or Latino-Faliscan.

The details of the cult of Fisus Sancius at Iguvium and those of Fides at Rome, such as the use of the mandraculum, a piece of linen fabric covering the right hand of the officiant, and of the urfeta (orbita) or of the orbes ahenei, sort of small bronze disc brought in the right hand by the officiant at Iguvium and also deposed in the temple of Semo Sancus in 329 B.C. after an affair of treason confirm the parallelism.

Some aspects of Dius Fidius' oath ritual, such as requiring the open sky, the compluvium of private residences and the fact the temple of Sancus had no roof, implied to romanist O. Sacchi the idea that Dius Fidius' oath predated that for Iuppiter Lapis or Iuppiter Feretrius, and had its origin in prehistoric rituals, when the templum was in the open air and defined by natural landmarks such as the highest nearby tree. Supporting this interpretation is the explanation of the theonym Sancus as meaning sky in Sabine given by Johannes Lydus, an etymology that, however, is rejected by Dumézil, Briquel and others.

All the known details concerning Sancus connect him to the sphere of oaths, respect of compacts and the divine guarantee against their breach. These values are all proper to sovereign gods and in common with Jupiter (and with Mitra in Vedic religion).

== See also ==
- Sancus
