= Trebula Suffenas =

Archaeological site in Italy

Coordinates: 41.9547°N 12.9378°E

Trebula (Greek: Τρήβουλα) or Trebula Suffenas or Trebula Suffenes, was an ancient city of the Sabines, one of two bearing the name Trebula (the other being Trebula Mutusca) – Pliny being the only author who mentions both places: Trebulani qui cognominantur Mutuscaei, et qui Suffenates.

== Location ==
Its site is most likely be at or near Ciciliano, where most of the inscriptions referring to the city have been found, and possibly near Passo della Fortuna, a frazione of Ciciliano.

It is probable that the Tribula (Τρίβολα) of Dionysius, mentioned by him among the towns assigned by Varro to the Aborigines (Dionys. i. 14) is the same as the Trebula Suffenas of Pliny. In this case we know that it could not be far from Reate.

The Tabula Peutingeriana depicts Treblis in sector 5B1, on the route between Praeneste and Carsulis.
