= Sabellians =

Ancient peoples living in Italy

Sabellians is a collective ethnonym for a group of Italic peoples or tribes inhabiting central and southern Italy at the time of the rise of Rome. The name was first applied by Niebuhr and encompassed the Sabines, Marsi, Marrucini and Vestini. Pliny in one passage says the Samnites were also called Sabelli, and this is confirmed by Strabo. The term Sabellus is found also in Livy and other Latin writers, as an adjective form for Samnite, though never for the name of the nation; but it is frequently also used, especially by the poets, simply as an equivalent for the adjective Sabine.

== Ethnonym ==
In the modern usage it is also a synonym for the whole, or only a part, of the different Osco-Umbrian peoples and it is supposed it had effectively been their ethnic endonym from an Old Italic (or Proto-Italic) root *sabh-:

- Old Italic/Indo-European root *sabh- >
  - Latin sab- (Sabini, Sabelli, Samnites, Samnium)
  - Osco-Umbrian *saf- (Safineis, Safinìm), and consequently:
    - Oscan *safno > *safnio > Safinìm > Samnium
    - Sabellic *safio > Safini > Sabini.

For example:

- Oscan Safineis
- Latin Samnites.

== Geography ==
Strabo in his Geography (V, 3, 1) writes: "The Sabini not only are a very ancient race but are also the indigenous inhabitants (and both the Picentini and the Samnitae are colonists from the Sabini, and the Leucani from the Samnitae, and the Brettii from the Leucani)."

== Bibliography ==
- Smith, William; Dictionary of Greek and Roman Geography, London, (1854)

== See also ==
- Samnites
- Sabines
- Italic peoples
