= Lucius Aelius Stilo Praeconinus =

Roman philologist (c. 154 – 74 BC)

Lucius Aelius Stilo Praeconinus (/ˈstaɪloʊ/, Latin: [ˈst̪ɪloː]; c. 154 – 74 BC), of Lanuvium, was the earliest known philologist of the Roman Republic. He came from a distinguished family and belonged to the equestrian order.

He was called Stilo (from Latin stilus, "pen for writing on wax") because he wrote speeches for others, and Praeconinus from his father's profession (praeco, "announcer, public crier, herald"). His aristocratic sympathies were so strong that he voluntarily accompanied Caecilius Metellus Numidicus into exile. At Rome he divided his time between teaching (although not as a professional schoolmaster) and literary work.

His most famous pupils were Varro and Cicero, and amongst his friends was Coelius Antipater, the historian. According to Cicero, who expressed a poor opinion of his powers as an orator, Stilo was a follower of the Stoic school. Only a few fragments of his works remain. He wrote commentaries on the hymns of the Salii (Carmen Saliare), and probably also on the Twelve Tables. He analysed the authenticity of comedies supposedly by Plautus, and recognized 25 as canonical, four more than were allowed by Varro.

It is probable that he was the author of a general glossographical work, dealing with literary, historical and antiquarian questions. The rhetorical treatise Ad Herennium was attributed to him by some scholars of the early 20th century.

== Bibliography ==
=== Ancient sources ===
- Cicero, Brutus, 205–207, De legibus, ii.23, 59
- Suetonius, De grammaticis, 2
- Gellius iii. 3, I.12
- Quintilian, Inst. orat., x, I, 99

=== 19th-century scholarship ===
- Jan Adolf Karel van Heusde Dissertatio de Aelio Stilone, Ciceronis in Rhetoricis magistro, Rhetoricorum ad Herennium, ut videtur auctore(1839)
- Ferdinand Mentz De Lucio Aelio Stilone (1888)
- Theodor Mommsen, Hist. of Rome, bk. iv, ch. 12, 13
- J. E. Sandys, History of Classical Scholarship (2nd ed., 1906)
- Martin Schanz, Geschichte der römischen Literatur (1898), vol. i.
- Teuffel, History of Roman Literature (Eng. trans., 1900), p. 148.
