= Sabines =

Ancient Italic people

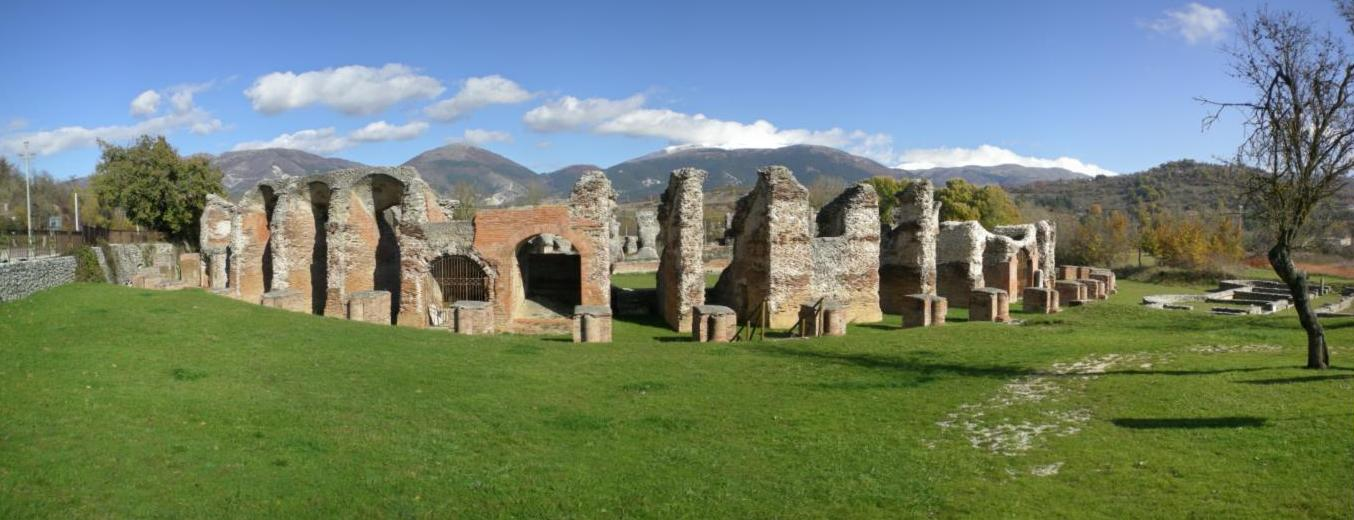
Amiternum, an ancient city founded by the Sabines

Map showing the location of the Sabines. The border with Latium to the south was the Aniene river; however, it is possible that Sabines extended to Lake Regillus slightly to the south of it near Gabii.

The Sabines (US: /ˈseɪbaɪnz/, SAY-bynes, UK: /ˈsæbaɪnz/, SAB-eyens; Latin: Sabini) were an Italic people who lived in the central Apennine Mountains (see Sabina) of the ancient Italian Peninsula, also inhabiting Latium north of the Anio before the founding of Rome.

The Sabines divided into two populations just after the founding of Rome, which is described by Roman legend. The division, however it came about, is not legendary. The population closer to Rome transplanted itself to the new city and united with the preexisting citizenry, beginning a new heritage that descended from the Sabines but was also Latinized. The second population remained a mountain tribal state, coming finally to war against Rome for its independence along with all the other Italic tribes. Afterwards, it became assimilated into the Roman Republic.

== Etymology ==
The Sabines derived directly from the ancient Umbrians and belonged to the same ethnic group as the Samnites and the Sabelli, as attested by the common ethnonyms of Safineis (in ancient Greek σαφινείς) and by the toponyms safinim and safina (at the origin of the terms Samnium and Sabinum). The Indo-European root *Saβeno or *Sabh evolved into the word Safen, which later became Safin. From Safinim, Sabinus, Sabellus and Samnis, an Indo-European root can be extracted, *sabh-, which becomes Sab- in Latino-Faliscan and Saf- in Osco-Umbrian: Sabini and *Safineis.

At some point in prehistory, a population speaking a common language extended over both Samnium and Umbria. Salmon conjectures that it was common Italic and puts forward a date of 600 BC, after which the common language began to separate into dialects. This date does not necessarily correspond to any historical or archaeological evidence; developing a synthetic view of the ethnology of proto-historic Italy is an incomplete and ongoing task.

Linguist Julius Pokorny carries the etymology somewhat further back. Conjecturing that the -a- was altered from an -o- during some prehistoric residence in Illyria, he derives the names from an o-grade extension *swo-bho- of an extended e-grade *swe-bho- of the possessive adjective, *s(e)we-, of the reflexive pronoun, *se-, "oneself" (the source of English self). The result is a set of Indo-European tribal names (if not the endonym of the Indo-Europeans): Germanic Suebi and Semnones, Suiones; Celtic Senones; Slavic Serbs and Sorbs; Italic Sabelli, Sabini, etc., as well as a large number of kinship terms.

== Historical geography ==
Latin-speakers called the Sabines' original territory Sabinum, and to this day the ancient tribe's name in the Italian form of Sabina. It straddled the modern regions of Lazio, Umbria, and Abruzzo. Within the modern region of Lazio (or Latium), Sabina constitutes a sub-region, situated north-east of Rome, around Rieti.

== History ==
=== Origin and early history ===
The Sabines settled in Sabinum, around the tenth century BC, founding the cities of Reate, Trebula Mutuesca and Cures Sabini. Dionysius of Halicarnassus mentions the Sabines in relation to the Aborigines, from whom they allegedly stole their capital Lista, with a surprise war action starting from Amiternum. Ancient historians debated the specific origins of the Sabines. According to Strabo, after a long war with the Umbrians the Sabines migrated to the land of the Opici following the ancient Italic rite of the Ver Sacrum. The Sabines then drove out the Opici and encamped in that region. Zenodotus of Troezen claimed that the Sabines were originally Umbrians that changed their name after being driven from the Reatine territory by the Pelasgians. Porcius Cato argued that the Sabines were a populace named after Sabus, the son of Sancus (a divinity of the area sometimes called Jupiter Fidius). In another account mentioned in Dionysius's work, a group of Lacedaemonians fled Sparta since they regarded the laws of Lycurgus as too severe. In Italy, they founded the Spartan colony of Foronia (near the Pomentine plains) and some from that colony settled among the Sabines. According to the account, the Sabine habits of belligerence and frugality were known to have derived from the Spartans. Plutarch also mentions, in the Life of Numa Pompilius, "Sabines, who declare themselves to be a colony of the Lacedaemonians". Plutarch also wrote that the Pythagoras of Sparta, who was Olympic victor in the foot-race, helped Numa arrange the government of the city and many Spartan customs introduced by him to the Numa and the people.

== At Rome ==
=== Legend of the Sabine women ===
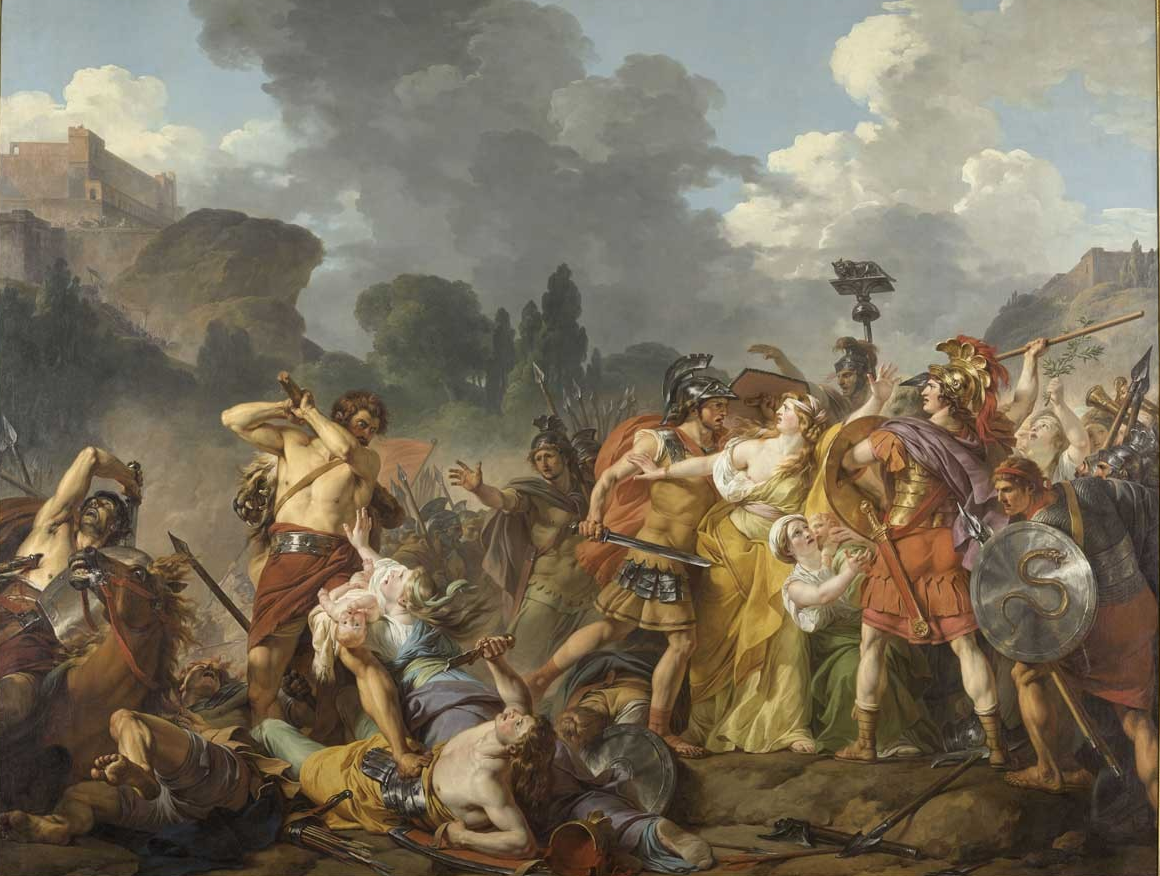
The Intervention of the Sabine Women by François-André Vincent, 1781

Legend says that the Romans abducted Sabine women to populate the newly built Rome. The resultant war ended only by the women throwing themselves and their children between the armies of their fathers and their husbands. The Rape of the Sabine Women became a common motif in art; the women ending the war is a less frequent but still reappearing motif.

According to Livy, after the conflict, the Sabine and Roman states merged, and the Sabine king Titus Tatius jointly ruled Rome with Romulus until Tatius' death five years later. Three new centuries of Equites were introduced at Rome, including one named Tatienses, after the Sabine king.

A variation of the story is recounted in the pseudepigraphal Sefer haYashar (see Jasher 17:1–15).

=== Traditions ===
Tradition suggests that the population of the early Roman kingdom was the result of a union of Sabines and others. Some of the gentes of the Roman republic were proud of their Sabine heritage, such as the Claudia gens, assuming Sabinus as a cognomen or agnomen. Some specifically Sabine deities and cults were known at Rome: Semo Sancus and Quirinus, and at least one area of the town, the Quirinale, where the temples to those latter deities were located, had once been a Sabine centre. The extravagant claims of Varro and Cicero that augury, divination by dreams and the worship of Minerva and Mars originated with the Sabines are disputable, as they were general Italic and Latin customs, as well as Etruscan, even though they were espoused by Numa Pompilius, second king of Rome and a Sabine.

=== Religion ===
==== Sabine gods ====
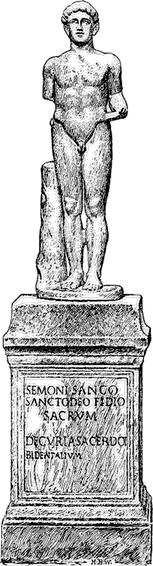
Statue of Semo Sancus from his shrine on the Quirinal

Many of the following deities were shared with the Etruscan religion, and were also adopted into the derivative Samnite and ancient Roman religion.

- Angitia
- Diana (Note: Later adopted into ancient Roman religion.)
- Feronia
- Fortuna
- Fons
- Fides (Note: For Fides, see also Semo Sancus or Dius Fidius.)
- Flora
- Herentas (equivalent of Venus)
- the Lares (guardian deities)
- Larunda
- Lucina
- Luna
- Mamers (Note: God of war, with thunder attributes.)
- Mefitis
- Minerva
- the Novensides (council of thunder gods)
- Ops
- Pales
- Quirinus
- Sabus
- Salus
- Sancus
- Saturn
- Sol
- Soranus (Note: God of underworld fire, with thunder attributes.)
- Strenia
- Summanus (Note: God of darkness, with thunder attributes.)
- Terminus
- Vacuna
- Vediovis
- Vortumnus
- Vitula
- Vulcan

Roman author Varro, who was himself of Sabine origin, gives a list of Sabine gods who were adopted by the Romans. Elsewhere, Varro claims Sol Indiges – who had a sacred grove at Lavinium – as Sabine but at the same time equates him with Apollo. Of those listed, he writes, "several names have their roots in both languages, as trees that grow on a property line creep into both fields. Saturn, for instance, can be said to have another origin here, and so too Diana." (Note: Latin: e quis nonnulla nomina in utraque lingua habent radices, ut arbores quae in confinio natae in utroque agro serpunt: potest enim Saturnus hic de alia causa esse dictus atque in Sabinis, et sic Diana.)

Varro makes various claims for Sabine origins throughout his works, some more plausible than others, and his list should not be taken at face value. But the importance of the Sabines in the early cultural formation of Rome is evidenced, for instance, by the bride abduction of the Sabine women by Romulus's men, and in the Sabine ethnicity of Numa Pompilius, second king of Rome, to whom are attributed many of Rome's religious and legal institutions. Varro, however, says that the altars to most of these gods were established at Rome by King Tatius as the result of a vow (votum). (Note: Tatius is said by Varro to have dedicated altars to "Ops, Flora, Vediovis, and Saturn; to Sol, Luna, Vulcan, and Summanus; and likewise to Larunda, Terminus, Quirinus, Vortumnus, the Lares, Diana, and Lucina.")

== State ==
During the expansion of ancient Rome, there were a series of conflicts with the Sabines. Manius Curius Dentatus conquered the Sabines in 290 BC. The citizenship without the right of suffrage was given to the Sabines in the same year. The right of suffrage was granted to the Sabines in 268 BC.

== Prominent Sabines ==
=== Gentes of Sabine origin ===
- Aemilia gens – Patrician
- Aurelia gens
- Calpurnia gens
- Calvisia gens
- Claudia gens – Patrician
- Curtia gens – Patrician
- Flavia gens
- Ligaria (gens)
- Marcia gens – Patrician
- Minatia (gens)
- Oppia gens – Patrician
- Opsia gens
- Ostoria gens
- Pantuleia (gens)
- Petronia gens
- Pinaria gens
- Pompilia gens
- Pomponia gens
- Poppaea gens
- Quirinia gens
- Rania gens
- Rubellia gens
- Sabinia gens
- Safinia gens
- Sallustia gens
- Saturia gens
- Sertoria gens
- Sicinia gens
- Tarpeia gens – Patrician
- Tineia gens
- Titia gens
- Valeria gens – Patrician

=== Romans of Sabine ancestry ===
- Titus Tatius, legendary King of the Sabines
- Numa Pompilius, legendary King of Rome
- Ancus Marcius, legendary King of Rome
- Quintus Sertorius, republican general
- Sextus Vettulenus Cerialis, Roman senator, military commander, and first legate of Judea
- Attius Clausus, founder of the Roman Claudia gens
- Gaius Sallustius Crispus, Roman writer
- Marcus Terentius Varro, Roman scholar
- Vespasian, Emperor of Rome and founder of the Flavian dynasty
- Quintus Curtius Rufus, Roman historian and writer of Historiae Alexandri Magni (Histories of Alexander the Great)

== Gallery ==
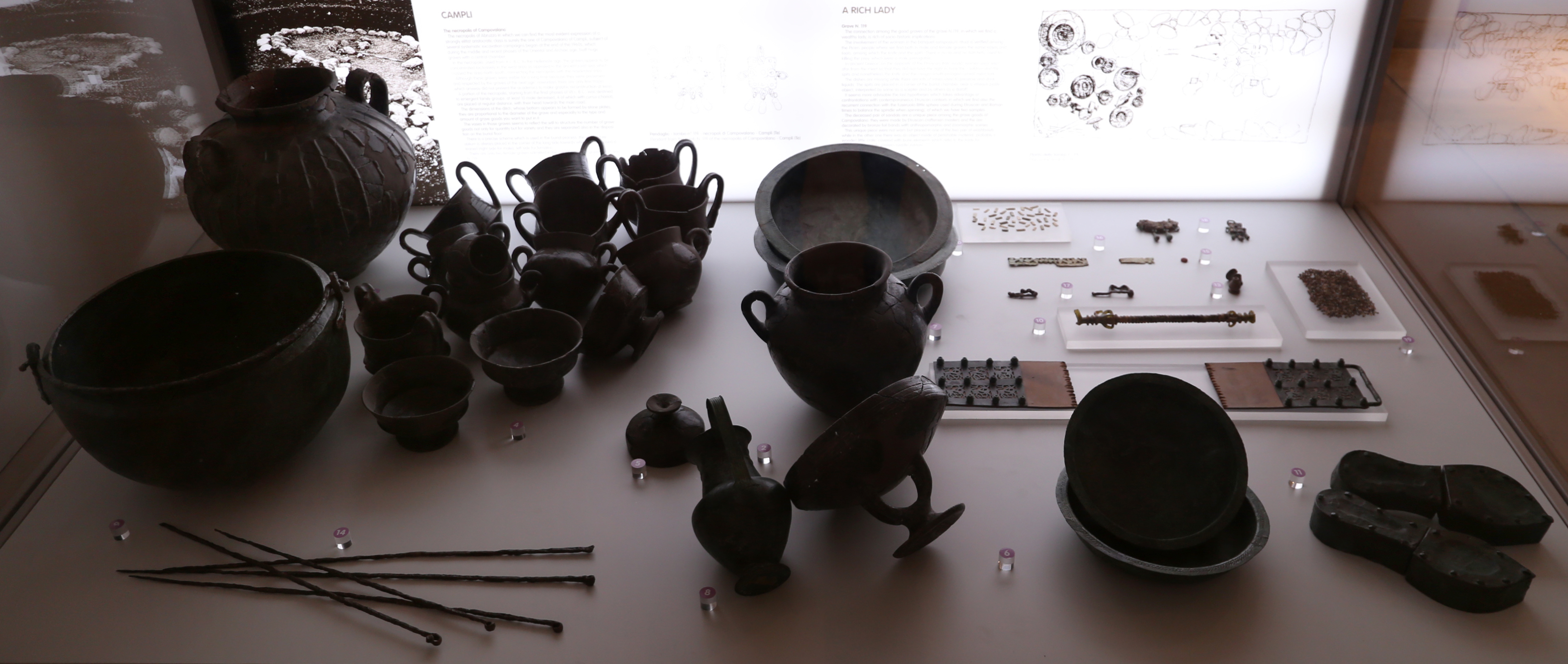
Grave goods 7th-6th century BC

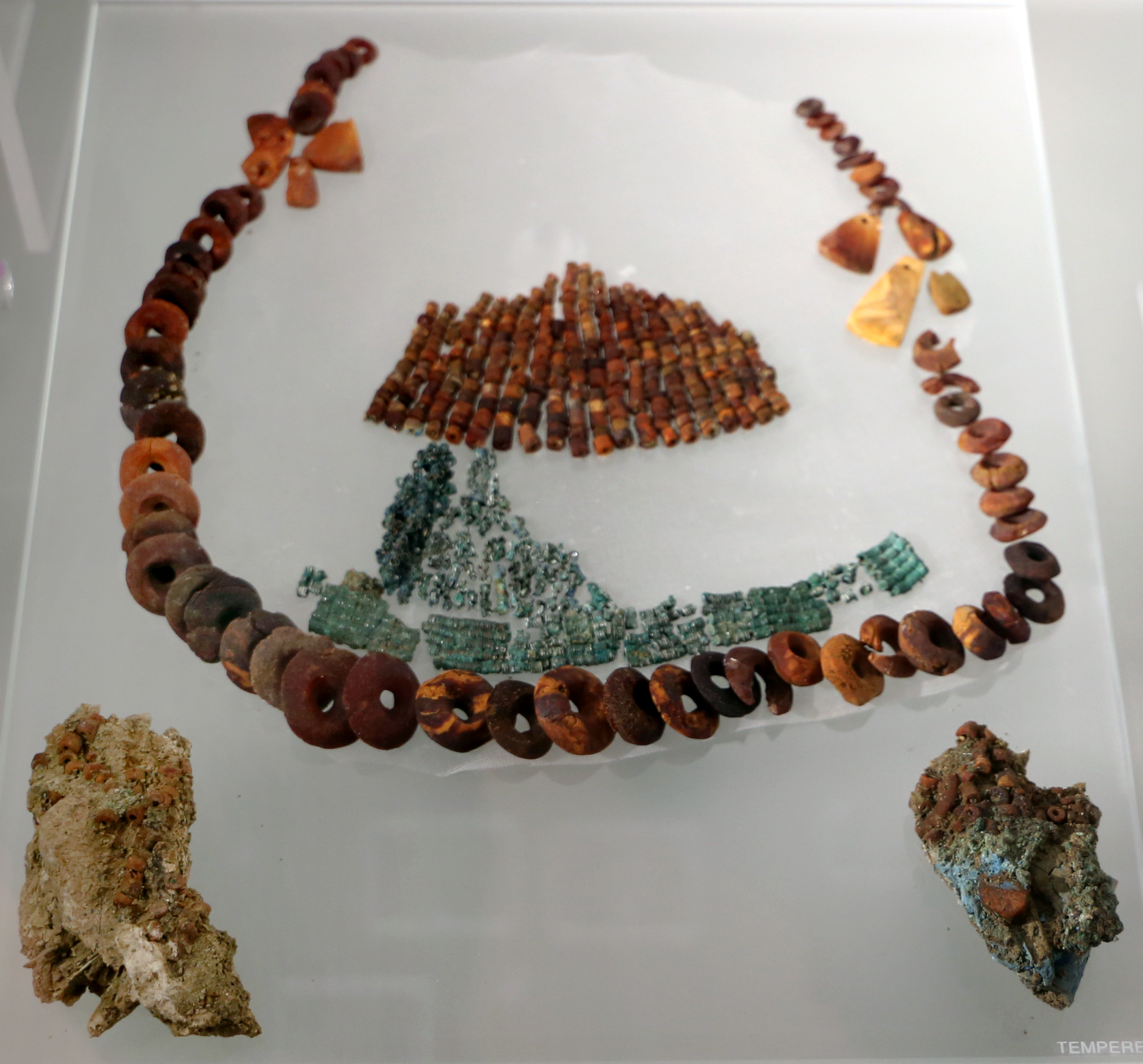
Bronze and amber jewellery, c. 800-700 BC

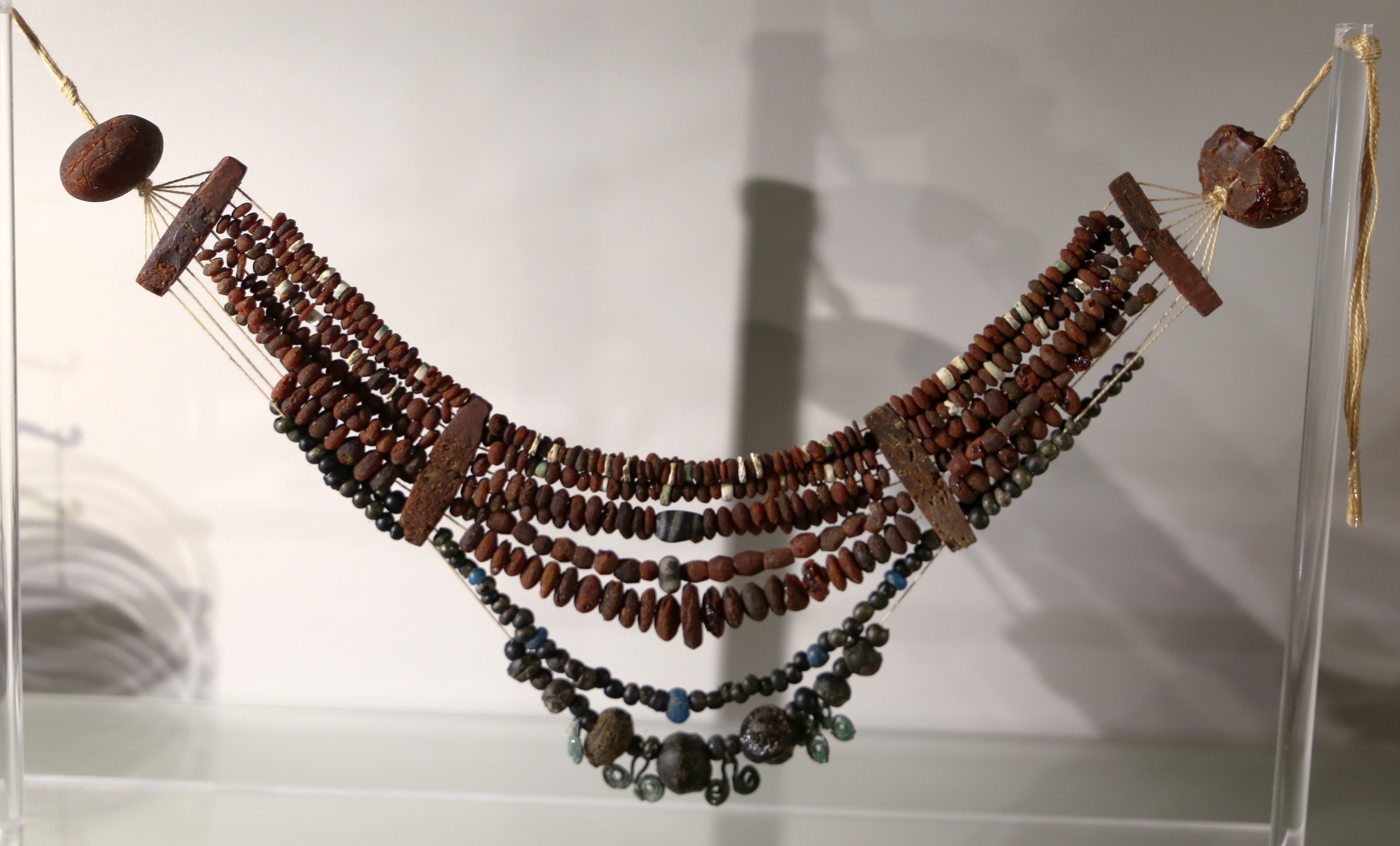
Jewellery, c. 800-700 BC

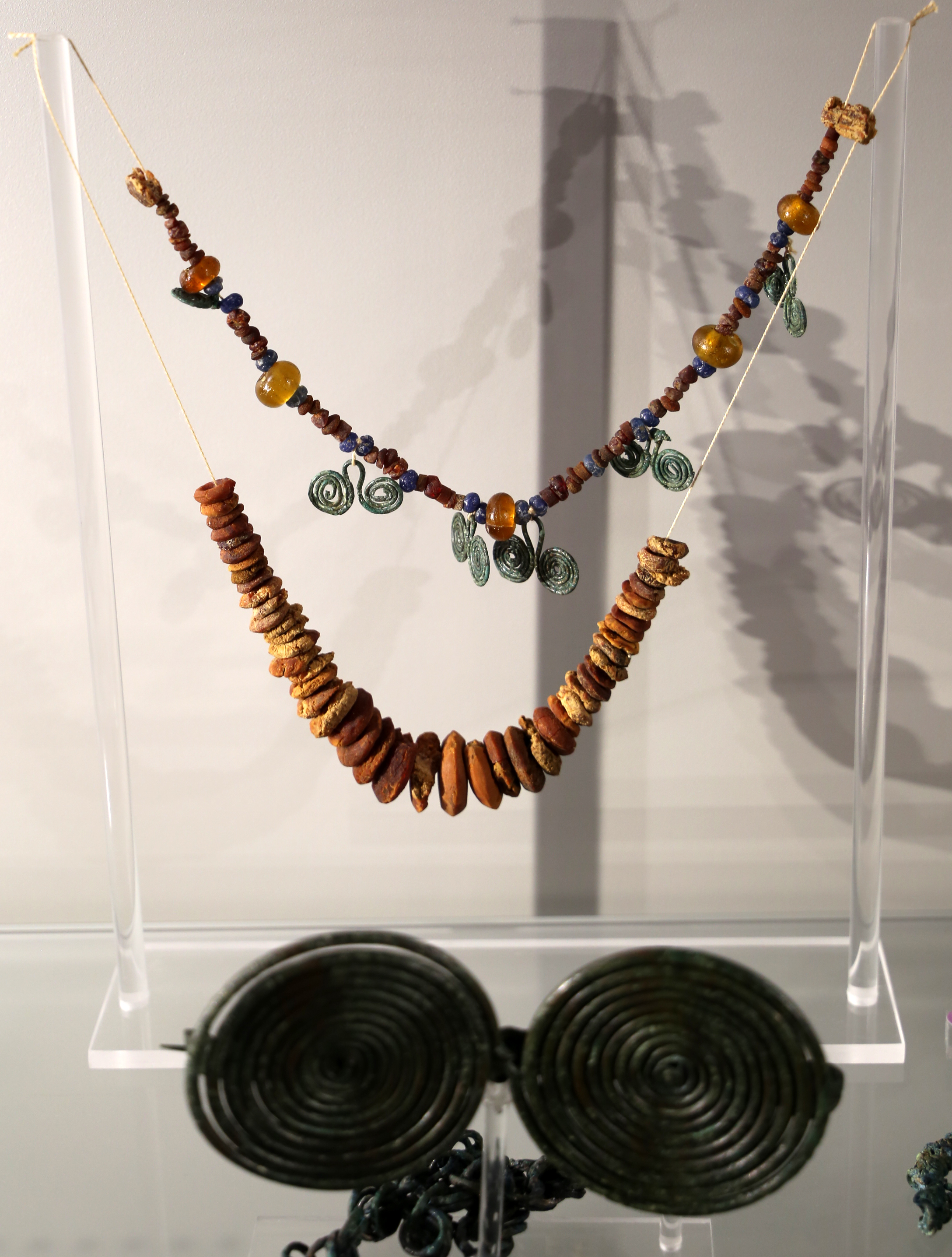
Ornaments, c. 800-700 BC

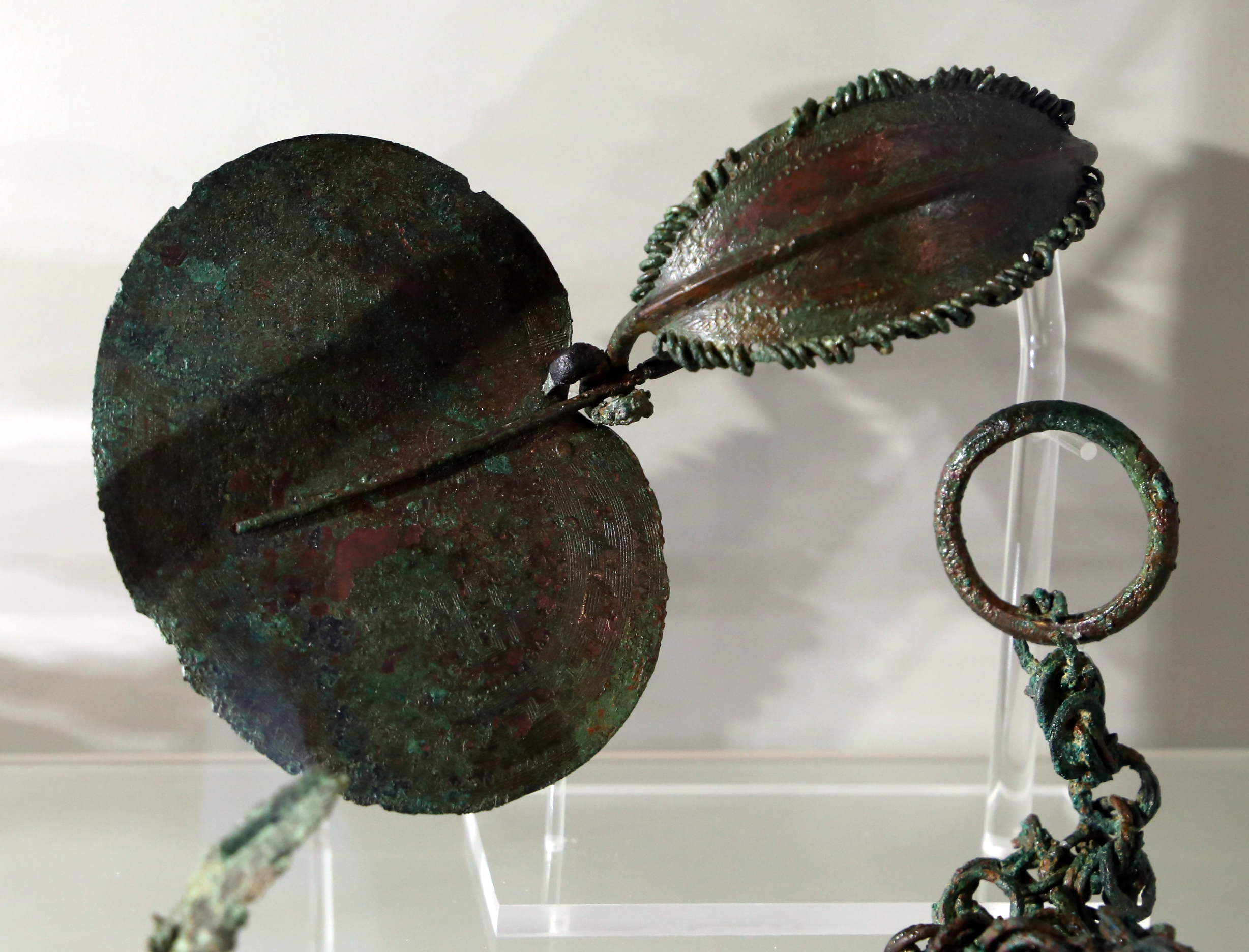
Ornaments, c. 800-700 BC

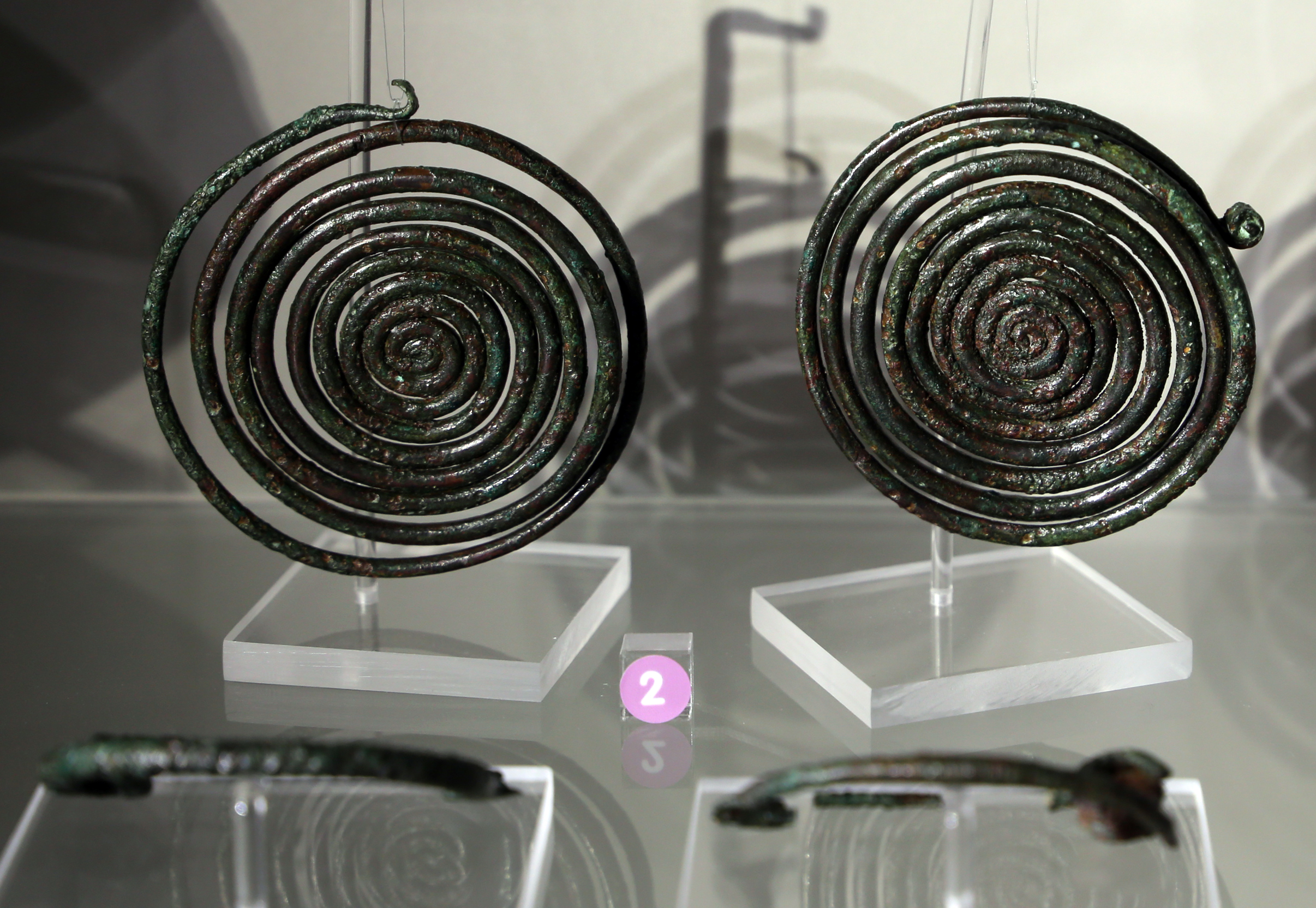
Bronze ornaments, c. 800-700 BC

== See also ==
- Ancient peoples of Italy
- Hostus Hostilius
- Sabino dialect

== Sources ==
=== Ancient ===
- Ovid, Fasti (Book III, 167–258)
- Ovid, Ars Amatoria (Book I, 102)
- Livy, Ab urbe condita (Book I, 9–14)
- Cicero, De Republica (Book II, 12–14)
- Plutarch, Parallel Lives (Romulus, 14–20)
- Juvenal, Satires (Book III, 81–85)
- Maras, Daniele F.; Michetti, Laura Maria; Smith, Christopher J.; Tassi Scandone, Elena (2023). Fontes antiqui Sabinorum. I Sabini e la Sabina nelle fonti letteraie greche e latine. Rome: L'Erma di Bretschneider. ISBN 978-88-913-2743-7.

=== Modern ===
- Donaldson, John William (1860). "Chapter IV: The Sabello-Oscan Language". Varronianus: A Critical and Historical Introduction to the Ethnography of Ancient Italy and the Philological Study of the Latin Language. London: John W. Parker and Son.
- Salmon, ET (1967). Samnium and the Samnites. London: Cambridge University Press.
- Pokorny, Julius (2005) [1959]. Indogermanisches etymologisches Woerterbuch. Leiden: Leiden University Indo-European Etymological Dictiopnary (IEED) Project. Archived from the original on 2006-09-27.
