= Trebula Mutusca =

- Trebula
- Location within Italy
- 42°13′39.61″N 12°52′7.14″E
- Periods: Ancient Roman to High Medieval
- Location: Monteleone Sabino
- Region: Latium

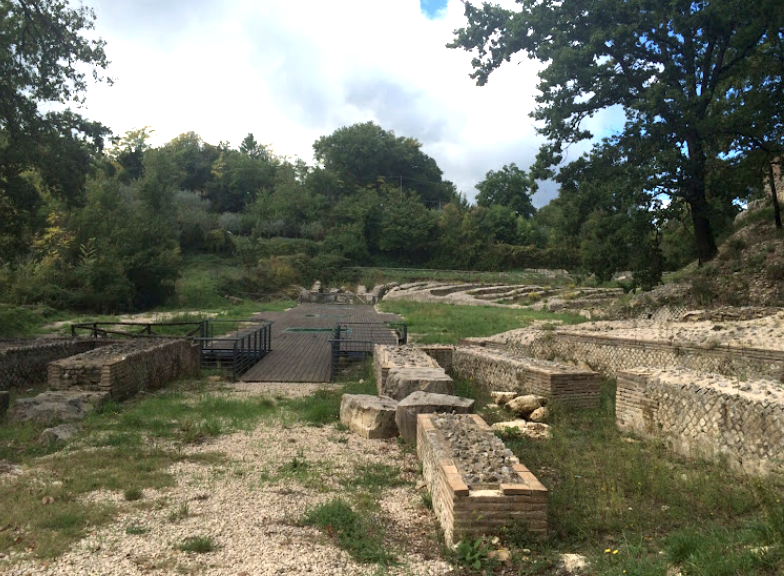
amphitheatre

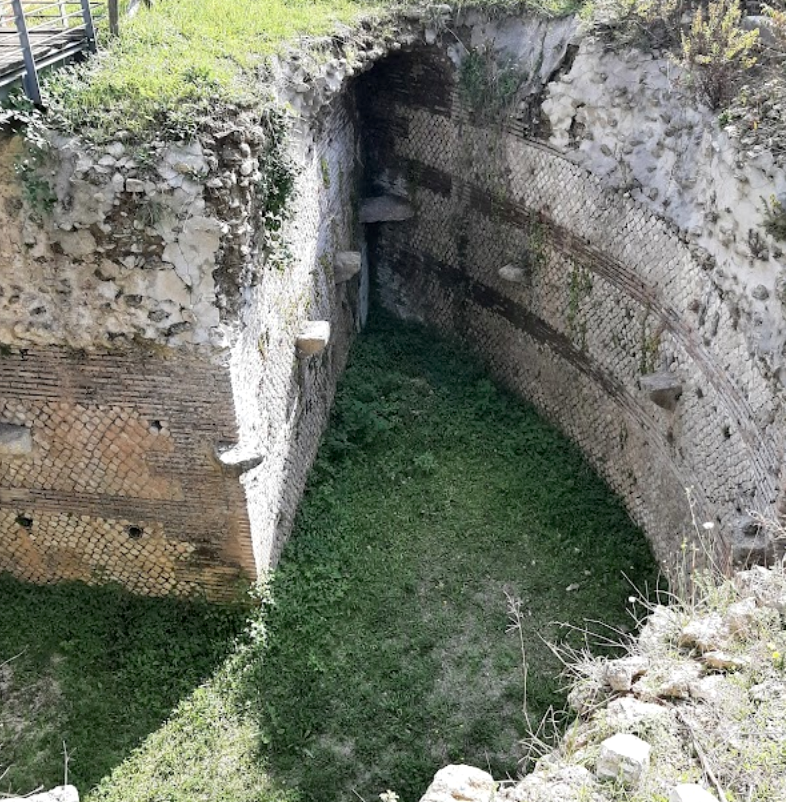
amphitheatre

Trebula Mutusca (also spelled Trebula Mutuesca or simply Mutuscae) was an ancient city of the Sabines. It is located at Monteleone Sabino, a village about 3 km to the east of the Via Salaria.

Pliny mentions both Sabine cities named Trebula: Trebulani qui cognominantur Mutuscaei, et qui Suffenates. As this seems to have been much the more important of the two Trebula (the other being Trebula Suffenas), it is probably that meant by Strabo, who mentions Trebula without any distinctive adjunct but in conjunction with Eretum. The Liber Coloniarumn also mentions a "Tribule", municipium which is probably the same place. Martial also alludes to Trebula as situated among cold and damp mountain valleys, but it is not certain to which he refers.

Virgil speaks of Mutusca as abounding in olives (oliviferaeque Mutuscae), which is still the case with the neighbourhood of Monteleone Sabino, and a village near it consequently bears the name of Oliveto.

Several inscriptions have also been found here, some of which bear the name of its people, Plebs Trebulana, Trebulani Mutuscani, and Trebulani Mut..

The archaeological museum at Monteleone Sabino contains many exhibits particularly from the temple.

== History ==
In the 4th century BC there was a sanctuary dedicated to the goddess Feronia located in the centre of the natural depression now called Pantano, which was probably frequented by the populations who lived in huts on the nearby hilltops.

The region was conquered by the Romans in 290 BC under Manius Curius Dentatus. A real village emerged in the 3rd century, born by its strategic position along the Via Salaria. The romanisation of Sabina encouraged synecism (grouping of small towns into one) so that in Augustan era the town developed with its organisation, public offices and its centre, with the Forum, the baths and other public buildings after becoming a municipium.

In the first half of the 2nd c. AD important and impressive buildings were erected with the support of the powerful senatorial family of the area, the Brutti Praesentes, notably the amphitheatre, baths and forum built on a terrace.

The history of the temple can be divided into several stages: foundation 265 - 240 BC; restoration of the portico end of the 2nd century BC; construction of a hearth end of the 1st century BC; reuse with the construction of probable workshops end of the 1st/2nd century AD; abandonment 5th century AD.

== The Site ==
There are considerable ruins here including those of a amphitheatre, thermae (baths) and portions of the ancient road.

Excavations from 2000 uncovered the porch of the temple of Feronia originally made from wood, that was replaced later by walls of travertine and bricks.

In 2022 at nearby Castellano, an imposing rectangular cistern 100 m long, almost 5 m wide and high, fed by 10 wells and with a capacity of about 80,000 litres was discovered. It is a castellum aquae, with 3 chambers from which lead pipes led the water towards the Forum and the town, with a reverse siphon system. It was built in the first century BC before the reorganisation works of the area which took place under Trajan.
