= Afrania gens =

Families in ancient Rome

The gens Afrania was a plebeian family at Rome, which is first mentioned in the second century BC. The first member of this gens to achieve prominence was Gaius Afranius Stellio, who became praetor in 185 BC.

== Origin ==
The nomen Afranius belongs to a class of gentilicia derived from surnames ending in -anus, typically derived from place names. The Afranii may have been of Picentine origin. Lucius Afranius, who held the consulship in 60 BC, was from Picenum, and a Titus Afranius or Afrenius was one of the leaders of the allies during the Social War.

== Praenomina ==
The main praenomina used by the Afranii were Lucius, Publius, Gaius, Gnaeus and Sextus. There are also several occurrences of Marcus and Quintus, while other praenomina occur infrequently, with individual instances of Aulus, Spurius, and Titus.

== Branches and cognomina ==
The only cognomen of the Afranii in the time of the Republic is Stellio, referring to a spotted newt or lizard, perhaps with the implication that the bearer was crafty. Other surnames are found under the Empire.

== Members ==
This list includes abbreviated praenomina. For an explanation of this practice, see filiation.

- Gaius Afranius Stellio, praetor in 185 BC, and triumvir for founding a colony in 183.
- Gaius Afranius C. f. Stellio, served in the war against Perseus, and was taken captive at the surrender of the Roman garrison at Uscana, 169 BC.
- Lucius Afranius, a comic poet, who lived at the beginning of the first century BC.
- Titus Afranius, one of the leaders of the Italian confederates in the Social War.
- Lucius Afranius A. f., legate of Gnaeus Pompeius, and consul in 60 BC.
- Spurius Afranius, appears on coins.
- Marcus Afranius, appears on coins.
- Gaia Afrania, wife of the senator Licinius Buccio.
- Lucius Afranius L. l. Buccio, a freedman named in an inscription from Rome.
- Lucius Afranius L. f. A. n., negotiated with Caesar in Hispania for his life and that of his father.
- Publius Afranius Potitus, having vowed to sacrifice himself in order to bring about the recovery of Caligula from an illness, was cruelly put to death by the emperor to fulfill the promise.
- Sextus Afranius Burrus, a general in the time of Claudius, who served as tutor and advisor to the emperor Nero. When he refused to assist Nero in ridding himself of his mother, and then his wife, the emperor had Burrus poisoned, in AD 62.
- Afranius Quintianus, a senator, was compelled to commit suicide as a result of his part in Piso's conspiracy against Nero in AD 65.
- Sextus Afranius Prifernas, named in a funerary inscription from Rome, dating to AD 70.
- Gnaeus Afranius Dexter, a friend of the epigrammatist Marcus Valerius Martialis, was consul suffectus from the Kalends of May in AD 105. He was murdered in early July.
- Publius Afranius Apthorus, named in a list of donors at Veleia dating to the reign of Trajan.
- Afranius Priscus, named in a list of donors at Veleia in the reign of Trajan.
- Afrania Musa, named in a list of donors at Veleia in the reign of Trajan.
- Publius Afranius Flavianus, consul in AD 117.
- Gnaeus Afranius, the grandfather of Gnaeus Afranius Priscus Sabinianus.
- Gnaeus Afranius Sabinus, the father of Gnaeus Afranius Priscus Sabinianus.
- Gnaeus Afranius Cn. f. Cn. f. Priscus Sabinianus, buried at Aesernia in Samnium, during the second century AD.
- Lucius Afranius L. f. Sedatus, a native of Sutrium, was a soldier in the praetorian guard in AD 197.
- Gaius Afranius Victor, one of the vigiles in the time of Septimius Severus.
- Marcus Afranius Hannibal, tribune of a cohort in the thirtieth legion in Pannonia, some time in the late third century.
- Afranius Hannibalianus, a senator and military officer, consul in AD 292.
- Eutropia, possibly the sister of Afranius Hannibalianus.
- Afranius Syagrius, consul in AD 382.

=== Imperial Afranii of uncertain date ===
- Afrania L. l., daughter of Urania, a freedwoman, buried at Narbo, aged eleven.
- Gnaeus Afranius, the father of Gnaeus Afranius Bromius.
- Lucius Afranius, named in an inscription from Begastrum in Hispania Citerior.
- Publius Afranius, the former master of Publius Afranius Hermes and Afrania Romana.
- Publius Afranius, the father of Publius Afranius Secundus.
- Quintus Afranius, named in an inscription from Rome.
- Quintus Afranius, the former master of Quintus Afranius Cresimus.
- Gaius Afranius Apollinaris, a soldier in the praetorian guard.
- Gnaeus Afranius Cn. f. Bromius, the husband of Numisia Marcella, buried at Aufidenia in Samnium.
- Lucius Afranius Cerealis, the former master of Lucius Afranius Eros and Afrania Procilla.
- Lucius Afranius Clementianus, buried at Thugga in Africa Proconsularis.
- Lucius Afranius Corinthus, named in a funerary inscription from Brundisium.
- Quintus Afranius Q. l. Cresimus, named in an inscription from Rome.
- Lucius Afranius L. l. Eros, a freedman, and the husband of Afrania Procilla, was one of the Sodales Augustales at Tarraco in Hispania Tarraconensis.
- Marcus Afranius Euporius, one of the Sodales at Olisipo.
- Sextus Afranius Firmus, named in a libationary inscription from Carnuntum in Pannonia Superior.
- Lucius Afranius Fortunatianus, buried at Thugga, aged seventeen.
- Gnaeus Afranius Hermes, buried at Portus.
- Publius Afranius P. l. Hermes, the husband of Afrania Romana, was a freedman buried at Rome.
- Afrania Hermione, named in an inscription from Rome.
- Afrania Hilara, buried at Carnuntum, aged twenty-five.
- Quintus Afranius Ingenuus, buried at Thuburnica in Africa Proconsularis, aged eighty-five.
- Lucius Afranius Ipocrates, freedman of Galliopa, buried at Belianes in Hispania Citerior, aged thirty-six.
- Sextus Afranius S. f. Lautus, son of Afrania Prote, buried at Rome, aged ten years, nine months, and four days.
- Publius Afranius Major, a soldier in the fifteenth legion, named in a funerary inscription from Carnuntum.
- Lucius Afranius Maritimus, husband of Julia Severa and father of Lucius Afranius Severus.
- Sextus Afranius Optatus, named in a funerary inscription from Rome.
- Sextus Afranius Philetus, buried at Tarquinii, aged fifty-six.
- Gaius Afranius Plocamus, named in an inscription from Rome.
- Afrania L. l. Procilla, a freedwoman, and the wife of Lucius Afranius Eros.
- Afrania Prote, mother of Sextus Afranius Lautus.
- Afrania P. l. Romana, wife of Publius Afranius Hermes, was a freedwoman buried at Rome, aged twenty-two years, seven months.
- Publius Afranius P. f. Secundus, a native of Hadrumetum, was buried at Lambaesis in Numidia, aged seventeen years, twenty-eight days.
- Sextus Afranius Serenus, named in a funerary inscription from Rome.
- Lucius Afranius Successus, buried at Thugga, aged forty-seven.
- Lucius Afranius L. f. Severus, son of Lucius Afranius Maritimus and Julia Severa, buried at Albintimilium in Liguria, aged fourteen.
- Lucius Afranius Victor, a veteran of the third legion, buried at the present site of Mechta Tafsa, formerly part of Mauretania Caesariensis.
- Publius Afranius Victor, husband of Claudia Ingenua, a centurion buried at Matrica in Pannonia Inferior, aged fifty.

== See also ==
- List of Roman gentes

== Bibliography ==
- Marcus Tullius Cicero, Brutus, De Finibus Bonorum et Malorum, Epistulae ad Atticum, Philippicae.
- Gaius Julius Caesar, Commentarii de Bello Civili (Commentaries on the Civil War).
- Aulus Hirtius (attributed), De Bello Africo (On the African War).
- Quintus Horatius Flaccus (Horace), Epistulae.
- Titus Livius (Livy), History of Rome.
- Marcus Velleius Paterculus, Compendium of Roman History.
- Valerius Maximus, Factorum ac Dictorum Memorabilium (Memorable Facts and Sayings).
- Marcus Valerius Martialis (Martial), Epigrammata (Epigrams).
- Marcus Fabius Quintilianus (Quintilian), Institutio Oratoria (Institutes of Oratory).
- Gaius Plinius Caecilius Secundus (Pliny the Younger), Epistulae (Letters).
- Plutarchus, Lives of the Noble Greeks and Romans.
- Publius Cornelius Tacitus, Annales.
- Gaius Suetonius Tranquillus, De Vita Caesarum (Lives of the Caesars, or The Twelve Caesars).
- Lucius Annaeus Florus, Epitome de T. Livio Bellorum Omnium Annorum DCC (Epitome of Livy: All the Wars of Seven Hundred Years).
- Appianus Alexandrinus (Appian), Bellum Civile (The Civil War).
- Aulus Gellius, Noctes Atticae (Attic Nights).
- Lucius Cassius Dio Cocceianus (Cassius Dio), Roman History.
- Sextus Aurelius Victor, De Viris Illustribus (On Famous Men).
- Decimius Magnus Ausonius, Epigrammata de Diversis Rebus (Epigrams about Various Things).
- Ambrosius Theodosius Macrobius, Saturnalia.
- Digesta, or Pandectae (The Digest).
- Joseph Hilarius Eckhel, Doctrina Numorum Veterum (The Study of Ancient Coins, 1792–1798).
- Friedrich Heinrich Bothe, Poëtae Scenici Latinorum Fragmenta (Fragments of the Latin Theatrical Poets), Heinrich Vogler, Halberstadt (1822).
- Johann Heinrich Neukirch, De Fabula Togata Romanorum (The Fabula Togata of the Romans), Weidmann, Leipzig (1833).
- Dictionary of Greek and Roman Biography and Mythology, William Smith, ed., Little, Brown and Company, Boston (1849).
- Theodor Mommsen et alii, Corpus Inscriptionum Latinarum (The Body of Latin Inscriptions, abbreviated CIL), Berlin-Brandenburgische Akademie der Wissenschaften (1853–present).
- Ettore Pais, Corporis Inscriptionum Latinarum Supplementa Italica (Italian Supplement to the Corpus Inscriptionum Latinarum), Rome (1884).
- Bulletin Archéologique du Comité des Travaux Historiques et Scientifiques (Archaeological Bulletin of the Committee on Historic and Scientific Works, abbreviated BCTH), Imprimerie Nationale, Paris (1885–1973).
- René Cagnat et alii, L'Année épigraphique (The Year in Epigraphy, abbreviated AE), Presses Universitaires de France (1888–present).
- George Davis Chase, "The Origin of Roman Praenomina", in Harvard Studies in Classical Philology, vol. VIII (1897).
- Stéphane Gsell, Inscriptions Latines de L'Algérie (Latin Inscriptions from Algeria, abbreviated ILAlg), Edouard Champion, Paris (1922–present).
- T. Robert S. Broughton, The Magistrates of the Roman Republic, American Philological Association (1952).
- John C. Traupman, The New College Latin & English Dictionary, Bantam Books, New York (1995).
- M. Khanoussi, L. Maurin, Mourir à Dougga: Receuil des inscriptions funéraires (Dying in Dougga: a Compendium of Funerary Inscriptions, abbreviated MAD), Bordeaux, Tunis (2002).
