= March on Rome (88 BC) =

Sulla's coup against the Roman Republic

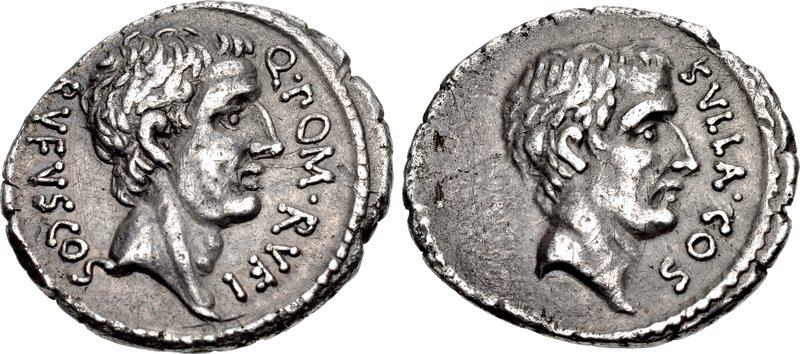
Portraits of Sulla (right) and Pompeius Rufus (left), the two consuls who led the march, on a denarius minted by their grandson in 54 BC.

The March on Rome of 88 BC was a coup d'état by the consul of the Roman Republic Lucius Cornelius Sulla, who seized power against his enemies Marius and Sulpicius, after they had ousted him from Rome. It was the first time in Roman history that a general ordered his army to march against the Republic.

In 88 BC, Sulla was elected consul and given the command of the war against the king of Pontus Mithridates, who had recently invaded the Roman province of Asia. The same year, Sulla and his colleague Quintus Pompeius Rufus opposed the attempt of the tribune of the plebs Publius Sulpicius to enrol the Italians who received the Roman citizenship at the end of the Social War (91–87 BC). To bypass the consuls' opposition, Sulpicius sought the support of the popular Gaius Marius, who had already been consul six times. Marius demanded for his help that Sulpicius pass a law transferring Sulla's command to him. Using armed gangs to intimidate the tribal assembly, Sulpicius removed Pompeius' consulship and forced Sulla to flee from Rome, after which he enrolled the Italians and gave the Mithridatic command to Marius.

Meanwhile, Sulla had returned to the legions he had assembled for the expedition against Mithridates. He convinced his soldiers to follow him in an operation against Marius and Sulpicius. Joined by Pompeius, Sulla marched against Rome and easily defeated the militia recruited by his enemies. Sulla immediately passed a law declaring Sulpicius, Marius, and ten other leaders as public enemies, thereby encouraging their murder. Only Sulpicius was caught; Marius and the others could escape to Africa and Spain. With Rome secured, Sulla started an overhaul of the Roman constitution according to his firm conservative beliefs. He passed several laws that weakened the powers of the tribunes of the plebs while enhancing those of the curule magistrates and the senate, whose membership was also doubled.

Sulla's settlement was nevertheless short-lived. First, his candidates lost the elections for 87 BC. Then, as soon as he left to fight Mithridates, his enemies coalesced around the consul for 87 BC Lucius Cornelius Cinna, who likewise marched on Rome against the other consul during the Bellum Octavianum. Cinna recalled the outlaws, including Marius, then cancelled all Sulla's laws and assumed Sulpicius' program. The inevitable confrontation between the two factions took place in 83 BC, when Sulla came back from the East, in a civil war, won by Sulla, who thereafter became dictator and re-enacted his previous laws.

== Background ==
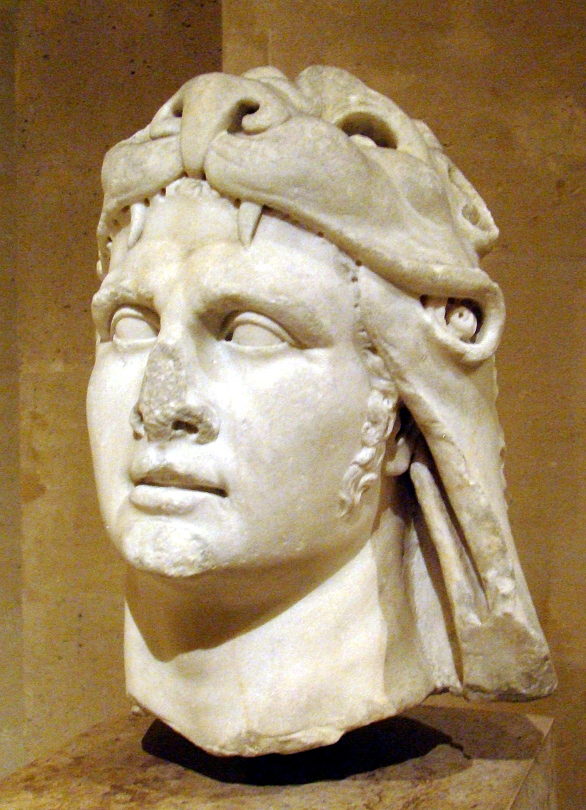
Bust of Mithridates VI in the Louvre.

Sulla was an ambitious politician who had won fame by making several bold military moves, such as the capture of Jugurtha during the Jugurthine War and the battle of Vercellae of during the Cimbrian War. He was elected praetor in 97, then left as propraetor to Cappadocia to put Ariobarzanes on the throne of that kingdom. On his return, he was accused of corruption by Gaius Marcius Censorinus, perhaps acting on behalf of Gaius Marius, his former commander. Sulla then disappears from the sources for 5 years, perhaps because he thought he had no chance to become consul. He is found again in 90 as a legate during the Social War, against Rome's former Italian allies. This war was difficult for Rome, who needed up to fifteen legions in Italy to quell the revolt. Fighting on the southern theatre, Sulla was one of the two main generals who won the war, earning the devotion of his army. His ability was recognised by the Caecilii Metelli, one of the dominant families of the time, who sealed an alliance with his marriage to Caecilia Metella. This powerful backing, combined with his military fame, enabled his election to the consulship in December 89 for the following year (88). The other consul was also his friend Quintus Pompeius Rufus, who married his son with Sulla's daughter.

After entering office, Sulla was granted the command of the war against the king of Pontus Mithridates, who had taken advantage of the Social War to capture Roman possessions in the Greek East. An eastern command was coveted by every Roman politician, because of the enormous wealth it would bring them. This command looked so attractive that two ineligible candidates had even tried to force their way through in the elections: Gaius Julius Caesar Strabo and Gnaeus Pompeius Strabo.

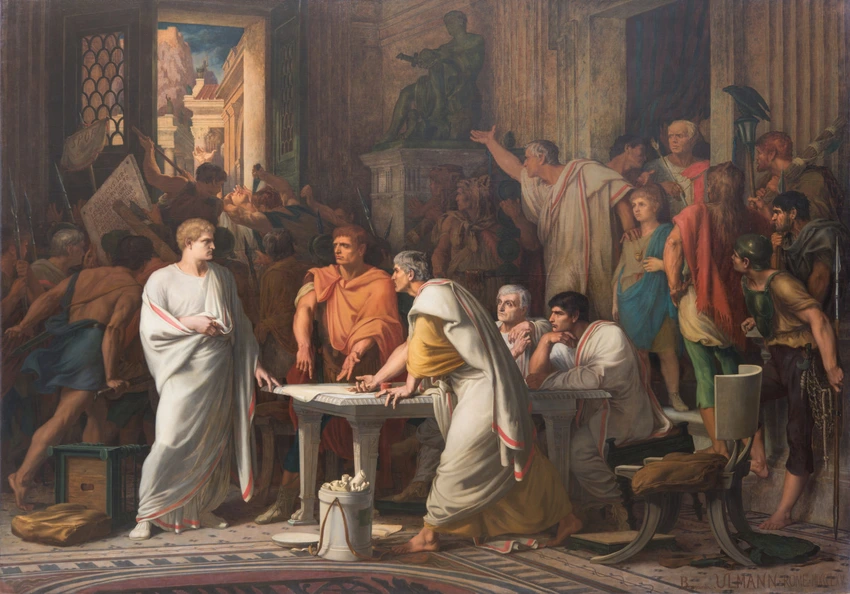
Modern depiction of the moment when Sulla found shelter in Marius' house, by Benjamin Ulmann (c.1866). Now in the Orsay Museum, Paris.

Sulla faced another challenge from Publius Sulpicius, a tribune of the plebs the same year as him. Sulpicius wanted to pass a law in favour of the Italians who had received the citizenship in 90 thanks to the lex Julia, but had not yet been registered in the Roman tribes. His bill distributed the Italians, as well as freedmen, evenly among the Roman tribes, a move which would have considerably altered the Roman electorate. A powerful orator and ambitious politician, Sulpicius was initially a friend of the consul Pompeius Rufus and had decisively prevented Caesar Strabo from running against Sulla, maybe to attract the latter's goodwill so he would not challenge his Italian bill. Sulpicius was however wrong; both consuls opposed his bill distributing the new Italian citizens in the old Roman tribes (Sulla and the conservatives would have rather gathered the Italians into a few tribes, so that old citizens would have kept a majority of the tribes). Not willing to give up his plan, Sulpicius then turned to Marius for support. Like the other main politicians of the period, the old general, six times consul and very influential among the equites and Italian gentry, wanted the command against Mithridates, and also to settle some old grudges against Sulla. In exchange for supporting the Italian bill, Marius requested Sulpicius to pass a law transferring the Eastern command from Sulla to him. This alliance probably took place in April–May 88.

Sulpicius assembled a large bodyguard of 600 equites and a private army of 3,000 men, probably to avoid the same fate as previous revolutionary tribunes—such as the Gracchi and Saturninus—and to intimidate voters. The consuls Sulla and Rufus ordered a suspension of business (justitium) to prevent Sulpicius' Italian bill from being voted. In return, Sulpicius provoked a riot with his gangs that killed Pompeius' son and forced Sulla to seek shelter into the house of Marius, who apparently negotiated his survival on the condition that he cancelled the justitium, which would let the Italian bill pass. Marius also allowed Sulla to leave Rome in order to finish the siege of Nola in Campania, one of the last pockets of resistance of the Social War. Sulpicius then passed the bills enrolling the Italians and giving Marius the Eastern command; the latter having been kept secret so far. He also deposed the second consul, Pompeius Rufus, although a minority of scholars reject this part. These bills broke many constitutional practices; the most outstanding one was the transfer of the eastern command from a consul to a privatus (Marius), a citizen that did not hold any magistracy—an unprecedented occurrence.

== March on Rome ==
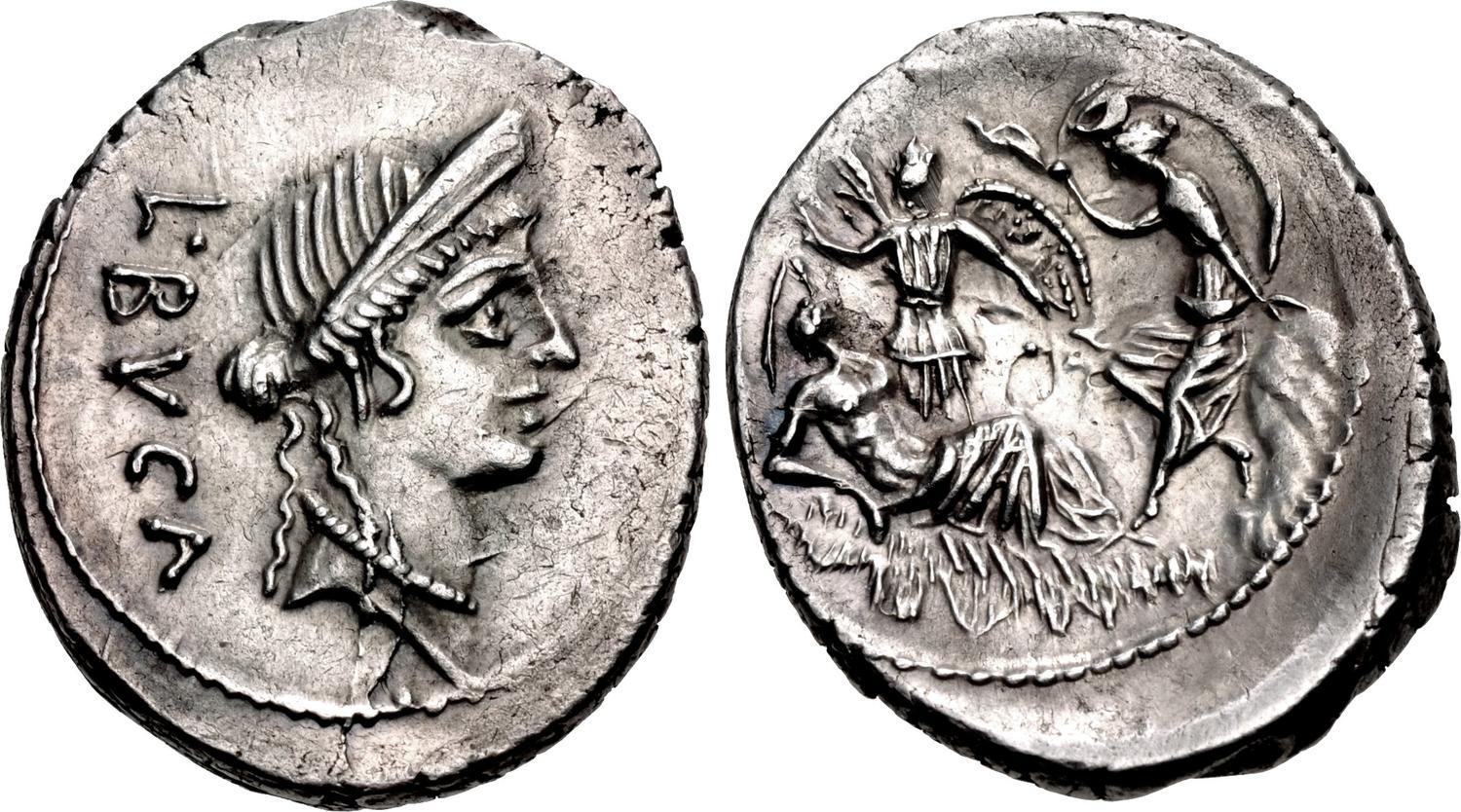
Denarius minted by Lucius Aemilius Buca, a descendant of Sulla, in 44 BC. The obverse depicts Venus, the patron goddess of Sulla, whereas the reverse shows the dream of Sulla, which took place the night before he entered Rome.

Sulla learnt he lost the Eastern command at Nola. He had to react against Sulpicius and Marius if he wanted to save his career. Because of the Social War, he was in the unusual position to have a massive experienced army at his disposal not far from Rome. Sulla was already popular among his soldiers, since he had received from them the grass crown during the Social War the previous year. Ernst Badian even speaks of Sulla's legions as his "private client army". Apparently, Sulla did not present his intentions to his soldiers; he skilfully let them take the decision to march on Rome by themselves. He told his troops that if Marius was appointed, he would recruit a new army to fight Mithridates, which means that the soldiers in Sulla's army would too lose their share of the Eastern booty. Since his soldiers were mostly landless and in need of cash, this argument secured their support for a coup. Sulla likely presented his march as a legitimate police operation of the consuls against a tribune of the plebs who usurped his rights. The decision to march on Rome became unavoidable when the soldiers stoned to death the military tribunes that Marius had sent to take over his army, as well as the legate Marcus Gratidius, a relative of Marius. This event showed that the soldiers only recognised Sulla as their leader and did not hesitate to use violence against his enemies. However, Sulla's plan was firmly opposed by all the officers of his staff but one, identified by modern scholars as Lucullus, who was at the time quaestor, and Sulla's closest political ally for the remaining of his life. Sulla notably dedicated his memoirs to him. The other consul Pompeius Rufus also joined Sulla a bit later; he too had been deprived of his position by Sulpicius. In his Memoirs, Sulla mentioned a significant number of portents that intervened in his decision to attack Rome, such as a haruspex named Postumius who predicted his victory and a dream Sulla had in which the goddess Bellona appeared to him striking his enemies. This dream later became a central element of Sulla's propaganda. In 44 BC, one of his descendants, Lucius Aemilius Buca, minted a denarius that has been interpreted by some numismatists as a depiction of Sulla's dream.

The march began in August, soon after the murder of Gratidius and the tribunes, with the two consuls at the head of the six legions that had been encamped in Campania, so at least 36,000 veterans. Sulla's move on the city was overwhelmingly rejected at Rome. Under the control of Marius and Sulpicius, the senate dispatched an embassy, which counted the praetors Marcus Junius Brutus (a known supporter of Marius) and a Servilius, to ask why Sulla was marching against his fatherland, to which he replied that was going to free Rome from the tyrants, a rhetoric used by the assassins of the Gracchi. Thereafter his soldiers mistreated the embassy by breaking the praetors' fasces and tearing their togae, the symbols of their authority. Marius and Sulpicius had never expected Sulla to use his legions to attack them in Rome. As a result, Rome had no troops to defend itself against Sulla's army. Marius tried to gain some time to organise the defence by sending two other embassies, in front of whom Sulla faked a halt of his march. While he was pretending to build a camp, he had dispatched two of his military tribunes, Lucius Minucius Basilus and Gaius Mummius, with the cavalry and some light troops to seize the Esquiline Gate, on the eastern wall of Rome. As soon as the senatorial legation left, he resumed his march.

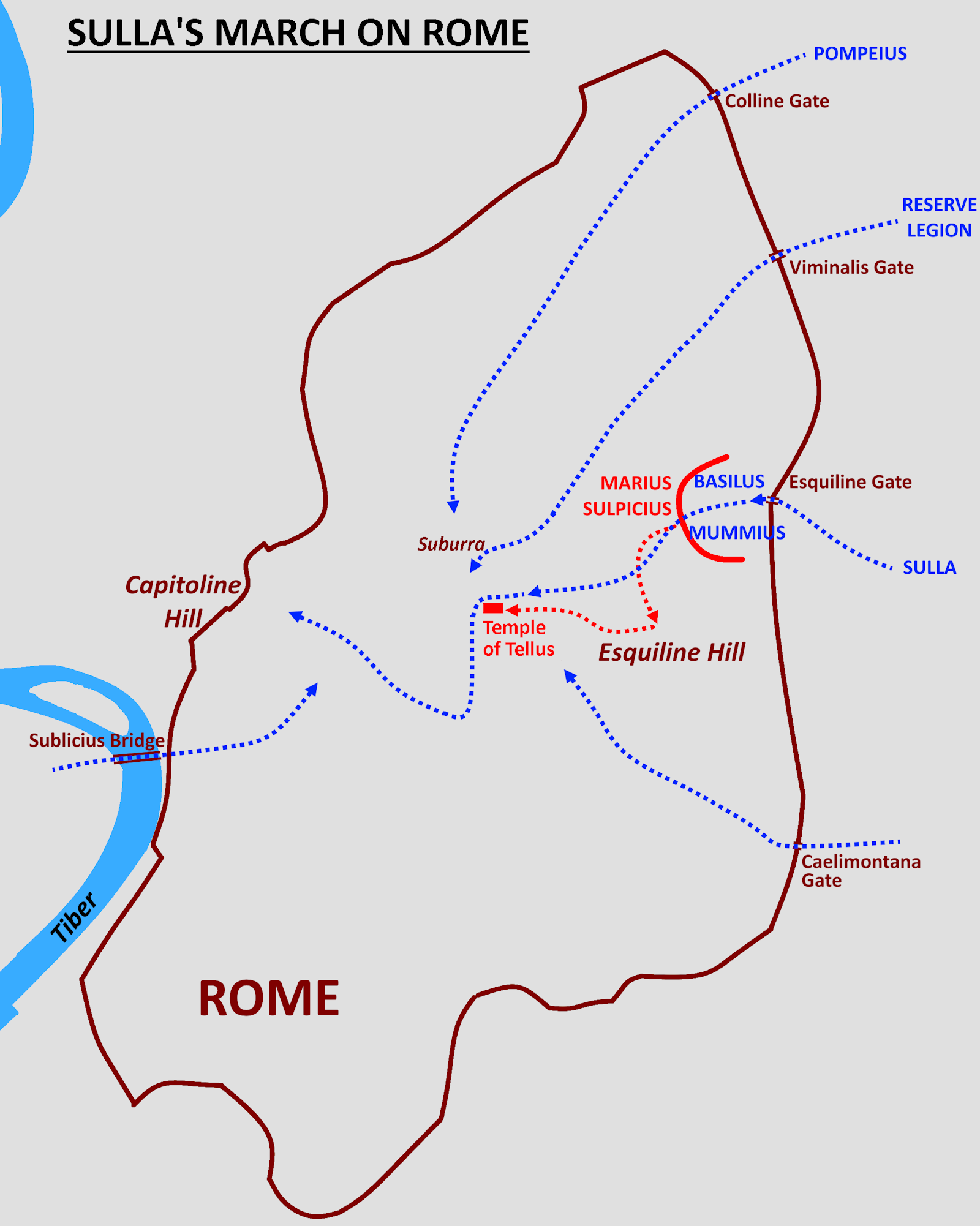
Map of Sulla's capture of Rome.

Sulla's plan to capture Rome was to send Pompeius Rufus with one legion through the Colline Gate, the most northern gate. Two legions were ordered to take the Caelimontana gate in the south-east and the Pons Sublicius in the south-west. One legion was left in reserve while Sulla himself with two legions entered through the Esquiline Gate, where he met with his legates Basilus and Mummius. As Marius knew that he could not win the fight against Sulla's overwhelming forces, his plan was to force Sulla's legions into a difficult street fight, so that his soldiers would have second thoughts about the sacrilege they were committing. The defenders climbed on the roofs and threw tiles on Sulla's soldiers on ground level. Sulla set the houses on fire to clear the roofs, then ordered the reserve legion to go through the Viminalis gate (between the Colline and Esquiline gates) to take Suburra, the large neighbourhood in the centre of Rome. Seeing that Sulla's legions were moving behind their back, Marius and Sulpicius retreated to the Oppian Hill and the Temple of Tellus, where they promised the local slaves freedom if they fought for them. As no slave followed them, Marius, Sulpicius, and the other leaders opposed to Sulla had no choice but to flee during the night.

Sulla ensured that his legions remained under control by executing a few soldiers who had looted some houses, then spread his troops over the city for the night to maintain order. Both consuls stayed awake throughout the night to keep an eye on their soldiers. Sulla wanted to send the message to the population that he had come to free the city, not to conquer it.

== The twelve hostes ==
The next day, the consuls called the senate to have Marius and Sulpicius outlawed in order to justify the march. Quintus Mucius Scaevola, consul in 117 and a distinguished jurist, was the only senator to speak against Sulla; he was a friend of Marius and his granddaughter Licinia was married to Marius' son. As nobody else dared to oppose Sulla, the senate approved a list of twelve people who were declared hostes, "foreign enemies", another constitutional precedent. It means that they could be killed without consequences and their properties seized. The senatus consultum was followed by a law condemning the hostes. The word hostis meant public enemy in Sulla's time, but its original meaning in Old Latin was foreigner. Therefore, Sulla employed this word to associate Marius and his followers with foreign enemies, in order to justify his use of Roman legions against Rome, as they were normally only employed against foreign armies. The official reasons given by Sulla for condemning the hostes was the troubles caused by gangs of Sulpicius, his violence against the consuls, and Marius' and Sulpicius' promise of manumission to the slaves during the fight against Sulla.

Immediately after the senatorial vote, Sulla sent his cavalry and bounty hunters to pursue the twelve hostes. The most complete list of these twelve hostes is found in the book on the civil wars written by Appian, a Greek historian of the 2nd century AD, who gives nine names, while Cicero tells the name of another.

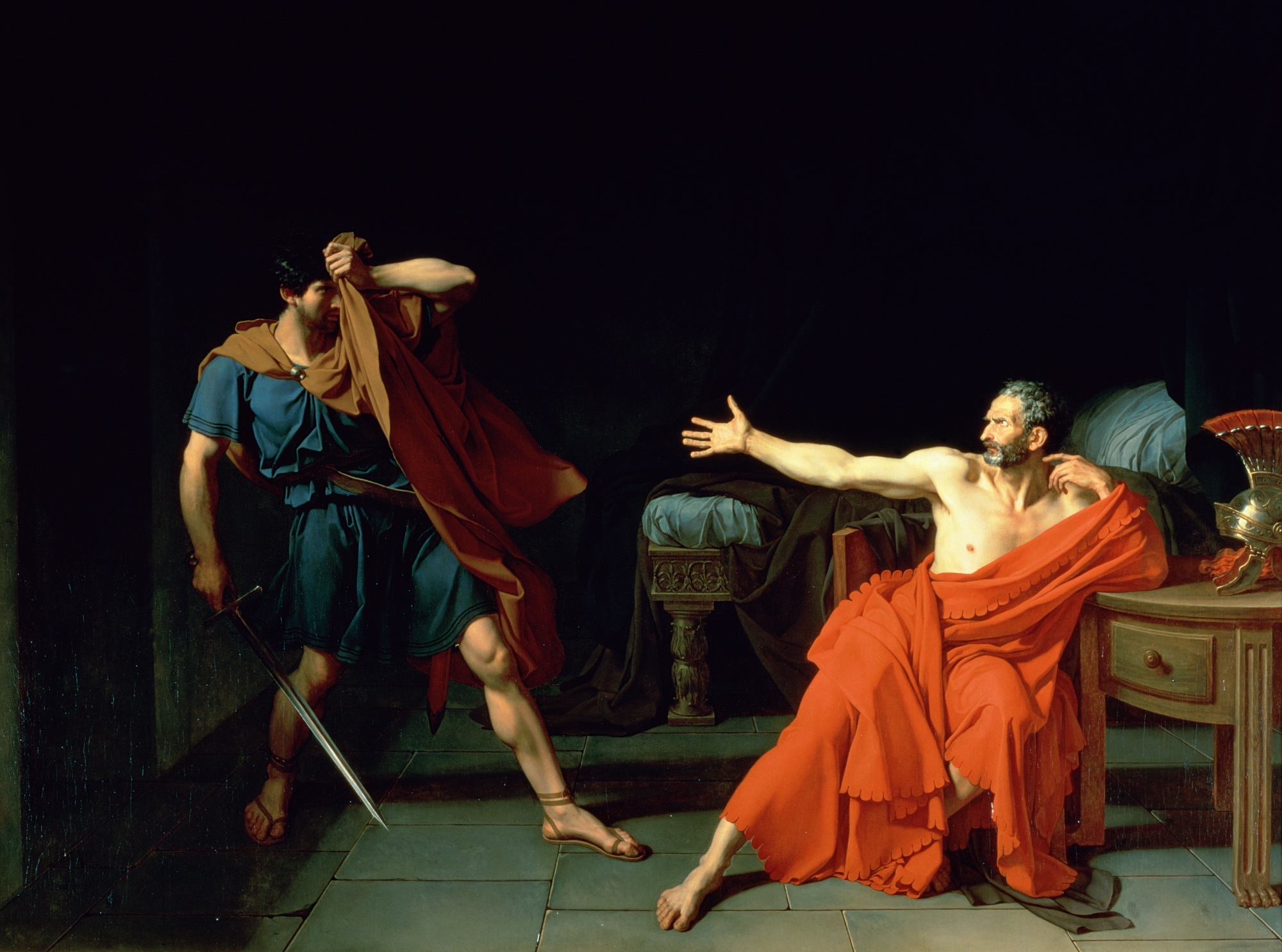
Modern painting of Marius intimidating a bounty hunter sent by Sulla, by Jean Germain Drouais (1786), now in the Louvre.

- Publius Sulpicius, was still tribune of the plebs when declared hostis. He was the only one of the twelve hostes to be killed.
- Gaius Marius, was six time consul at the time. He was captured, but his vast auctoritas allowed his escape to Africa, where many of his veterans lived.
- Gaius Marius minor closely followed his father despite his young age (he was only 22 in 88). He went with him to Africa.
- Publius Cornelius Cethegus was the only patrician of the list; he fled with Marius to Africa. However, he later joined Sulla's side during the civil war and enriched himself thanks to Sulla's proscription. His new wealth made him a very influential senator in the 70s.
- Marcus Junius Brutus was praetor in 88 and in the first embassy sent by the senate to meet Sulla during the March. He fled to Spain, where his family had influence, and was proscribed in 82, after which he committed suicide. He is not the same as the homonymous father of Caesar's assassin.
- Gnaeus Papirius Carbo. Only his praenomen survives in Appian's manuscript, which has been corrupted into "Gnaeus Granius", as a brother of the following entry in the list. Carbo later became consul and one of the main leaders against Sulla during the civil war from 83 to 82. He was proscribed in 82 and murdered by Pompey.
- Quintus Granius. He is generally regarded as a relative of Marius, likely as a child of Julia before her marriage to him, which would mean that Granius was a wealthy man, because his father was able to marry a patrician woman. The possibility also exists that Granius was a bastard son of Marius before his marriage to Julia. He fled with Marius to Africa and was perhaps proscribed in 82.
- Publius Albinovanus, perhaps tribune of the plebs in 88 alongside Sulpicius, he resisted with arms Sulla's entry into Rome. He was from Etruria and a client of Marius. Like Cethegus, he fled to Africa with Marius, but betrayed his faction for Sulla during the civil war.
- Marcus Laetorius is not really known. A member of the family was a radical supporter of Gaius Gracchus in 121 and another was proscribed in 82.
- Quintus Rubrius Varro, the only name given by Cicero. He was probably a delator, the son of a tribune of the plebs in 123 alongside Gaius Gracchus, and may have been related by blood to Gnaeus Papirius Carbo.
- Gaius Marcius Censorinus is not mentioned in ancient sources, but he was a likely victim of Sulla, whom he had prosecuted in 95. He was an extreme supporter of Marius in 87, even beheading the consul Gnaeus Octavius. He was in turn beheaded by Sulla after the battle of the Colline Gate in 82. He was also a triumvir monetalis in 88.
- Servilius, the praetor who tried to stop Sulla's march together with Brutus is another possible victim.

Only Sulpicius was caught after a slave betrayed him. He was killed and beheaded; his head displayed on the rostra in the Forum. The other hostes mostly followed Marius in his escape to Africa, or went to Spain, like Brutus.

== Reforms ==
All the legislation passed by Sulpicius after the Consuls' declaration of the suspension of business was annulled; Sulla was therefore given his command back and Pompeius his consulship, whereas the Italian bill of Sulpicius was also cancelled.

Sulla did not stop at destroying his enemies. He took advantage of his strong position to force significant constitutional reforms, so he would not be similarly relieved from his command while fighting Mithridates. He could also fix the problems he saw in the prevalent power structure of the Republic, even though these changes were made by the force of arms for the first time in its history. He first established the supremacy of the senate over the legislative process, by forcing new bills to be approved by the Senate before being proposed to voters. Sulla was therefore returning to the situation before the lex Hortensia of 287, when the tribunes had to get the authorisation of the senate to carry a bill before the tribal assembly.

Sulla next granted legislative power to the centuriate assembly, where citizens were distributed in classes based on wealth, thus becoming the only assembly that could vote laws. Laws had so far been voted in the tribal assembly, where citizens were organised by tribe, which therefore only retained the function to elect lower magistrates. Interestingly, this reform would have enrolled wealthy Italians into the first centuries, who could therefore yield more influence through their vote in the centuriate assembly than in the tribal assembly. An arrangement that suited Sulla, who had some friends among the Italian nobility. Modern historians have variously interpreted the confused statement by Appian, who did not understand the legislative process of the Roman Republic. Kaj Sandberg suggests that Sulla actually gave the power to consuls and praetors to introduce bills before the tribal assembly, whereas they hitherto could only do so before the centuriate assembly, on matters of war and peace. He adds that this "was one of the most radical changes of political practice ever undertaken in the republican period". These reforms were designed to prevent revolutionary tribunes of the plebs, such as the Gracchi, Saturninus, or more recently Sulpicius, from emerging again.

In order to increase his support in the Senate, Sulla intended to appoint 300 new senators, but probably never implemented this measure. Similarly, he planned to found 12 colonies for the veterans of the Social War, which would have further increased his popularity among soldiers. Sulla finally passed a law cancelling 10% of all debts and fixed a maximum interest rate for future debts, as the capture of Asia by Mithridates, combined with the devastation of the Social War, had triggered a severe economic crisis in Rome. All his reforms were unopposed, thanks to the threatening presence of his faithful soldiers in the city.

Despite the tremendous changes that Sulla made to the Roman constitution, he presented them as restoration of ancestral customs instead of innovations. The swiftness with which Sulla passed several complex laws in quick succession just after having taken Rome shows that there was no improvisation; he had devised his political program for a while and took advantage of his control of the institutions to enforce it. Several scholars have nevertheless doubted that some of these reforms took place in 88, because they are very similar to those Sulla passed during his dictatorship in 82–80. As these reforms are only described by Appian, who was prone to mistakes, some modern historians think they are a duplicate of Sulla's reforms of 82.

== Elections for 87 BC ==
After the coup, Sulla sent his army back to its encampment in Campania. Before leaving to the East, he attempted to influence the elections for 87. However, without his army to scare his opponents, several candidates could speak freely against him, and even support an amnesty of the hostes still alive; the results were thus not in his favour. Voters in the tribes were perhaps shocked by Sulla's coup, the murder of Sulpicius—who was still a sacrosanct tribune of the plebs—and the action against Marius, a popular hero since the Cimbrian War. For example, Sulla's nephew, Sextus Nonius Sufenas, was defeated for the aedileship, whereas a relative of Marius and the murdered legate Gratidius, Marcus Marius Gratidianus, was elected tribune of the plebs at the end of September. The other new tribunes were in majority hostile to Sulla, who nonetheless managed to prevent his enemy Quintus Sertorius from being elected. Two tribunes are known to have been on Sulla's side: Sextus Lucilius and Publius Magius, the latter being Italian.

The consular elections were held in the centuriate assembly after those of the tribunes and other lesser magistrates. Sulla's favourite candidate for the consulship, Publius Servilius Vatia, also lost, even though he had arranged a triumph for him on 21 October 88 in order to boost his popularity. The two new consuls were Gnaeus Octavius and Lucius Cornelius Cinna. It seems that both consuls were elected because they were not close to either Sulla or Marius and Sulpicius and favoured the status quo. The wealthy voters who dominated the centuriate assembly were against both Sulpicius' mass enrolment of new Italian citizens and Sulla's coup, even though his reforms benefited them. Ernst Badian writes that "at this time Sulla was the leader of a mercenary army of have-nots: a phenomenon unwelcome to those classes". Octavius was a man without military experience and, according to Cicero, not a good speaker. However, he was a harsh conservative from a family with distinguished records of resisting popular agitation—he personally fought Saturninus in his youth—which made his election possible in the political context of 88. Cinna's background is not well-known. Keaveney says he possibly made a campaign against Sulla, while Barry Katz tells that Cinna was at the time from a more conservative background, with ancestors and relatives hostile to the Gracchi. Before proclaiming the electoral results valid (a procedure known as renuntiatio), Sulla obtained the oath from his successors that they would uphold his legislation. This oath had perhaps been required by a law of Sulla, approved by the senate and voted by the centuriate assembly because it enshrined the political and social status quo.

== Aftermath ==
The situation quickly worsened for Sulla after the end of his consulship. In order to retain his control of the government once away to fight Mithridates, he made Pompeius Rufus proconsul in replacement of Pompeius Strabo, who had remained neutral during Sulla's march, but was still at the head of the other main army in Italy. Sulla's plan was therefore to remove this potentially dangerous rival and make Pompeius the guardian of his work. However, Pompeius Strabo ordered his soldiers to murder Pompeius Rufus when he arrived in his camp to take over his army. Meanwhile, the tribune of the plebs Marcus Vergilius sued Sulla, on the order of Cinna, probably for having killed Sulpicius. His goal was perhaps to convict Sulla and therefore strip him of his command, but the move was illegal as a magistrate holding imperium had immunity. Sulla ignored the prosecution and left to the East with his legions.

In Sulla's absence, Cinna relaunched Sulpicius' policy in favour of the Italians, which was opposed by the other consul, Octavius. After a riot, Cinna was expelled from Rome and stripped of his consulship. Cinna then followed Sulla's example; he gathered troops still present in Italy and, appealing to the men to vindicate his consular status, marched on Rome with the help of Marius, who had returned from Africa. In the subsequent confrontation, known as the Bellum Octavianum, the other consul Octavius could only rely on the troops of Pompeius Strabo, but the latter died in a plague, which enabled Cinna and Marius to capture the city. Like Sulla before, they murdered their opponents and declared Sulla hostis, while cancelling his laws. The situation remained in a standstill, with Cinna in control of Rome and Sulla in the East for three years, until Cinna died in 84. Sulla returned from Greece in 83; his experienced legions swept away the levies of Cinna's followers and he captured Rome a second time. Like in 88, he targeted his enemies in extrajudicial murders, but this time in a much wider proscription. He was then appointed dictator, so he could restore the constitutional program he had passed in 88.

Modern scholars severely judge Sulla's decision to march on Rome. They insist on the novelty of Sulla's march, which destroyed the previous aristocratic system of governance, and the dangerous precedent he set for strong and unscrupulous generals. Christopher Mackay writes that "at this point, Sulla took a step that would seal the fate of the Republic, even though it would continue to function (more or less) for another four decades". C. F. Konrad says that "For the res publica of the nobles, it signaled the beginning of the end", a view followed by Harriet Flower, "Sulla's decision to march on Rome with the army... was a devastating choice that led to the complete collapse of the traditional republican culture of the nobiles".

== Bibliography ==
- Annie Allély, "La déclaration d'hostis de 88 et les douze hostes", Revue des Études Anciennes, 2007, 109–1, pp. 175–206.
- Ernst Badian, Foreign Clientelae (264–70 B.C.), Oxford, Clarendon Press, 1958.
- ——, Studies in Greek and Roman History, Oxford, Blackwell, 1964.
- ——, Lucius Sulla, the Deadly Reformer, Sidney, University of Sidney Press, 1970. ISBN 0-424-06090-6
- Edward Bispham, From Asculum to Actium, the Municipalization of Italy from the Social War to Augustus, Oxford University Press, 2007. ISBN 978-0-19-923184-3
- T. Robert S. Broughton, The Magistrates of the Roman Republic, American Philological Association, 1951–1952.
- ——, "Candidates Defeated in Roman Elections: Some Ancient Roman "Also-Rans"", Transactions of the American Philosophical Society, New Series, 1991, Vol. 81, No. 4, pp. i–vi+1–64.
- Pierre F. Cagniart, "L. Cornelius Sulla in the Nineties: a Reassessment", Latomus, T. 50, Fasc. 2, Apr–Jun 1991, pp. 285–303.
- T. F. Carney, "The Flight and Exile of Marius", Greece & Rome, Vol. 8, No. 2 (Oct., 1961), pp. 98–121.
- Michael Crawford, Roman Republican Coinage, Cambridge University Press, 1974. ISBN 9780521074926
- Harriet I. Flower, Roman Republics, Princeton University Press, 2010. ISBN 978-0-691-14043-8
- Emilio Gabba, Republican Rome, the Army and the Allies, Berkeley/Los Angeles, University of California Press, 1976 (translated by P. J. Cuff from the original Italian edition of 1973, entitled Esercito e società nella tarda Repubblica Romana). ISBN 0-520-03259-4
- Erich S. Gruen, Roman Politics and the Criminal Courts, 149–78 B.C., Cambridge, MA, Harvard University Press, 1978. ISBN 0-674-28420-8.
- François Hinard, Les proscriptions de la Rome républicaine, Rome, Ecole française de Rome, 1985. ISBN 2728300941
- —— (editor), Histoire romaine, Tome 1, Des origines à Auguste, Paris, Fayard, 2000.
- ——, Sullana Varia, Aux sources de la première guerre civile romaine, Paris, De Boccard, 2008.
- ——, Rome, la dernière république, Recueil d'articles de François Hinard, textes réunis et présentés par Estelle Bertrand, Ausonius, Pessac, 2011. ISBN 9782356130426
- Barry R. Katz, "The first fruits of Sulla's March", L'Antiquité Classique, T. 44, Fasc. 1 (1975), pp. 100–125.
- ——, "Studies on the period of Cinna and Sulla", L'Antiquité Classique, T. 45, Fasc. 2 (1976), pp. 497–549.
- ——, "The Siege of Rome in 87 B. C.", Classical Philology, Vol. 71, No. 4 (Oct., 1976), pp. 328–336.
- Arthur Keaveney, Sulla, the Last Republican, London/New York, Routledge, 2005 (first published in 1982). ISBN 0-415-33660-0
- C. F. Konrad, "From the Gracchi to the First Civil War (133–70)" in Nathan Rosenstein & Robert Morstein-Marx, A Companion to the Roman Republic, Oxford, Blackwell, 2006, pp. 167–189. ISBN 978-1444334135
- Patrick Kragelund, "Dreams, Religion and Politics in Republican Rome", Historia: Zeitschrift für Alte Geschichte, Bd. 50, H. 1 (1st Qtr., 2001), pp. 53–95.
- Barbara M. Levick, "Sulla's March on Rome in 88 B.C.", Historia: Zeitschrift für Alte Geschichte, Bd. 31, H. 4 (4th Qtr., 1982), pp. 503–508.
- T. J. Luce, "Marius and the Mithridatic Command", Historia: Zeitschrift für Alte Geschichte, Bd. 19, H. 2 (Apr., 1970), pp. 161–194.
- Christopher S. Mackay, Ancient Rome: A Military and Political History, Cambridge University Press, 2004. ISBN 9780521809184
- Robert Morstein-Marx, "Consular appeals to the army in 88 and 87: the locus of legitimacy in late-republican Rome", in Hans Beck et al. (editors), Consuls and Res Publica, Holding High Office in the Roman Republic, Cambridge University Press, 2011, pp. 259–278. ISBN 978-1-107-00154-1
- Lee E. Reams, "Censorinus, Sulla, and Marius", Rheinisches Museum für Philologie, Neue Folge, 136. Bd., H. 3/4 (1993), pp. 281–288.
- Federico Santangelo, Sulla, the Elites and the Empire, A Study of Roman Policies in Italy and the Greek East, Leiden/Boston, Brill, 2007. ISBN 9789004163867
- Maria Teresa Schettino, Giuseppe Zecchini (editors), L'età di Silla, Atti del convegno Istituto italiano per la storia antica Roma, 23–24 marzo 2017, Rome, L'Erma du Bretschneider, 2018. ISBN 978-88-913-1696-7
- Robin Seager, "Sulla", in J. A Crook, Andrew Lintott, Elizabeth Rawson, The Cambridge Ancient History, vol. IX, The Last Age of the Roman Republic, 146–43 B.C., Cambridge University Press, 1992, pp. 165–207. ISBN 0521256038
- W. Jeffrey Tatum, "88 BCE", in Valentina Arena & Jonathan Prag (editors), A Companion to the Political Culture of the Roman Republic, Chichester, Wiley, 2022, pp. 555–567. ISBN 9781119673712
- Bernhard Woytek, Arma et Nummi: Forschungen zur romischen Finanzgeschichte und Muenzpragung der Jahre 49 bis 42 v.Chr. (Denkschriften Der Phil.-hist. Klasse), Vienna, Verlag der Österreichischen Akademie der Wissenschaften, 2003. ISBN 978-3-7001-3159-5
- Emilio Zucchetti, "Performance, Legal Pronouncements, and Political Communication in the First Roman Civil War", Hermes, 150, 2022/1, pp. 54–81.
