= Battle of Nola (89 BC) =

Battle of the Social War, won by Sulla

- Part of Social War
Date	89 BC
Location	Nola, Italy
Result	Roman victory

Belligerents
Roman Republic	Italian rebels

Commanders and leaders
Sulla	Lucius Cluentius †

Casualties and losses
Unknown	About 23,000

The Battle of Nola was fought in 89 BC during the Social War (91–88 BC). The Roman Republic, led by Sulla, defeated a rebel force led by the Pompeiian general Lucius Cluentius.

== Background ==
Following the death of the consul Lucius Porcius Cato at the Battle of Fucine Lake, Sulla assumed consular authority and campaigned the against Italian rebels in Campania, eventually arriving at Pompeii and laying siege to the town. While Sulla's army was encamped near Pompeii, a rebel relief force led by Cluentius arrived.

== Battle ==
Cluentius's army set up camp close to Sulla, and the Romans immediately marched out against the Pompeiian army. While the Romans were initially repulsed by Cluentius's army, they were eventually able to overpower them once the Roman foragers returned to the camp.

After the battle was won, the Romans chased the rebels to Nola, killing around 3,000 rebels as they fled. Once the rebel army arrived at Nola, the inhabitants forced them to pass through a single gate, allowing the Roman army to catch up in pursuit. At Nola, an additional 20,000 rebels (including Cluentius) were killed, according to Appian.

The siege continued in some form until 80 BC.
