= Siege of Asculum (90–89 BC) =

Roman battle of the Social War

Battle of Asculum
- Part of Social War
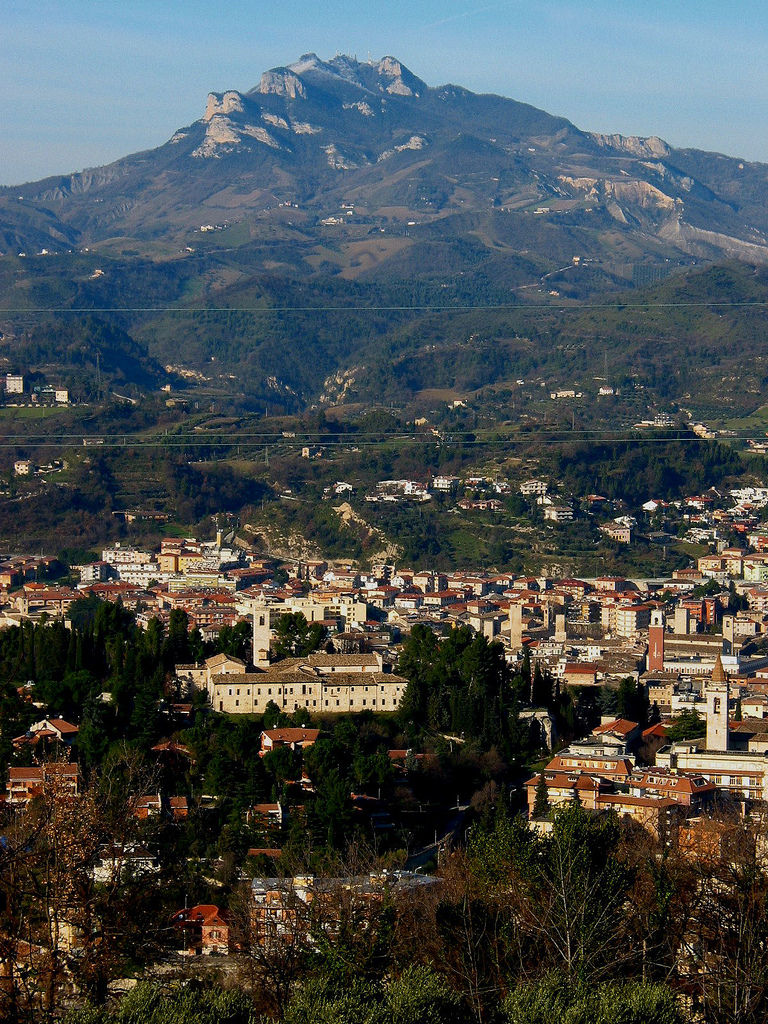
- Site of the siege in modern day
Date	89 BC
Location	Asculum, modern Ascoli Piceno, Italy 42.850000°N 13.583333°E
Result	Roman victory

Belligerents
Roman Republic	Italian rebels

Commanders and leaders
Pompeius Strabo; Sextus Julius Caesar †; Gaius Baebius	Gaius Judacilius

Strength
75,000	60,000

Casualties and losses
Unknown	Unknown
- Location within Italy Siege of Asculum (90–89 BC) (Europe)

The Battle of Asculum was fought in 89 BC during the Social War between Rome and its former Italian allies. The Romans were led by Gnaeus Pompeius Strabo, and were victorious over the rebels. Many scholars consider this battle to have been the turning point in the war.

== Siege of Asculum ==
In 90 BC, following their defeat at the Battle of Firmum and the death of their commander Lafrenius the remainder of the Italian rebel army fled to the city of Asculum, where they were quickly besieged by Pompeius Strabo. Gaius Judacilius, another Italian rebel leader and native of Asculum quickly came to the aid of his people with eight legions. He had sent a message on ahead to the inhabitants of Asculum with a command to attack the Roman army as soon as they saw him approaching to force the Romans into a battle with two fronts.

Although the people of Asculum refused his order, Judacilius managed to break through the Roman army and reach the town. Because of their refusal to fight, Judacilius accused his people of corwardice and lost all hope to save the town. He then put to death all the inhabitants who he considered his enemies, who he blamed for convincing the people to disobey his order. Preferring to die with honour and freedom, rather than surrendering to the enemy, Judacilius burned himself in the local temple.

The proconsul Sextus Julius Caesar attacked some 20,000 men of the rebel army while they were moving from one camp to another, killed about 8,000 of them, and captured the arms of many more. The siege of Asculum continued for a year, as he was dying of disease he named Gaius Baebius as commander in his place. The siege was finally ended in 89 BC with the Battle of Asculum, when Pompeius Strabo defeated an Italian relief army of 60,000 men.

== Aftermath ==
When the Roman Legions won the battle and entered the city, they destroyed all, burning houses and temples and killing the majority of the population. Their actions were meant to punish the city for its rebellion.

The future Consul Publius Ventidius was said to have been captured as a youth at this battle by Pompeius Strabo and displayed in a Triumph at Rome. He was educated like a Roman soldier and became a consul, fighting against the Parthian Empire and winning. He also met and became a trusted friend of Julius Caesar.
