= Siege of Nola =

Roman siege during the Social War and Sulla's civil war

- Part of the Social War and Sulla's civil war
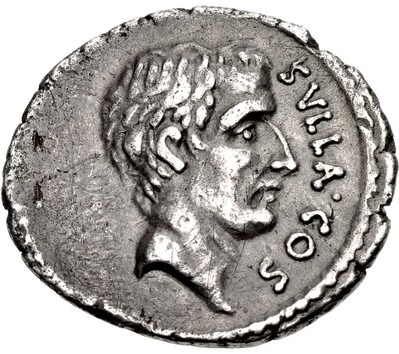
- The Roman commander Sulla
Date	c. 90–80 BC
Location	Nola, Campania
Result	Roman victory

Belligerents
Roman Republic	Samnites

Commanders and leaders
Sulla; Appius Claudius Pulcher	Gaius Papius Mutilus

Strength
Unknown	Unknown

Casualties and losses
Unknown	Unknown

The siege of Nola (c. 90–80 BC) refers to various Roman attempts to regain control of the city following its loss during the Social War.

== Background ==
Nola was captured by Samnite forces under Gaius Papius Mutilus in 90 BC. The captors were able to induce the defection of most of the 2000 Roman soldiers, with the officers refusing and starved to death.

== First Roman operations (89–87 BC) ==
In 89 BC, in the Battle of Nola, the Roman commander Sulla defeated an Italian force led by Lucius Cluentius. The survivors of the battle tried to flee into the city, although around 20,000, including Cluentius himself, failed and were killed outside the walls. The siege continued and in 88 BC Sulla used the besieging forces for his March on Rome.

== Final surrender (80 BC) ==
Major Roman commanders in the siege were Sulla and Appius Claudius Pulcher.

It was the last city to hold out against Rome with Rome not re-establishing control until 80 BC, after Sulla's civil war ended. It is possible that the city surrendered to avoid the consequences of a siege rather than being starved out by a siege.

== Aftermath ==
Following its surrender in 80 BC, Nola was restored to Roman control. According to Livy, 47 legions of Roman veterans were settled in the surrounding territory, reflecting Sulla’s wider program of land redistribution after the civil wars.

== Third Servile War ==
In the Third Servile War in 75 BC Nola was again besieged, this time by escaped slaves. It fell and was looted.

== Sources ==
- Dart, Christopher J. (2016) [First published by Ashgate, 2014]. The Social War, 91 to 88 BCE: a history of the Italian insurgency against the Roman republic. Routledge. ISBN 978-1-4724-1676-6.
- Holland, Tom (2003). Rubicon: The Last Years of the Roman Republic.
- Keaveney, Arthur (2005). Sulla: The Last Republican. Routledge.
- Rickard, J (23 November 2017). "Siege of Nola, 90-80 BC".
- Salmon, Edward Togo (1967). Samnium and the Samnites. Cambridge University Press.
- Smith, William (1850). "L. Cluentius". A Dictionary of Greek and Roman biography and mythology. Little, Brown and Co. p. 806. OCLC 68763679.
