= Judacilius =

Gaius Judacilius or Gaius Vidacilius was a native of Asculum in Picenum, and one of the chief generals of the allies in the Social War, 90 BC. He was known to have been one of the ablest and most resolute leaders of the insurrection. He first commanded in Apulia where he was very successful: Canusium and Venusia, with many other towns, opened their gates to him, and some which refused to obey him he took by force. He executed the Roman nobles who were made prisoners, and enrolled the common people and slaves among his troops.

Judacilius joined with Titus Afranius (also called Lafrenius) and Publius Ventidius Bassus at Mount Falerinus, where they defeated Pompeius Strabo, who retreated to Firmum, after which the three went their separate ways. When Strabo had in his turn gained a victory over Afranius and laid siege to Picenum, Judacilius, anxious to save his native town, hastened to the city with eight cohorts.

He sent word beforehand to the inhabitants that when they saw him advancing at a distance they should make a sally against Strabo's besieging force, so that the enemy should be attacked on both sides at once. The inhabitants were afraid to do so, and a massive and bloody battle ensued between the two forces; Roman reports of the battle speak of 75,000 soldiers on the Roman side against 60,000 Italians, although most scholars consider these numbers exaggerated.

Judacilius nevertheless cut his way through the enemy's lines and into the city. However his plan of seriously wounding the opposing force had failed. He had succeeded only in barricading his forces in with the defenders. Finding that the city could not possibly hold out much longer, and resolved not to survive its fall, he first put to death all his enemies, including those of Asculum he thought had discouraged the townsfolk from rallying to the fight, and then erected a funeral pyre within the precincts of the chief temple in the city. Judacilius then feasted with his friends, and, after taking poison, he laid himself down on the pile, and commanded his friends to set it on fire. The town shortly thereafter fell into the hands of Pompey and was severely punished for its resistance. The leaders of the insurrection were summarily executed, and the others were driven naked from the town.

Many scholars consider this battle to have been the turning point in the war.
