= Titus Vettius Scato =

1st century BCE Marsi rebel leader

Titus Vettius Scato (also Cato) was an Italian commander, general of the Marsi during the Social War. At the Battle of the Tolenus River (11 June 90 BC), Scato and the Marsi defeated the Roman consul, Publius Rutilius Lupus while the Romans were crossing the River Tolenus, routing them with heavy losses (8,000 Romans killed, including the Consul) . Unfortunately for Scato, Rutilius's senior legate, Gaius Marius, and his division were operating separately from Rutilius and crossed the river downstream of the battle, attacking the undefended Marsi. He defeated Lucius Julius Caesar in battle before marching on and capturing Aesernia. When he encountered an army under Pompey Strabo, instead of fighting, the two met, their armies treating each other without hatred. According to Seneca, he was captured by the Romans but was stabbed to death by his slave rather than face the ignominy of defeat.
