= Gaius Memmius (proquaestor) =

1st century Roman, brother-in-law of Pompey the Great

Gaius Memmius (died 75 BC) was a Roman politician and a soldier who served as quaestor in 76 BC. He was married to Pompeia, the sister of Pompey the Great.

== Biography ==
Gaius Memmius was the son of Lucius Memmius. Lucius was the brother of the Gaius Memmius who was plebeian tribune in 111 BC. Lucius had a son, this Gaius' brother, also called Lucius, who was plebeian tribune in 90. This Gaius married the sister of Pompey the Great, Pompeia. Their marriage produced a homonymous son who later became a moneyer and, in 54 BC, plebeian tribune.

This Memmius first appears as a moneyer in 87 BC. He then served Pompey during his Sicilian command in 81 BC at the end of Sulla's civil war. When Pompey sailed to Africa, to fight his enemies under Gnaeus Domitius Ahenobarbus, he put Memmius in command on Sicily.

During the Sertorian War, Memmius first served the proconsul Quintus Caecilius Metellus Pius, who was given the command against the Roman rebel Quintus Sertorius in Hispania. He probably went with Metellus' army when Metellus marched to Iberia in 79 BC. When Pompey was sent to support Metellus against Sertorius in 76 BC, Memmius was transferred to Pompey's army. He may have been military tribune from 79 to 77 BC, and then served Pompey as quaestor starting from 77 or 76 BC. Pompey sent Memmius, accompanied by the Spaniard Balbus, with a fleet to try and take New Carthage, secure it as a base, and from there move up the coast. Memmius and his force were immediately blockaded in the city, probably by Sertorius's pirate allies, and was unable to play his part in the campaign. Prorogued into 75 BC, at the Battle of Saguntum, he was killed during the early stages of the battle when Sertorius launched an attack at Pompey's command; Pompey survived the attack but Memmius died defending his brother-in-law. Plutarch called him "the most capable of Pompey's lieutenants".

== Bibliography ==
- Broughton, Thomas Robert Shannon (1952). The magistrates of the Roman republic. Vol. 2. New York: American Philological Association.
- Harlan, Michael (1995). Roman Republican Moneyers and Their Coins, 63 B.C.–49 B.C. University of Michigan: Seaby. ISBN 978-0-7134-7672-9.
- Leach, John (1978). Pompey the Great. Croom Helm. ISBN 0-8476-6035-4. LCCN 85031371.
- Matyszak, Philip (2013). Sertorius and the Struggle for Spain. Pen and Sword.
- Pina Polo, Francisco; Díaz Fernández, Alejandro (23 September 2019). The Quaestorship in the Roman Republic. KLIO / Beihefte. Neue Folge. De Gruyter. doi:10.1515/9783110666410. ISBN 978-3-11-066641-0. S2CID 203212723.
- Zmeskal, Klaus (2009). Adfinitas (in German). Vol. 1. Passau: Verlag Karl Stutz. ISBN 978-3-88849-304-1.
