= Battle of the Tolenus River =

- Part of Social War
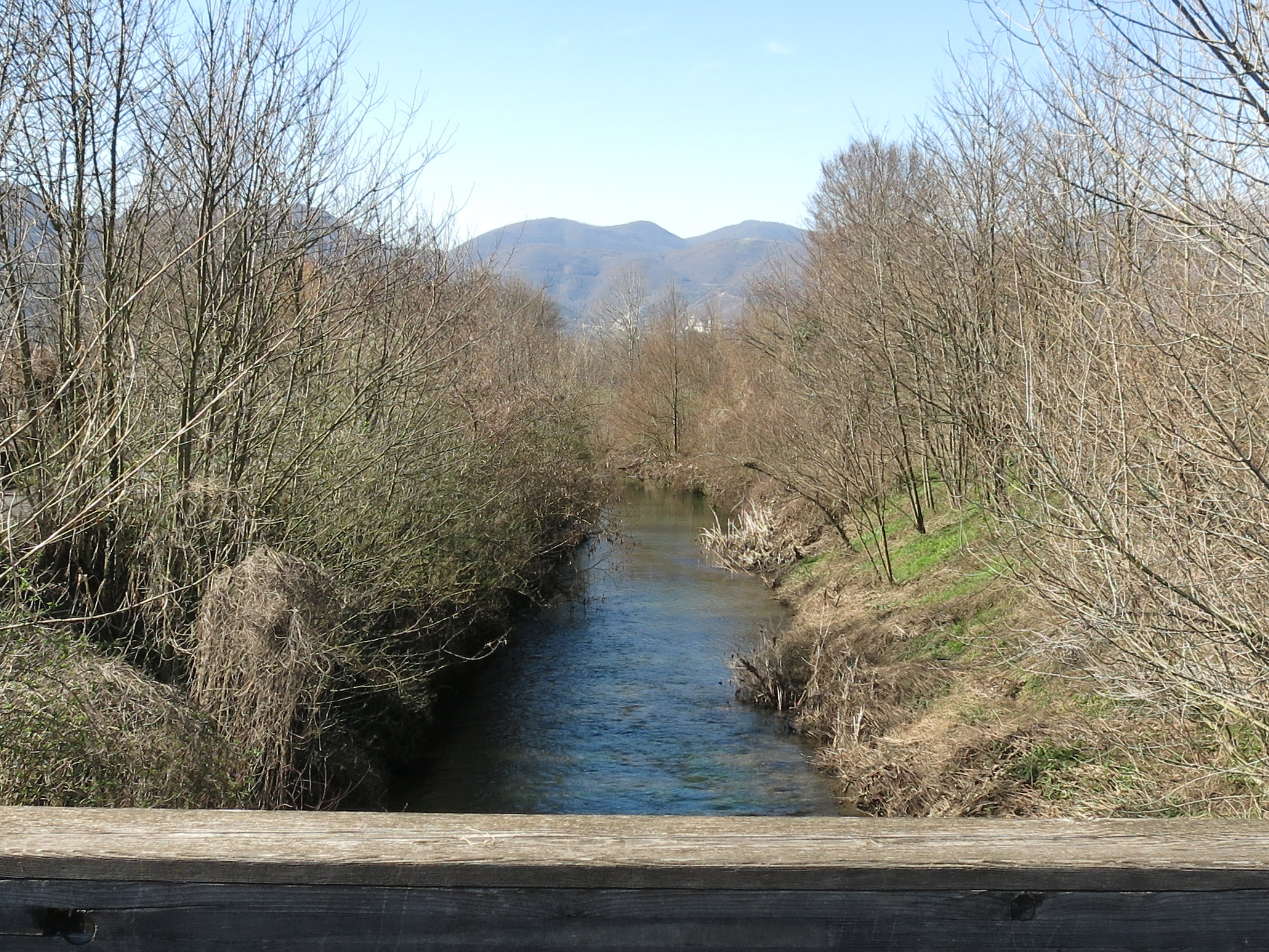
- View of the Turano River in near Rieti, Italy
Date	11 June 90 BC
Location	Turano River, Italy
Result	Rebel victory

Belligerents
Roman Republic	Italian rebels

Commanders and leaders
Publius Rutilius Lupus †; Gaius Marius	Titus Vettius Scato

Casualties and losses
About 8,000 killed	About 8,000 killed

The Battle of the Tolenus River was fought on 11 June 90 BC (Note: The battle coincided with the Matralia, the feast of the indigenous Latin goddess Mater Matuta on 11 June) between the Roman Republic, led by the consul Publius Rutilius Lupus, and an army of Marsian Rebels commanded by Titus Vettius Scato. The battle was part of the Social War and resulted in a major defeat for the Romans.

== Background ==
Publius Rutilius Lupus and Lucius Julius Caesar were elected as consuls for the year 90 BC and dispatched to command armies in the Social War, which had begun during the prior year with the rebellion of Asculum. While Lucius Caesar marched against the Samnites, Rutilius was sent to face the Marsi, selecting Gaius Marius as his senior legate.

== Battle ==
Rutilius and Marius constructed two bridges across the Tolenus River (Note: Known today as the Turano River) in eastern Latium, pitching camps on one side of the river, while the Marsian commander Titus Vettius Scato set up camp on the other side of the river, nearer to Marius's camp. The night before the battle, Scato sent an ambush force to the location of Rutilius's bridge, and when Rutilius attempted to cross with his army in the morning, they were attacked, and Rutilius was killed.

Marius, downstream from the attack, observed bodies floating down the river and therefore decided to advance across the river, taking Scato's undermanned camp by surprise and forcing Scato to retreat with his ambush force in search of provisions.

== Aftermath ==
The Battle of the Tolenus River was the largest engagement of the Social War thus far, with around 8,000 killed on both sides. Despite the equal losses, the battle was unquestionably a Roman defeat with the death of the consul Rutilius. The senate decided against holding elections to replace Rutilius, instead handing control of his army jointly to Marius and Quintus Servilius Caepio.
