= Lucius Cluentius =

Lucius Cluentius was a general of the Pompeiian forces. Lucius Cluentius, called Aulus Cluentius by Eutropius, was one of the Italian generals during the Social War. He commanded the Pompeiian troops against Sulla, and was at first victorious, but was subsequently defeated by Sulla in 89 BC. He, along with 20,000 of his men were killed after being chased to the walls of Nola, having been refused entry by its besieged inhabitants.

== Sources ==
- Smith, William (1850). "L. Cluentius". A Dictionary of Greek and Roman biography and mythology. Little, Brown and Co. p. 806. OCLC 68763679.
