= Pompeia (wife of Memmius) =

Ancient Roman noblewoman

Pompeia (born late 2nd century BC and died some time 1st century BC) was a Roman noblewoman of plebeian status.

== Biography ==
=== Early life ===
She was born and raised in a senatorial family in Rome. Her father was the consul and general Gnaeus Pompeius Strabo but the name of her mother is uncertain, some sources claim she was a Lucilia but others that Lucilia was her grandmother. Pompeia's brother was the future triumvir Gnaeus Pompeius Magnus (better known as Pompey the Great) who was relatively close in age to her. They also probably had another sister who was somewhat older.

=== Marriages ===
Pompeia married the Roman nobleman and politician Gaius Memmius. They likely had a son by the same name who became a moneyer. Memmius was an ally to her brother; he commanded forces under Pompey in Sicily in 81 BC; he served Pompey as a quaestor from 76 to 75 BC during the Sertorian War on the Iberian Peninsula. In 75 BC Memmius was killed in a battle near Saguntum. After Memmius's death she married Publius Cornelius Sulla, the nephew of the late Dictator Sulla.

== Sources ==
- Microsoft Encarta Encyclopedia 2002
