= Gaia Afrania =

1st-century BC Roman woman

Gaia Afrania (d. 48 BCE) was an ancient Roman woman who represented either herself or others in legal courts. Her name is rendered as C. Afrania in the works of the 1st-century CE historian Valerius Maximus, though it is alternatively rendered as Carfania in the works of the 3rd-century Roman jurist Ulpian. She is also perhaps referred to as Carfinia in the works of the 2nd-century poet Juvenal. According to Ulpian, she "immodestly" ("inverecunde") spoke in court on behalf of others and, in doing so, pestered a magistrate, leading to a law being passed barring women from representing others during trials. Her story is also recounted by Valerius Maximus, she personally brought cases before a praetor, supposedly not due to a lack of a more socially acceptable advocate, but because she "abounded in impudence" ("impudentia abundabat"). In Valerius Maximus's version of the story, she spoke on behalf of herself, which contradicts the statement by Ulpian that she represented others. Valerius Maximus writes that she became a "notorious example of female litigiousness" ("muliebris calumniae notissimum exemplum"), and—during his lifetime—the name Carfania was utilized as insult for "women of improper habits" ("improbis feminarum moribus"). She supposedly lived until the second consulship of Julius Caesar, meaning the year 48 BCE. In the account of Valerius, she is framed in animalistic terms; her speech is described as like "barking" ("latratibus") and he even describes her as a "monster" ("monstrum"), a term elsewhere defined by Roman legal scholars as referring to an abnormally-shaped baby whose physique resembles an animal more so than a human. Valerius Maximus describes the story of Carfania immediately after recounting the life of another woman, named Maesia, who also supposedly argued her own case in front of a judge. Maesia is, however, not portrayed in a negative light, unlike Carfania. It is not clear exactly why Valerius Maximus favored Maesia, though it is perhaps due to the different motivations for their appearance in court: Maesia may have done so out of necessity, whereas Carfania did so willingly, in spite of her purported options for a different advocate. Ultimately, however, the justification for Maximus's reasoning will remain unknown. Valerius Maximus records that she was the wife of a senator named Licinius Bucco.

== See also ==
- Afrania gens
