= Titus Afranius =

1st-century BC Italian general

Titus Afranius, Afrenius, or Lafrenius, who was not a Roman, was one of the leaders of the Italian confederates in the Social War in 90 BC. At Mount Falerinus he united with Judacilius and Publius Ventidius Bassus and defeated the legate Pompeius Strabo, and pursued him into Firmum, after which the three went their separate ways. Afranius besieged Strabo within the walls of the city. Strabo, on hearing another army was approaching, sent out Publius Sulpicius Rufus to attack Afranius' force from behind while he mounted a frontal assault. The battle proceeded evenly until Sulpicius managed to set fire to Afranius' encampment. Afterwards Afranius' forces fled to Asculum without a leader, as he had fallen at some time during the battle.
