= Publius Rutilius Lupus (consul) =

- Died: 90 BC; Tolenus River, Latium
- Cause of death: Killed in action
- Occupations: General and politician
- Office: Consul (90 BC)

Publius Rutilius Lupus (died 90 BC) was a consul of the Roman Republic in 90 BC. He led a campaign against the Marsi during the Social War, ultimately resulting in his death at the unsuccessful Battle of the Tolenus River.

== Career ==
Publius Rutilius Lupus was elected to serve as consul alongside Lucius Julius Caesar in 90 BC. The Social War broke out a year prior, and the two consuls were dispatched. Lucius Caesar was sent out to face the Samnites, while Lupus was to fight the Marsi. He chose Gaius Marius (who was a relative of his) as his senior legate. Marius advised him to train his inexperienced troops more before meeting the enemy in battle, but Rutilius ignored this advice.

Rutilius advanced and divided his troops between himself and Marius in order to build two bridges to cross the river Tolenus. The Marsic commander, Titus Vettius Scato, was encamped on the other side. He placed a thin screen of troops near the bridge of Marius and with his main body he lay in wait near Lupus's bridge. The following morning, Lupus fell into the trap and lost most of his army, some 8,000 men; he himself received a fatal wound to the head. Marius noticed bodies floating down the river and so crossed and captured the poorly defended enemy camp. The battle was fought on the feast of Matralia: 11 June 90 BC.

== Sources ==
- Appian, Civil Wars, 43.
- Livy, Epitomes, 73.

Political offices
Preceded by L. Marcius Philippus; Sex. Julius Caesar	Consul of Rome; 90 BC; With: Lucius Julius Caesar	Succeeded by Pompeius Strabo; Lucius Porcius Cato
