= Battle of Firmum =

- Part of Social War (91-88 BC)
Date	90 BC
Location	Città di Fermo 43°09′39″N 13°42′57″E
Result	Roman Victory

Commanders and leaders
Gnaeus Pompeius Strabo; Publius Sulpicius Rufus	Lafrenius †

Casualties and losses
	Unknown

The Battle of Firmum was fought between a Roman force under Gnaeus Pompeius Strabo and a rebel force led by Lafrenius. It took place during the Social War in 90 BC and was a Roman victory.

Having been defeated by a much larger rebel force at Mount Falernus and then besieged, Strabo was in a precarious situation. When he heard more rebels were approaching he launched two sallies. One was to attack the rebels head on while the other, led by Sulpicius, attacked their rear. Despite successfully pulling off the manoeuvre the battle didn't turn in the Romans favour, the result remaining up in the air until some Romans managed to set fire to the rebel camp. Seeing their camp burning the rebels lost heart and fled in disorder. During the battle the rebel commander, Lafrenius, was killed. The remainder of the rebel army fled to Asculum, where Strabo would besiege the city for two years.
