= Battle of Mount Falernus =

Battle during the Social War

The Battle of Mount Falernus was a battle during the early stages of the Social War. It was a victory for the Italian rebels causing the Roman army under Pompey Strabo to retreat. The rebels pursued them and besieged them at Firmum. Some have argued that the different accounts of the battle are instead two separate Roman defeats.
