= Publius Afranius Potitus =

1st-century BC Roman plebeian

Publius Afranius Potitus was a Roman plebeian who, during an illness of Emperor Caligula, vowed to sacrifice his own life if the emperor recovered, expecting, instead, to be rewarded for apparent devotion. However, when Caligula recovered and Afranius was unwilling to fulfill his vow, the emperor had him dressed as a sacrificial victim, paraded through the streets, and then hurled down from the eminence (Latin: ex aggere) near the Colline gate.
