= Arthur Keaveney =

Irish historian (1951–2020)

- Born: 8 July 1951; Galway, Ireland
- Died: 23 June 2020 (aged 68); Ireland

Arthur Peter Keaveney (8 July 1951 – 23 June 2020) was an Irish historian.

== Biography ==
Keaveney was born in Galway and was educated there (St Joseph's Patrician College and University College Galway). In 1975 he moved to Hull University to work on PhD on Lucius Cornelius Sulla, which was later expanded and published as a book.

Keaveney was a Doctoral fellow at University of Wales, Aberystwyth, from 1978 to 1979. From 1979 to 2014, he was a lecturer and reader in ancient history at the University of Kent, specialising in Republican Rome and Achaemenid Persia. According to Herbert Heftner, his second edition of a biography of Sulla, published in 2005, is one of the works "to which we owe significant advances in knowledge of Roman history around the turn of the 2nd to the 1st century BC." His Lucullus biography has been translated into Polish.

In 2013, Keaveney was an honorary president of the Classical Association of Ireland. He remained an emeritus reader at the University of Kent after retirement and continued his research, which included Achaemenid Persia and the miracles of Thomas Becket as depicted in the Canterbury Cathedral windows. He was working on a monograph on the Persian court at the time of his death.

Keaveney died from COVID-19 during the COVID-19 pandemic in England, on 23 June 2020.

== Selected bibliography ==
- Sulla. The Last Republican. London 1982.
- Rome and Unification of Italy. London 1987.
- Lucullus. A Life. London 1992.
- The life and journey of Athenian statesman Themistocles (524-460-B.C.?) as a refugee in Persia. Lewiston, 2003.
- The army in the Roman revolution. London 2007.
- (with Madden, J.) Sir William Herbert Ad Campianum Iesuitam Eiusque Rationes Decem Responsio. Georg Olms Verlag, 2009.
- The Persian Invasions of Greece. Barnsley, 2011.
