= Social War (91–87 BC) =

War between Rome and its Italian allies

- Part of the crisis of the Roman Republic
- Roman territory in red. Initial insurgent territories in dark green, with later insurgents' territories in light green
Date	91–87 BC
Location	Roman Italy
Result	Roman victory

Belligerents
Roman Republic; Italian allies	Italian rebels Marsic group: Marsi; Paeligni; Vestini; Marrucini; Picentes; Frentani; Samnite group: Samnites; Campanians; Iapygians; Lucanians; Hirpini; Venusia

Commanders and leaders
Lucius Julius Caesar; Publius Rutilius Lupus †; Gnaeus Pompeius Strabo; Lucius Porcius Cato †; Sextus Julius Caesar †; Gaius Marius; Lucius Cornelius Sulla	Quintus Poppaedius Silo †; Gaius Papius Mutilus; Titus Vettius Scato †; Judacilius †; Titus Afranius †

Strength
175,000 men	130,000 men

Casualties and losses
50,000 killed	50,000 killed
- c. 100,000 killed in total

The Social War (from Latin bellum sociale, "war of the allies"), also known as the Italian War or the Marsic War, was fought between the Roman Republic and several of its autonomous allies (socii), largely from 91 to 88 BC in Italy, with some holdouts persisting until 87 BC.

The war started in late 91 BC with the rebellion of Asculum. Other Italian towns also rebelled and the Roman response was initially confused. By the new year, the Romans had levied armies to oppose the rebels but found initial headway difficult. By the end of the year they were able to cut the Italian rebels into two, isolating them into northern and southern sectors. The Italian rebels attempted to invade Etruria and Umbria at the start of 89 BC but were defeated. In the south, they were defeated by Lucius Cornelius Sulla, who for his victories would win a consulship the next year. The Romans retained the initiative, and by 88 BC the conflict was largely over, and Roman attention had been captured by the ongoing First Mithridatic War. The few Italian rebels on the field by 87 BC eventually reached a negotiated settlement during a short civil war that year. At various stages of the war, Romans brought legislation allowing Italian towns to elect Roman citizenship if they had not revolted or would otherwise put down arms, draining support from the rebels.

Views differ as to the causes of the war, primarily on whether Roman citizenship was already a coveted status and whether the extension of such citizenship was the main goal of the socii. The main ancient source for the period is the relatively late Appian, who wrote in the imperial period during the 2nd century AD, and whose narrative is largely one based on demands of the allies for Roman citizenship. Other historians, most especially Henrik Mouritsen, have focused instead on a perceived alternative tradition, which has the Italian allies rebelling against Roman hegemony and encroachment on allied lands.

The massive expansion of the citizenship that followed the Social War remained a politically-charged topic, especially in terms of how they would be allocated into the tribes that were the traditional units of Roman democratic processes. Disputes over enfranchisement played a role in Sulla's march on Rome in 88 BC to depose the plebeian tribune Publius Sulpicius Rufus. Fears of Sulla rolling back hard-won Italian rights contributed to resistance during Sulla's civil war. The conflict also blurred the distinction between Romans and their enemies; the presence of large armies in Italy during the war also provided opportunities for generals to seize power extralegally. For these reasons and others, some historians believe the conflict played an important role in setting up the collapse of the republic.

== Name ==
The name Social war is an improper English translation of bellum sociale, which means "war of the allies" (from Latin socius, meaning "ally"). Today, the name is used more generally in classics scholarship to refer to any war between allies. The name bellum sociale was first used in the second century AD by the historian Florus, and only became common during the imperial period. The Romans of the time called it the Marsic war named for the Marsi, an Italian tribe located east of Rome who, during the war, killed two Roman consuls, or otherwise called it the Italian war. The focus on the Marsi may also have to do with Quintus Poppaedius Silo, who was one of the Italian leaders.

Usage in the late republican and early imperial period treated the names Marsic and Italian war as largely interchangeable. Cicero's works refer to it as bellum Marsicum or bellum Italicum (though he also uses bella cum sociis); Sallust, according to Aulus Gellius, calls it the Marsic war; Velleius Paterculus, Asconius Pedianus, and Julius Obsequens call it the bellum Italicum. An official senatus consultum dated to 22 May 78 BC calls it bellum Italicum and the Augustan-era fasti consulares call it bellum Marsicum.

== Background ==
=== Italy in the second century BC ===
The Italian peninsula during the second century BC was dominated by the Roman Republic, which was allied in a collection of bilateral treaties with the many city-states on the peninsula. In general, those cities received guarantees of territorial integrity and internal self-government in exchange for supporting Rome with men during its many wars. Allied contingents made up an increasing portion of Roman manpower: by 295 BC, the allied contingents of Roman-led armies as a whole outnumbered the Romans on the field and, by 218 BC, there were three allies on the field for every two Romans. This made allied manpower indispensable for Roman military superiority.

Cities cooperated with Rome for various reasons. They received shares of the war spoils and land assignments. Rome also supported allied elites against popular revolts (eg at Arretium, Lucania, and Volsinii in 302, 296, and 264 BC, respectively). While some of the cities defected during the Second Punic War after the Battle of Cannae in 216 BC, the defectors were defeated and harsh terms applied. Over time, the Romans started to interfere in the internal affairs of their allies, though historians differ as to its extent. For example, when the senate acted to suppress the Bacchanalia in 186 BC, historians differ as to whether this applied only to Roman land or was extended extraterritorially to the allies.

By the time of the Social War, the allies were mainly located in the following regions: two northern ones (Etruria and Umbria) and more further south (Lucania, Apulia, and Magna Graecia). As far back as the fifth century, the Oscan and Umbrian-speaking communities in southern Italy had formed a flexible confederal league; the most powerful of these were the Samnites and Lucanians. The Romans had fought with the Samnites in a number of wars during the conquest of Italy; even afterwards, these allies retained their cohesiveness, having defected from Rome as a single bloc during the Second Punic war. Romanisation through to the second century proceeded with considerable heterogeneity: in Apulia and Samnium, Latin influence was largely absent in both the archaeological and literary sources, while in Marsic lands, inscriptions indicate adoption of the Latin alphabet. On the whole, Italian tribes and peoples on the eve of the Social war still held themselves distinct from Rome, just as they had in previous centuries.

Also importantly, before the 1st century AD, it was not possible for a person to hold more than one citizenship. Nor, before the empire, were allied soldiers granted Roman citizenship at the close of their service. For example, Cicero deliberately contrasts Italic single citizenship against Greek multiple citizenship in his speech for Lucius Cornelius Balbus, a provincial who had been granted citizenship by Pompey. Citizenship was linked to territories: a person who received Roman citizenship gave up their local citizenship; losing local citizenship and living outside of Roman territory meant a local reduction in socio-economic status.

=== Italian demands ===
The "Italian question" refers to the relationship between Rome and her Italian allies. It is still not entirely clear what the Italian allies were fighting for. There are two threads in the ancient accounts: one depicting the struggle as one for Roman citizenship and another as one against Roman domination.

Edward Bispham, writing in the 2016 Companion to Roman Italy, concludes that "it seems certain that the Social War is best understood as a revolt from Rome" but synthesises the approaches in that the desires for citizenship and independence are themselves expressions of an underlying desire for equality and freedom, inside or outside the Roman political system.

==== Desire for citizenship ====
Appian's Civil Wars is the main source for much of this period. It provides three themes for the Italians: support for agrarian reform, votes for land, and demands for political equality. According to Appian, the agrarian reforms of Tiberius Gracchus were meant to support the Italians. However, there is no good evidence to verify this claim and most historians reject it as a political tactic either to distinguish between free and slave or as an anachronism interjected by his brother Gaius to legitimate Gaius' reform agenda some ten years later. Attempts to actually grant citizenship started in 125 BC with a proposal by Marcus Fulvius Flaccus. Gaius Gracchus is said to have brought similar proposals. These attempts were largely brought because Roman tribunes and magistrates believed that granting citizenship could be traded for Italian elites acquiescing over occupied public lands.

Appian similarly frames the war as a reaction to the failed reform proposals of the plebeian tribune of 91 BC, Marcus Livius Drusus. As part of a complex scheme to change criminal court jury composition, Drusus allegedly would have to seduce the people with free land, which required public lands, which required pushing Italians off that land, which required a sweetener of citizenship to quell objections. When the proposals failed, the Italians went to war to secure the citizenship and legal equality denied to them in peace.

The most convincing theme that Appian presents, however, is an Italian desire for political equality: he says the Italians aspired to be "partners in rule rather than subjects". However, it is likely that poor and rich Italians sought different goals: poorer Italians were likely seeking freedom from unfair treatment by Roman magistrates; it would have been their richer compatriots that would benefit from direct access to Roman politics.

More modern versions of the citizenship thesis have been advanced by Emilio Gabba, arguing that Italian commercial classes (the publicani) drove romanisation in an attempt to share in the rewards of empire. The exalted position of Italian businessmen in the provinces may have absolved their status inferiority at home; combined with a desire to influence Roman provincial policy, they may have sought to secure their business rights by becoming Roman citizens. This thesis, however, is not widely accepted since the Italians who were most exposed to the Greek East were not those who led the revolt and had to be coerced into joining it. Similarly, A N Sherwin-White believed that the Italians wanted Roman citizenship to secure legal equality. Less convincingly, D B Nagle argued that economic factors could explain the start of the war.

==== Rebellion ====
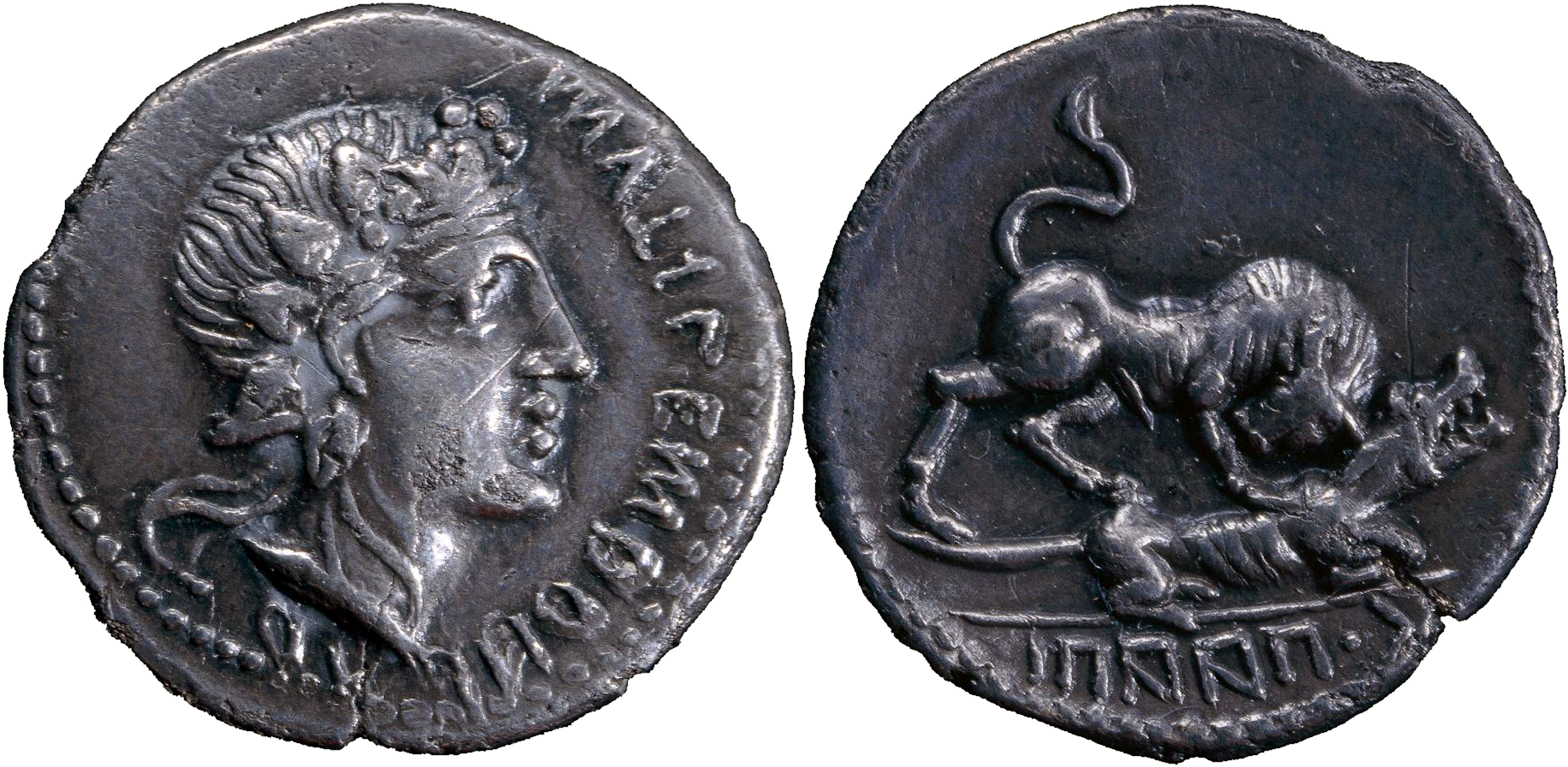
Denarius of Gaius Papius Mutilus, one of the Italian generals during the war, depicting an Italian bull goring the Roman wolf.

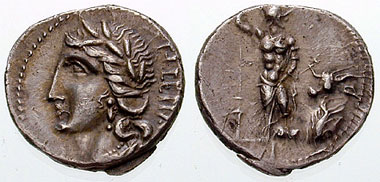
Italian coin depicting a soldier standing next to an Italian bull and on top of a Roman standard.

Henrik Mouritsen, in the influential 1998 book Italian Unification, argues that Appian's citizenship narrative is highly anachronistic. For writers in the imperial period, Roman citizenship was highly desirable. Those writers then retrojected that desirability onto the Italians who lived centuries before their time. His analysis of the evidence also concludes that before the Social War, there was little agitation for citizenship, multiple citizenships still being invalid, which would have been incompatible with local autonomy. As to the possibility of votes for land, he writes "Flaccus' citizenship bill [and bills similar to it] would have been infinitely more far-reaching in its implications than the reform promoted... it would lead to a total upheaval of the traditional alliance system on which Roman domination in Italy had been based for centuries... as an attempt to restart the land distribution process the bill would probably have been of scant value". The extent of the upheaval of the alliance system similarly leads Mouritsen to reject granting citizenship as part of Drusus' attempt to change jury composition as means far in excess of the ends sought.

Instead, Mouritsen focuses on Italian discontent with Roman public land reform. Rome's public lands had been won centuries prior to the 90s BC when the republic had subjugated the Italian peninsula. Newer lands had also been forcibly taken from southern Italian cities that had sided with Hannibal during the Second Punic War. With each victory, the Romans demanded and received from the Italians a latent title to lands the Italians still occupied. For centuries, Roman claims on those lands were unenforced. After the start of the land reform process in 133 BC with Tiberius Gracchus's lex Sempronia, Italians started to complain about Roman magistrates illegally encroaching on their land holdings; in 129 BC, the senate acted and deprived the land redistribution commission of its survey jurisdiction, putting a pause on land distributions. The commission, before the pause in 129 BC, likely quickly surveyed and parceled out the unoccupied and recently surveyed Hannibalic war-era lands. The older holdings elsewhere, however, were impossible to disentangle from private lands. Never surveyed and with unclear borders, Italians objected to the land commission's infringements on their property, which was guaranteed by treaty. The objections brought the redistributive process quickly to a halt.

Mouritsen proposed instead the following reconstruction for the start of the war in the late 90s BC. Drusus, seeking to placate the plebs in exchange for a change in the jury courts, proposed a law to do more widespread land distributions against the allies' protests. Their anger increased when the law passed over their objections and Rome started seizing allied lands; the allies therefore started preparations for an insurrection by late summer 91 BC. Amid this distrust, Drusus was blamed for breaking down relations with the allies, which led to a confrontation between Drusus and the consul, Lucius Marcius Philippus, in the senate some time in September. Rome responded to these rumours of Italian unrest by sending garrison forces into Italy, which explains their capture at the start of the war. Drusus may have then attempted to rescue his standing and placate the allies by trying to pass a law to give the allies citizenship. After this attempt failed amid Drusus' declining popularity, the attempts of the Latins – who actually were agitating for citizenship – to assassinate the consuls, who opposed Latin citizenship, at the Latin Festival became known. With the prospect of the Latins deserting Rome, the balance of military power would shift into the Italians' favour. After secret negotiations, the Italians then launched their bid to throw off Roman hegemony.

== Outbreak ==
=== Preparations ===
As evidenced by the destruction of Fregellae after an attempted revolt in 125 BC, it was an enormous risk to rebel against Rome. The Italians, in planning their war, would have to form reliable alliances secured with hostages. Appian describes a long series of secret negotiations between the Italian states, of which Rome was ignorant.

The Romans were likely aware of some kind of unrest, even if they did not know of its scope. This is evidenced by Roman garrisons being captured at the start of the war in unfriendly cities. It is likely those garrisons had been dispatched before the start of the war to strategically important locations. Already by late 91 BC, the Romans had sent praetors with levied troops around the peninsula to investigate rumours of a plot. But, by the time the investigations had been completed (or as a result of those investigations), the war had started. Regardless, preparations for a revolt were likely brewing before Drusus' tribunate in 91 BC.

=== Military command ===
At the outbreak of the war, the Italians levied forces and formed up armies to oppose the Romans. To have done this so quickly, agreements must have been reached on power-sharing and command before the outbreak of the war.

According to Photius' summary of Diodorus Siculus, which is accepted by most modern scholars, the Italians established a new capital at Corfinium with a forum and a five-hundred-man senate. The senate then appointed two consuls and twelve praetors, dividing them evenly between northern and southern fronts (with the Italian consuls Quintus Poppaedius Silo and Gaius Papius Mutilus assigned to the north and south, respectively). Reconstructions have differed over the Italian state's organisation. In 1854, Theodor Mommsen proposed that the Italians self-organised basically along the same lines as the Romans. In 1924, Alfred von Domaszewski suggested that Silo and Mutilus were merely leaders of two major factions in the Italian forces and that the twelve "praetors" reflected twelve tribal divisions arranged in a federal structure; this position was accepted in the first edition of the Cambridge Ancient History in 1932. Later reconstructions have interjected popular elements à la the Roman comitia centuriata. But others, such as Mouritsen, have taken a more critical eye at the evidence and viewed the Italian magistrates and senate as a more formally federal structure without direct popular involvement.

Mouritsen reads from Livy's description of the Latin War (when Rome's Latin allies rebelled c. 340 BC) possible hints for the lost portions of Livy's narrative on the Social War. Because much of Livy's work on early history has long been recognised to be anachronistic, Mouritsen believes that the narrative on the Latin War may anachronistically reflect Social War-era realities. In the Livian Latin War, the Latin allies demanded a real power-sharing arrangement where magistracies and senatorial seats were to be set aside for the Latins in proportion to military contributions. If the Italians had similar aims in 91 BC, they would have been incompatible with a centralised Roman state and the supremacy of Rome's urban elite.

However, beyond Diodorus' summarised description of the Italian government, there are few other sources which describe the Italian coalition's internal politics or offices. Instead, they refer to various tribal and ethnic leaders without distinction of office. Florus, for example, mentions no Italian senate or magistrates, but instead says that the Italians served each under their own standards. Coinage, along with Livy, seem to refer to a number of imperatores (Oscan sing. embratur), which may have been appointed by each ethnic group. They did not seem to have been replaced after death in battle, implying the lack of any Italian elections. Christopher Dart suggests that the Italians converted the victory title imperator into an official magisterial title, in the same way imperator later turned into the title of the Roman emperor in the Flavian era.

=== Inciting incident ===
In late 91 or early 90 BC, a rumour was heard that Asculum was exchanging hostages with another city. Such an exchange was customary in the preparations for war to prevent allied cities from defecting. A Roman praetor by the name of Quintus Servilius, possibly the quaestor of 103 BC, rushed to the city and threatened violence if Asculum did not desist. The inhabitants, however, fearful of Roman discovery, responded by killing the praetor and his legate Fonteius. They then killed all the Romans in the city and ransacked their goods. Violence having been committed against the Romans openly, the Italians revolted as one.

This sequence is at odds with Appian's account, which paints Asculum as rioting in late 91 BC in response to Marcus Livius Drusus' assassination in Rome and Roman prosecution of Italian allies. In this narrative, Drusus, whose political star was waning since the death of his influential supporter Lucius Licinius Crassus, had his legislation invalidated by the senate. He was shortly thereafter killed by an unknown assassin. Around this time, the Italians send a delegation to Rome but the Romans refuse to negotiate. Appian asserts that after Drusus' death but before the start of the war, the equites set up the quaestio Varia (the Varian court) to prosecute those who aided the Italians in securing citizenship. After the double blow of Drusus' death and the prosecution of their allies at Rome, Appian then has the Italians form their conspiracy and revolt. However, as the Italians could not have had enough time between Drusus' death and the start of the war to organise, Appian's timing cannot be correct.

== Course ==
While the inciting incident of the war is clear, its end is not. One could argue various dates, ranging from 89 BC, when most of the fighting was practically complete, down to November 82 BC and the Battle of the Colline Gate when an identifiably Italian group of rebels was at last defeated. This article presents events down to the nominal pacification of the Samnites and Lucanians in 87 BC.

The main sources for the course of the war are relatively confused. Appian's account present events roughly geographically, producing a confusing non-chronological account. Livy's summaries indicate that Livy wrote chronologically, but the details of the original Livian volumes are lost. Other sources such as Diodorus (via Photius), Florus, and Velleius Paterclus recount events non-chronologically. There were two main theatres of the war, with one in the north and one in the south. There also was an abortive attempt to incite rebellion in Etruria and Umbria, but the Romans moved quickly and brutally to suppress it. The northern theatre was centred on Asculum (in the lands of the Piceni and Marsi) with the southern theatre in Samnium, Lucania, Apulia, and Campania.

The immediate reaction in Rome to the rebellion was one of confusion. After the war's start, Quintus Varius Hybrida, then a plebeian tribune, set up a permanent court searching around for conspirators who incited the Italians to war. Mouritsen writes of the court, "such stab-in-the-back theories are plausible only when no other explanation is at hand; apparently the Romans did not see any direct connection between the franchise question and the outbreak of the war". It is possible that in the early winter of 90 BC there was an abortive attempt to negotiate a peace before fighting started; if it occurred, the senate refused to negotiate.

=== 90 BC ===
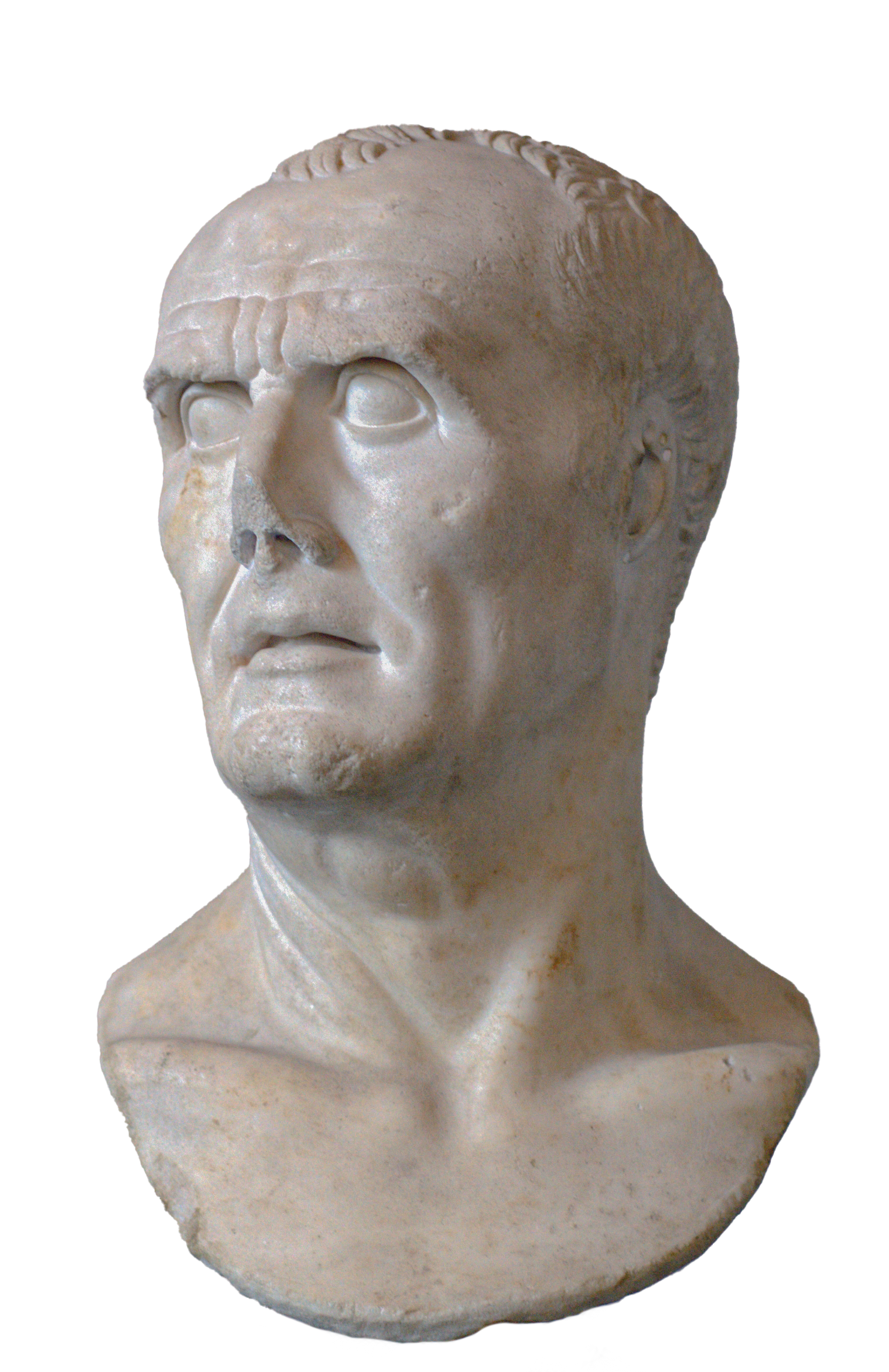
The so-called "Marius" at the Munich Glyptothek. Actual identification of the bust is disputed. The historical Marius, regardless, was a legate during the early stages of the war.

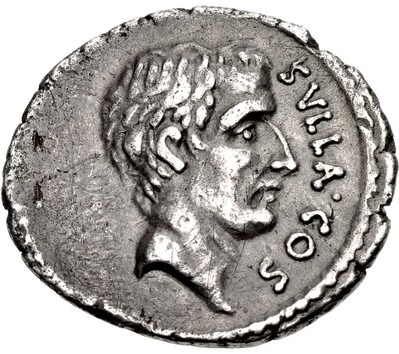
Coin of Quintus Pompeius Rufus, dated to 54 BC, which depicts Sulla. Sulla was a legate at the start of the war and was a notable victorious general in the southern theatre of the war, which led to his election as consul for 88 BC.

Appian reports that the Italians at the start of the war mobilised some 100,000 men. Rome's Latin allies remained loyal. Rome also continued to control Capua and central Campania, which proved logistically vital. The consuls of the year, elected in a time of relative peace, were Lucius Julius Caesar and Publius Rutilius Lupus. The two men had access to experienced legates, both veteran commanders of the wars against Jugurtha and the Cimbri: Gaius Marius and Lucius Cornelius Sulla.

==== Initial offensive ====
The Romans levied a massive force over the winter, allowing the consuls of 90 BC to depart for war immediately. All consuls and praetors that year were assigned to Italy; the provincial governors at the start of the war had their terms continuously prorogued. According to the summary of Livy, Livy included tables of the Latin and foreign communities that sent auxiliaries to join the Romans. Modern estimates of Roman manpower exceed 140,000, split between fourteen legions (two for each consul and one each for ten legates). Rome also conscripted ships and mercenaries from its overseas allies; two triremes, for example, were taken from Heraclea Pontica on the Black Sea and returned eleven years later.

The initial Italian offensive struck in late 91 and early 90 BC. It was clearly planned with full knowledge of typical Roman strategy and operations. There was a policy of mercy toward pro-Roman combatants in the southern theatre commanded by Gaius Papius Mutilus; the war also assumed a "distinctive character" in the extent to which Roman soldiers defected to the Italians. For example, when Nola was captured, the Italians were able to induce the defection of most of the Roman soldiers (the officers refused and were starved to death).

In the initial offensive, the colony of Aesernia was put under prolonged siege: the consul Lucius Julius Caesar moved to break it but was unsuccessful; the Romans suffered further reverses, losing Venafrum, Grumentum in Lucania, and suffering defeat near Alba Fucens. The most important victories for the Italians were in Campania and Picenum. In Campania, Mutilus took Nola, Herculaneum, and Salernum, before being stopped at Acerrae from advancing on Capua. In Picenum, Gaius Vidacilius, Titus Lafrenius, and one Publius Ventidius defeated Gnaeus Pompeius Strabo at Mount Falernus and forced him to take refuge at Firmum. Vidacilius took the opportunity then to advance down the eastern Italian coast into Apulia, taking Canusium. Aesernia fell later in the year after repeated failures by Lucius Julius Caesar to relieve the town; turning south, Caesar attempted to stop Mutilius from forcing the fortress at Acerrae, but both sides found themselves in a series of indecisive engagements.

==== Roman breakout ====
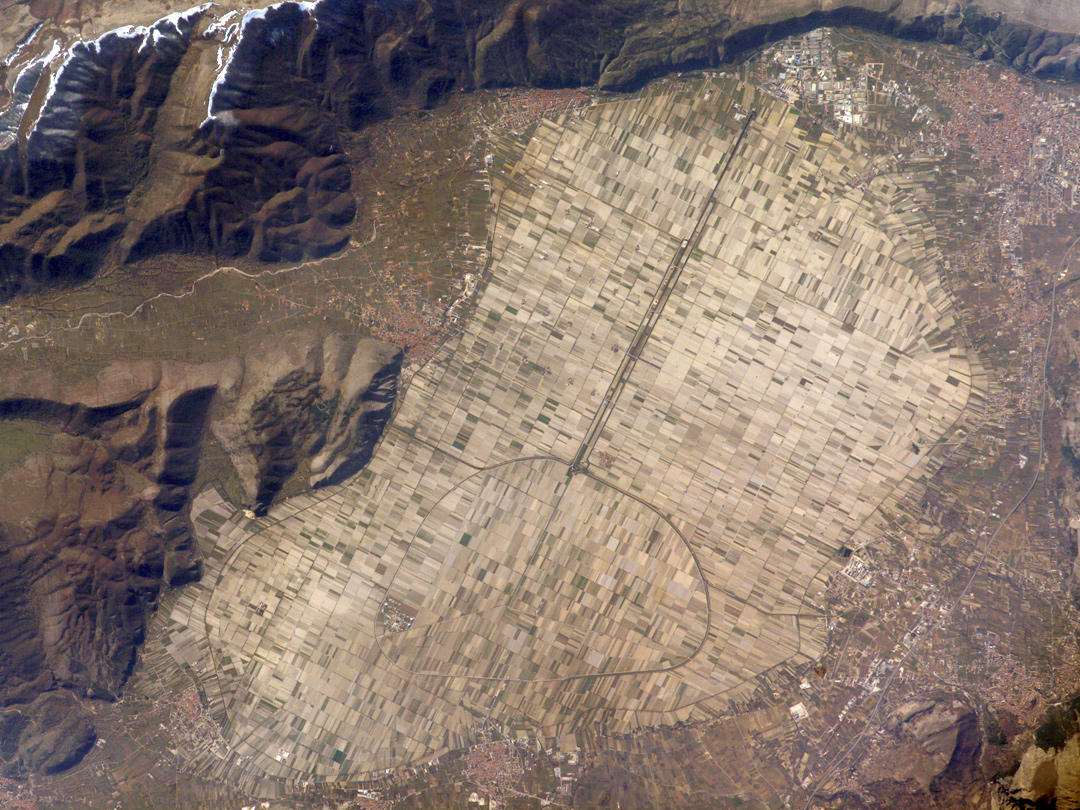
Modern image of the Fucine lake, which was drained in the 19th century. Much of the rectangular land now used for agriculture would have been inundated in ancient times. The area around the lake was strategically important and repeatedly fought over during the war.

While attempting to lead his men across a river in the northern theatre on 11 June, the consul Publius Rutilius Lupus fell in the Battle of the Tolenus River while fighting against the Marsi when his undertrained men were routed during the crossing. After this battle, when the huge number of bodies returned to Rome caused a panic, the senate decreed that war dead should in the future be buried on the field. In this same engagement, Gaius Marius, another of Rutilius' legates and hero of the Cimbric wars, was able to pull off a decisive victory by forcing the river when alerted to the disaster by the bodies that flowed downstream; he eventually assumed command after Rutilius' replacement was assassinated at false surrender negotiations. Marius, assisted by a flanking manoeuvre by Lucius Cornelius Sulla, then inflicted a defeat on the Marsi near the Fucine Lake, which split the Italians in two.

Sextus Julius Caesar, consul in 91 BC and promagistrate this year, moved to relieve Firmum some time in October. Between Sextus' army and Pompey Strabo's forces, Lafrenius' forces were routed and forced into Asculum, which was then besieged by Strabo. Sextus' forces then forced back Vidacilius into Apulia and placed it too under siege in December. The northern front of the war largely collapsed after these victories. Attempts to incite rebellion in Etruria and Umbria could have opened a third front against Rome, but were quickly suppressed; Appian notes also that the senate acceded to garrisoning Cumae with freedmen, recruited into the army for the first time.

With a collapsing northern front and the division of the Italians into two, Italian defeat became largely inevitable. The Italians attempted opening negotiations, inviting Mithridates VI Eupator of Pontus to invade, but Mithridates responded equivocally. As Rome started to gain the upper hand, the senate decreed some time around October that consul Lucius Julius Caesar should bring legislation allowing any Italian community that had not revolted or otherwise promptly laid down their arms to elect Roman citizenship. This was passed and became the lex Julia de civitate; it also removed one of the main causes of the war – be it demands for citizenship or for security of land holdings – and provided that new tribes would be created for new citizens. Between the citizenship law and the costs of the war, only the Italian hard-liners remained in the field.

=== 89 BC ===
The new consuls for 89 BC were Gnaeus Pompeius Strabo and Lucius Porcius Cato. In January, the Marsi attempted to support the rebellions in Etruria and Umbria. The two consuls moved to intercept the Marsi, who were commanded by Titus Vettius Scato. Strabo defeated the Marsi near Asculum, forcing them into retreat across the snowy mountains. Cato, taking command from Marius, defeated the Marsi near the Fucine lake, but was himself killed in battle. It is likely that Cato was killed early in the year, leaving only Strabo as consul for the remainder of 89.

The Romans continued on the offensive against the Marsi, under the command of legates Lucius Cornelius Cinna and Marcus Caecilius Cornutus, and forced the Marsi to petition for peace. These victories allowed the Romans a free hand in the siege of Asculum and freedom to attack into southern theatre from the north. Corfinium was also taken, forcing the Italians to transfer their capital to Bovianum. The Romans also subjugated the Vestini and the Marrucini. By summer, the Romans had pacified the northern theatre, except for Asculum, which was still under siege.

Rome also took the offensive in the south. Sulla, commanding an army and supported by a fleet, besieged Nola and took Pompeii, defeating an attempt to relieve the cities by Lucius Cluentius. After the capture of Pompeii, Sulla quickly took Stabiae and Herculaneum by June. Sulla then moved into Samnium, subjugating the Hirpini and giving gentle terms, before taking Bovianum by September after a bitter struggle, forcing the Italians to move their capital again to Aesernia (now under their full control). That year, Sulla stood for and won the consulship of 88 BC, with Quintus Pompeius Rufus as his colleague.

Asculum surrendered in November 89 BC after its commander, Vidacilius, committed suicide. For this victory, Pompey Strabo celebrated a triumph on 25 December over Asculum and Picenum. Strabo, however, infamously refused to give any of the plunder to the state, even though the public treasury was empty. Further legislation was enacted to extend the citizenship with the passage of the lex Plautia Papiria (though the Samnites and Lucanians, still under arms, were excepted). New legislation was also brought by Pompey Strabo to incorporate new colonies in Transpadane Gaul with Latin rights. The reorganisation of Italy also required the formation of new municipia as well as surveying of their lands and establishment of their charters. This longer process would continue until the age of Caesar.

=== 88 and 87 BC ===
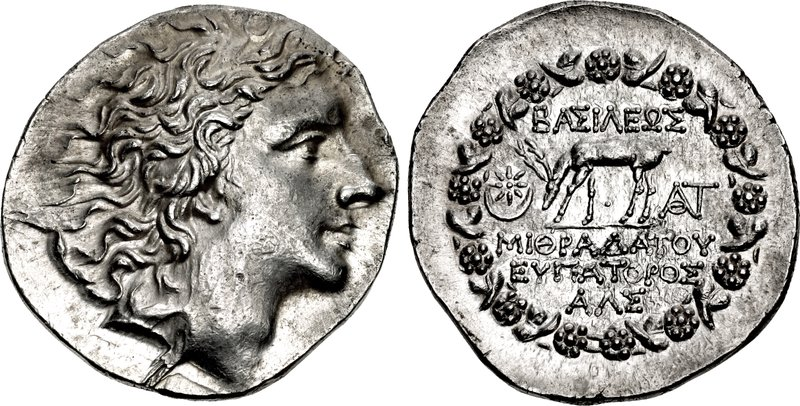
Coin depicting Mithridates VI Eupator. On the right, it displays in Greek, his title as basileos, followed by his name. His invasion of Roman Asia in 89 BC triggered the First Mithridatic War.

By 88 BC, the war was largely over, except for some isolated holdouts. Elections for the consulship of 88 were delayed by Pompey Strabo's late return to the city, but eventually returned Lucius Cornelius Sulla and Quintus Pompeius Rufus. The senate, troubled by news of Mithridates VI Eupator's invasion of Asia in the east, assigned neither consul to commands against the Italians; Sulla by lot was assigned the command against Mithridates.

Early in the year, Pompey Strabo's command in the northern theatre was prorogued and he quickly accepted the surrender of multiple Italian towns and communities, putting an effective end to the war in the north. The remaining northern insurgents fled south to Samnium and Apulia, where the Italians still controlled large tracts of territory. The Italians reorganised around Quintus Poppaedius Silo and designated him supreme commander; according to Diodorus, Silo commanded a force of some 50,000 men, which would have been wildly insufficient to defeat the Romans. Regardless, Silo was able to reverse Roman advances in Samnium and also recapture Bovianum. He then crossed the Apennines and engaged Quintus Caecilius Metellus Pius in Apulia, where his forces were badly defeated and Silo was killed.

Following Silo's death, Italian organised resistance collapsed. For Livy and Appian, his death marks the end of the war. However, a remnant of Samnite and Lucanian rebels fought on in Bruttium and even sent appeals to Mithridates of Pontus for an intervention in Italy. Faced with death or slavery, they refused to surrender. Late in 88 or in 87, after Sulla's departure for the east, this rebel force unsuccessfully attacked Isiae and Rhegium near the Strait of Messina. The outbreak of a short civil war at Rome in 87 BC allowed them to nonetheless reach a negotiated settlement with the weakened Roman government; the rebels sided with the faction of Lucius Cornelius Cinna and Gaius Marius after being promised citizenship, the return of hostages and deserters, and the return of all loot taken by the Romans.

== Impact ==
Even in ancient times the conflict was perplexing and the final outcome of the war or its immediate impacts were not entirely clear. One can interpret the terms under which the various Italian communities at different times reached with the Roman state as victory for either Italians or Romans or alternatively as a negotiated stalemate.

=== Economic and legal ===
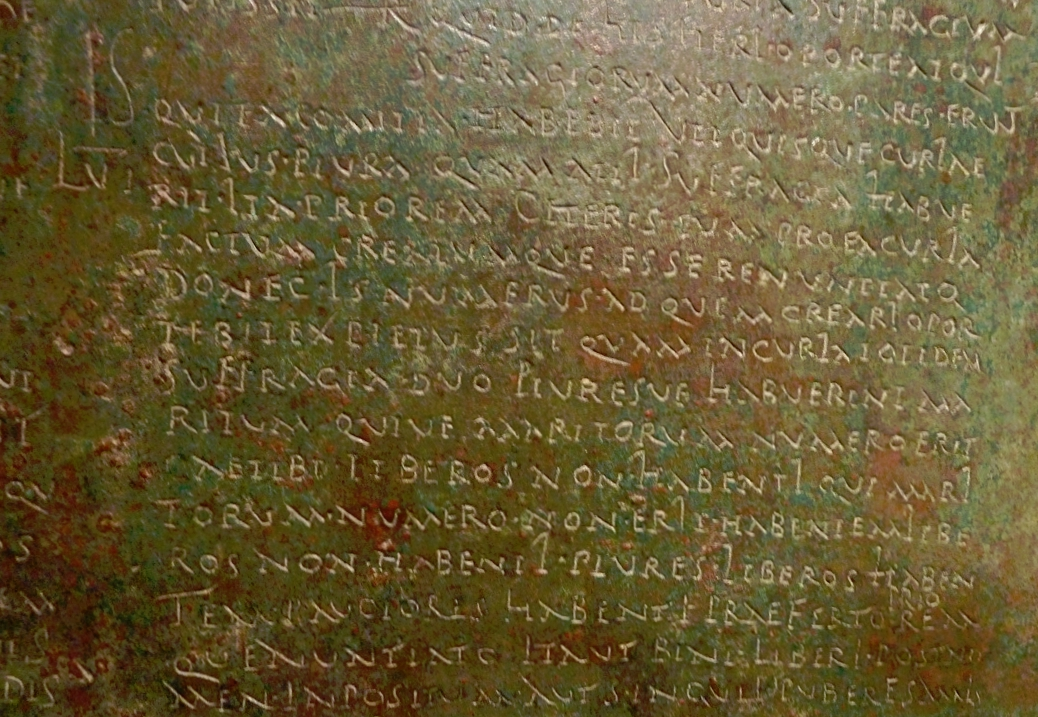
This bronze tablet contains the lex Malacitana, a 1st century AD municipal charter for Malaca – modern Málaga – in Spain. Similar municipal laws, predecessors to the later Flavian-era laws, would have been drawn up through Italy in the aftermath of the war.

The war was a "supreme effort" on both sides. For example, Appian reports the need for soldiers was so great that freedmen were for the first time inducted into the army. Edward Bispham, in a Companion to Roman Italy, notes that the republic "never minted more silver denarii than during the conflict", indicating the financial strain imposed on the Roman state in supplying and paying for an unprecedented number of troops. Devastation of the war in the central and southern portions of Italy was "profound". Archaeological evidence points towards the Social war, along with the following Sullan civil war, devastating the central Apennines. The literary sources indicate that after these conflicts much of the Italian countryside was both lawless, as men strove to take advantage of the breakdown in order, and miserable.

The extension of citizenship to the allies also redrew the political and legal maps of Italy. In place of the former sovereign and autonomous Italian communities, there was a sea of Roman citizen municipia. Municipal constitutions dating from time immemorial over the next decades were replaced by laws and charters passed under the auspices of the comitia in Rome. The varying magistrates of the Italian city-states were largely replaced by a relatively uniform quattorvirate of city magistrates and more rarely with a duovirate. The dating of this municipalisation process is not entirely straightforward: the formation of the quattorvirates likely dates to the Cinnanum tempus; a uniform and generalised lex municipalis came only during the time of Caesar and Augustus.

=== Enrolment of new citizens ===
One of the main issues in 88 BC (the consulship of Lucius Cornelius Sulla) was how the newly enfranchised Italian citizens would be enrolled into the Roman tribes. The thirty-five tribes made up the comitia tributa, a Roman popular legislative and electoral assembly. With each tribe getting one vote irrespective of population and with tribal status being hereditary, how the enormous multitude of Italian citizens were tribally organised would sway politics for generations.

The first proposals, emerging during the Social War itself, were merely to expand the number of tribes and to allot the Italians to those new tribes. This solution was also elegantly traditional: Rome's tribes had in the past been adduced to represent citizens living in new territories, though the last time this had been done was in 242 BC. Plans were made to create possibly two or eight new tribes, pursuant to the lex Julia, which would deprive the overwhelming number of new citizens of much of their political influence. Appian further posits this number may have been ten. During Sulla's consulship, one of the tribunes of the plebs, Publius Sulpicius Rufus, challenged this plan. He brought and passed legislation, possibly by force, which would have the new citizens inscribed in the existing thirty-five tribes instead; he could only bring that proposal successfully with the support of Marius, whom he won over with the promise of the Mithridatic command. But his legislation was abrogated after Sulla – at the time continuing the siege at Nola – marched on Rome in response to the Mithridatic reassignment.

After Lucius Cornelius Cinna took control of the city, espousing the cause of Italian suffrage, he settled the matter in favour of distributing the new citizens among the old tribes, which was confirmed during and after Sulla's civil war both by the victor and the senate. This process started only in 70 BC with the election of new censors, who very likely stepped down before the census was complete. This was not helped by the irregular election of censors after the Social war: only two pairs completed their tasks (those of 86 and 70 BC). The process of registering those new citizens, however, took many years – probably delayed by Rome's purposeful inaction – and was completed only in the Augustan era.

The new citizens that were enrolled after the Social war also were distributed across the whole of the Italian peninsula. Only a few had the means to travel to Rome and vote in person. Those nearer the city likely had little connection to Rome's oligarchic political system. This new electorate was therefore de facto more concentrated into those who had vested personal interests in the elections. Moreover, because no censuses were held to reclassify citizens on their wealth, those grandfathered into the upper centuriae who had fallen on harder times sold their votes to the highest bidders. The distribution of the tribes across the whole of Italy also empowered magnates close to Rome, whose votes were few and the focus of much political and financial attention.

The impact of these new Italian citizens was felt, for example, in the legislation recalling Cicero from exile in 58 BC. It passed due to the support of the Italian landowners who had been enfranchised by the conflict, using Italian enfranchisement to support Italian political champions.

=== Destabilisation of the republic ===
The immediate aftermath of the war proved grounds for continued conflict. Beyond the unrest associated with Sulpicius' tribunate and Sulla's overturning of Sulpicius' laws, the continuing dispute over enfranchisement was one of the factors which motivated men to support Lucius Cornelius Cinna, who posed as a champion for the Italians to gain their support during the bellum Octavianum. Both Cinna and Gnaeus Papirius Carbo, during preparations for civil war against Sulla, stoked fears that Sulla might – if victorious – strip some Italians of their hard-won citizenship rights by abrogating Cinna-era legislation.

Longer-term impacts also were triggered by the war's change in political norms. In the immediate sense, of domestic politics in the period 91–88 BC, nothing at all can be said with certainty. But the war's extensive militarisation of Italy triggered an opening for generals to grab political power:

[It brought] for the first time in over a hundred years... large-scale military campaigning back to Italian soil. The impact on Roman politics was profound as well as instantaneous. Already in 88, Sulla exploited the presence of standing armies in Italy to seize power and for a period suspended the republican government altogether... [the war] offered unprecedented opportunities for generals to grab power.

The war also politicised the Roman army and broke down civil-military norms. Defections, lax discipline, and mutinies were tolerated as commanders could not afford to lose the support of the men. Conflict with the Italians also blurred the distinction between Romans and foreign enemies: for Andrew Lintott, "Roman armies were only to be used for civil war after their scruples had been drowned in a blood-bath of fighting with their own Italian allies... it may as well be argued that civil war created the self-seeking unprincipled soldier as the converse".

Harriet Flower, in the influential 2010 book Roman Republics, further speculates that the conflict may have driven a wedge between the common soldiery and the voters at Rome, reducing their loyalty to the state. Combined, these factors made the republic's victory in the Social war "a Pyrrhic one at best", creating "both Sulla the consul and Sulla's own particular kind of client army that was willing to march on Rome at his bidding, for the first time in Roman history".

== Historiography ==
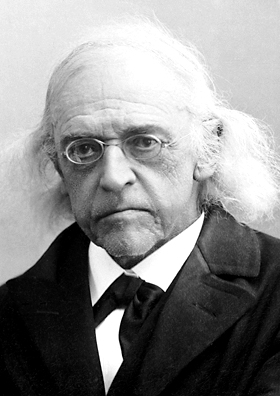
Theodor Mommsen, pictured in 1902, put forward the proposition that the Italians had been fighting first for Roman citizenship then for independence.

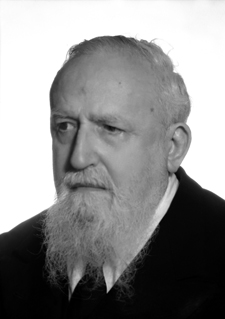
Gaetano De Sanctis brought a similar view as that of Mommsen, interpreting Italian war goals in the context of Italian risorgimento.

Views on the Social war have changed over the years. For many years, scholars accepted the Appianic account of demands for Roman citizenship. More recently, however, a "much debated" re-evaluation emerged with the publication of Henrik Mouritsen's Italian Unification in 1998, which read the war not as a struggle for citizenship and political equality, as depicted in imperial accounts, but rather as an attempt by certain Italian allies to throw off the Roman yoke. Archaeological evidence also has continued to show substantial heterogeneity prior to Roman assumption of direct rule over the peninsula. These field surveys have brought up new work in reassessing the extent of Italian regionalism in economic, military, and social terms.

=== Ancient accounts ===
Most of the ancient accounts attributed the war to allied demands for citizenship. However, these accounts were written in the aftermath of the war, which extended that citizenship, and largely fail to justify how citizenship became an Italian demand. The core surviving source is Appian; other literary accounts – such as those of Lucius Cornelius Sisenna, Lucullus, Sulla, Diodorus Siculus, and Livy (who wrote more on the Social war than the Second Punic War) – are fragmentary or lost. No Italian perspectives survive, except that which can be gleamed from the few Italian coins.

The earliest accounts of the Social war emerge before the fall of the republic. The first is an excerpt of what is believed to be Posidonius' history of Rome preserved by Diodorus Siculus via Photius. It was written some time between 70 and 65 BC and describes two Italian motives: demands for citizenship which were refused and rebellion against Roman hegemony ("The Italians, who so many times before had fought with distinction on behalf of Rome's hegemonia, were now risking life and limb to secure their own").

The sources also attribute to the allies demands for libertas, a broad term describing legal protections against unjust punishment, the vote, the right to appeal, and the rule of law. Sources voicing demands for libertas include Rhetorica ad Herennium, in which a speech is putatively being given before the quaestio Varia in which the Italians are painted as rebelling against Roman rule. The later poet Ovid also sings of the Paeligni, which Ovid claims had been "compelled to honest arms" by their "love of liberty" (either from Roman hegemony or the burdens of their alliances). An explicit statement to this effect comes also from Strabo, where the Italians rose up seeking liberty, citizenship, and equality with the Romans. Similarly, Eutropius attributes the insurgents as fighting for "equal freedom".

=== Modern accounts ===
The first coherent study of the Social War was conducted by Prosper Mérimée in 1841. The first modern narrative history, done by Adolf Kiene in 1844, established the narrative separation between northern and southern fronts and cast the consuls of 90 BC as engaging in a personalistic feud with their Italian counterparts. Kiene also was the first to recognise the impact and occurrence of delays in the registration of the new citizens.

Theodor Mommsen was the first to break from the ancient accounts, arguing that the Italian goals shifted during the war from citizenship before the war to independence during it, viewing this as a consequence of the Italian's parallel political institutions established at Corfinium and their christening of a new state called Italia. Other historians also hold this view, including Gaetano De Sanctis (drawing parallels between the Social War–era Italians and 19th-century risorgimento) and, most influentially and radically, Henrik Mouritsen.

Mouritsen's account, in the 1998 book Italian Unification, paints the dominant Appianic narrative as being coloured by his 2nd-century AD imperialist world view and thereby creating an anachronistic and inaccurate interpretation of first century Italian war goals. He identifies two separate traditions, one for citizenship and one for independence. Mouritsen's account has been extremely influential in recent research, both in terms of a more convincing reconstruction of the war's start, especially in a non-teleological manner, but also in triggering scholarly re-evaluation of Romanisation in Italy and Italian war goals more generally. It has not, however, won universal acceptance. Other scholars have also connected the burdens of allied service in the Roman army with resentment against segregation and mistreatment.

== See also ==
- Coinage of the Social War
- List of Roman civil wars and revolts
