= Gnaeus Pompeius Strabo =

Roman general, consul in 89 BC, father of Pompey

- Born: c. 135 BC
- Died: 87 BC; Outside Rome, Italy
- Office: Legate, Italy (90 BC); Consul (89 BC); Proconsul, Italy (88–87 BC)
- Children: Pompey and Pompeia
- Parents: Sextus Pompeius (father); Lucilia (mother)

Military service
- Battles/wars: Social War; Bellum Octavianum
- Awards: Triumph

Gnaeus Pompeius Strabo (c. 135 – 87 BC) was a Roman general and politician, who served as consul in 89 BC. He is often referred to in English as Pompey Strabo, to distinguish him from his son, the famous Pompey the Great, or from Strabo the geographer.

The cognomen Strabo means "cross-eyed". Pompeius Strabo lived in the Roman Republic and was born and raised in a noble family in Picenum (in the modern regions of Marche and Abruzzo respectively) in central Italy, on the Adriatic Coast. Strabo's mother was called Lucilia. Lucilia's family originated from Suessa Aurunca (modern Sessa Aurunca), and she was a sister of satiric poet Gaius Lucilius. Lucilius was a friend of Roman general Scipio Aemilianus. Strabo's paternal grandfather was Gnaeus Pompeius, while his father was Sextus Pompeius. His elder brother was Sextus Pompeius, and his sister was Pompeia.

== Career ==
Strabo was a prominent member of the Pompeii, a noble family in Picenum, in central Italy. The Pompeii had become the richest and most prominent family of the region, and had a large clientele and a lot of influence in Picenum and Rome. Despite the anti-rural prejudice of the Roman Senate, the Pompeii could not be ignored. After serving in the military, probably as a military tribune, Strabo climbed the cursus honorum and became promagistrate in Sicily 93 BC and consul in the year 89 BC, in the midst of the Social War.

=== Social war ===
Despite Strabo's provincial roots, he and his family were Roman citizens and therefore took up Rome's cause during the civil war the Republic fought against its Italian Allies. He commanded his forces against the Italian rebels in the northern part of Italy. First, he recruited three or four legions in his native Picenum; then he marched them south against the rebels. In 90 BC, while marching his legions south through Picenum, he was suddenly attacked by a large force of Picentes, Vestini, and Marsi. Although the battle favoured neither side, Strabo was heavily outnumbered, and he decided to withdraw. Eventually, he found himself blockaded in Picenum, but in the autumn of 90, he launched two sorties that successfully caught his enemies in a pincer. The remnants of the enemy army retreated to Asculum, which Strabo decided to starve into submission. Through his successful counter-offensive, he became very popular, and he used his fame to get elected as one of the consuls for 89 BC, his consular partner being Lucius Porcius Cato. Strabo attacked and defeated a rebel column trying to march into Etruria, killing 5,000 rebels. Another 5,000 died while trying to get back across the Apennines. Strabo's consular colleague Lucius Porcius Cato engaged the Marsi in battle near Fucine Lake (close to Alba Fucensis), but he died in an attempt to storm the enemy camp; this left Strabo as sole consul. The exact details of the siege of Asculum and the reduction of the neighbouring tribes are obscure. We hear of a huge battle near Asculum, where Strabo defeated an Italian relief army of 60,000 men. Soon after Asculum fell, Strabo had the rebel leaders whipped and executed, and auctioned off all of their belongings. He kept the proceeds of these sales, an action which might explain his reputation for greed. At the end of his term as consul, Strabo apparently sought a second immediate consulship for the year 88 BC – an act that was not illegal, as the case of Gaius Marius demonstrates in the late second century, but was highly irregular nonetheless. Strabo evidently failed in his attempt, as Lucius Cornelius Sulla and Quintus Pompeius Rufus were elected consuls.

=== Triumph ===
Strabo celebrated a triumph for his victories against the Italian Allies on 27 December 89. After his consulship expired a few days later, he retired to Picenum with all of his veteran soldiers. He did not disband his army but kept it in the field. The Senate soon transferred command of his army to Quintus Pompeius Rufus, one of the new consuls. However, when Pompeius Rufus arrived, he was murdered by Strabo's soldiers. Strabo did not interfere when Sulla marched on and took Rome in 88 BC. He remained in Picenum until 87 BC, when he responded to the Senate's request for help against Gaius Marius and Lucius Cornelius Cinna, who were also marching their forces on Rome. Strabo took his army to Rome; he did, however, not decisively commit to either side, instead playing both against the other. For this, Publius Rutilius Rufus referred to him as "the vilest man alive". When negotiations with the Cinna-Marian faction fell through, he did, however, attack Quintus Sertorius, one of Cinna's commanders, who was positioned north of the city, but the attack was without success.

== Death ==
In 87 BC, Strabo and his army established their camp outside the Colline Gate. The unsanitary conditions of the camp led to an outbreak of disease among his troops. Strabo himself caught dysentery and died a few days later, still in his camp outside the Colline Gate. His avarice and cruelty had made him hated by the soldiers to such a degree that they tore his corpse from the bier and dragged it through the streets. Another story expounded by Plutarch claimed that the general died after being struck by lightning.

His son, Pompey the Great, took the legions back to Picenum. He would use them to support Sulla a few years later.

Strabo had at least two children: a son, Gnaeus Pompeius Magnus, and a daughter, Pompeia, who married Gaius Memmius and then Publius Cornelius Sulla.

In his honour, his name was given to the cities of Alba Pompeia and Laus Pompeia.

Political offices
Preceded by L. Julius Caesar; P. Rutilius Lupus	Roman consul 89 BC; With: Lucius Porcius Cato	Succeeded by L. Cornelius Sulla; Q. Pompeius Rufus
