= Battle of Tridentum =

Battle in 102 BC

- Part of the Cimbrian War
| Date | 102 BC |
| Location | in the valley north of Tridentum (modern day Trento, Italy) |
| Result | Roman tactical withdraw |

Belligerents
| Roman Republic | Cimbri |

Commanders and leaders
| Quintus Lutatius Catulus | Boiorix |

Strength
| Total: 6 legions (20,000–30,000 legionaries) Engaged: 1 legion, the Samnites | Total: 400,000 (c. 120,000 warriors) Engaged: Unknown |

Casualties and losses
| Light | Light |

The Battle of Tridentum took place in a valley just beyond Tridentum in the Autumn of 102 BC. The Germanic Cimbri almost succeeded in overrunning a Roman camp in the middle of the Roman strategical retreat. The Romans were saved by the heroic charge of the men from the Samnite legion which bought the rest of the army enough time to cross the river and escape. Despite some light losses a disaster was averted.

== Background ==
The migrations of the Cimbri and the Teutons. Roman victories. Cimbri and Teutons victories.

According to ancient sources, sometime around 120–115 BC, the Cimbri, a large Germanic tribe, left their homeland around the North Sea (in modern-day Denmark) due to climate changes. It is likely that they journeyed to the south-east and were soon joined by their neighbours the Teutones. On their way south they defeated several other Germanic, Celtic and Germano-Celtic tribes (such as the Boii). A number of these defeated tribes joined their migration. In 113 BC the Cimbri-Teutones confederation, led by Boiorix and Teutobod, defeated the Scordisci. The invaders then moved on to the Danube, arriving in Noricum, home to the Roman-allied Taurisci people. Unable to hold back these new, powerful invaders on their own, the Taurisci appealed to Rome for help.

The Romans tried to stop the Germanic invaders in 112 at the Battle of Noreia, in 107 at the Battle of Burdigala, and in 105 at the Battle of Arausio but met with defeat each time. The Battle of Arausio was considered the Romans' greatest defeat since Hannibal crushed their army at Cannae. Fortunately for the Romans, the Germans did not invade Italy after their victories but travelled through Gaul and Hispania instead. For a decade the Romans lived in fear of a Germanic invasion they thought would arrive at any moment.

Rome now turned to their most effective and capable general, Gaius Marius, whom they elected Senior Consul in 104 BC, 103 BC and 102 BC (eventually Marius would be consul an unprecedented seven times). While waiting for the Germanic tribes to move towards Italy Marius recruited, equipped and trained his army. In 102 BC Marius sent his consular partner, the junior Consul Quintus Lutatius Catulus, to Cisalpine Gaul with instructions to stop the Cimbri advance, while he marched against the Teutones in Transalpine Gaul.

== Prelude ==
Catulus marched his army to Tridentum, a small trading town in one of the valleys in the Alps. From Tridentum he advanced up the valley to where it narrowed considerably. Catulus may have intended to use the valley's narrowness to his advantage because the Cimbri heavily outnumbered him. However, eventually the Romans decided on a strategical retreat.

== Battle ==
By this time the Cimbri had become fully aware of the Roman presence, and decided to attack. The Cimbri first came across the camp of the Samnite Legion. The commander of the legion, the military tribune Marcus Aemilius Scaurus Junior, did not know what to do so the legion's Primus Pilus, Centurion Gnaeus Petreius acted instead. He led a heroic charge against the Cimbri to keep the advancing barbarians occupied long enough to give the rest of the men the opportunity to cross the river and escape. The Samnites got their men and wagons across the River Athesis and destroyed the bridge to prevent the Cimbri from following. There were, of course, some losses but the situation, humiliating as it was, was not as bad as it might have been.

== Aftermath ==
For his actions, the aforementioned Primus pilus Gnaeus Petreius Atinas was awarded the Grass Crown, the highest military honor able to be bestowed upon a Roman soldier, which was only awarded when the actions of the recipient ensured the survival of the legion which offered it. At the time, Gnaeus Petreius Atinas was only the sixth Roman officer whose actions qualified for such a distinction.

The Cimbri now descended into the Po Valley spreading out over the area. Catulus and his staff decided that this fertile area would gain the Germanic tribes' attention for some time, long enough to give the Roman army time to regroup and link up with Marius' army. Roman citizens and Latin Rights holders were encouraged to leave the region for the time being. Catulus Caesar marched his army to Placentia where he intended to rendezvous with Marius' legions.

Marcus Aemilius Scaurus Junior was sent back to Rome to report the news to the Senate. His father, the Princeps Senatus Marcus Aemilius Scaurus, on hearing the news of his sons cowardice refused to see him and officially disowned him. Scaurus Junior then committed suicide.

Meanwhile, Marius had defeated and destroyed the Teutones at the Battle of Aquae Sextiae. The next year (101 BC) Marius and Catulus joined forces and defeated and destroyed the Cimbri at the Battle of Vercellae, finally ending the German threat.

== In fiction ==
- Colleen McCullough describes the battle in her novel The First Man in Rome, the first book in her Masters of Rome series. In her novel Gnaeus Petreius is awarded the Grass Crown for his heroism.
