= Teutobod =

2nd-century BC Teutonic king

The supposed migrations of the Teutons and the Cimbri. Cimbri and Teutons defeats. Cimbri and Teutons victories.

Teutobod was a king of the Teutons, who, together with the allied Cimbri, invaded the Roman Republic in the Cimbrian War and won a spectacular victory at the Battle of Arausio in 105 BC. He was later defeated and captured at the Battle of Aquae Sextiae in 102 BC by the Roman army led by Gaius Marius. In legend, he was known as Teutobochus or Theutobochus, a giant and king of the Teutons. Large bones discovered in France in 1613 were claimed to be his skeleton, but were later shown to belong to the extinct elephant-relative Deinotherium.

== Life ==
In the late 2nd century BC, together with their neighbors, allies, and possible relatives, the Cimbri, the Teutons attacked south into the Danube valley, southern Gaul and northern Italy. Here they began to intrude upon the lands of Rome (Julius Caesar, in his Gallic Wars account De Bello Gallico, reports that it was the Boii who had attacked Noricum). The inevitable conflict which followed is called the Cimbrian War. The Cimbri (under their King Boiorix) and the Teutons, won the opening battles of this war, defeating tribes allied with the Romans and destroying a huge Roman army at the Battle of Arausio in 105 BC. But Rome regrouped and reorganized under Consul Gaius Marius. In 104 BC the Cimbri left the Rhône valley to raid Spain, while the Teutons remained in Gaul, still strong but not powerful enough to march on Rome on their own. This gave Marius time to build a new army and in 102 BC he moved against the Teutons. At the Battle of Aquae Sextiae the Teutons were virtually annihilated and Teutobod along with, reportedly, 20,000 of his people, were captured. After this, he and his tribe drop out of history. He most likely was sent to Rome for a triumphal procession to celebrate his defeat, then ritually executed afterward. The following year, the Cimbri would suffer a similar fate at the Battle of Vercellae, where two of their leaders, Caesorix and Claodicus, were captured, while two other leaders, Boiorix and Lugius, were killed.

== Teutobochus tomb hoax ==
In 1613, a gravestone engraved with the name "Theutobochus Rex" was reputedly excavated from a sand pit in the vicinity of Langon, near Montrigaud in southeast France, also reputedly alongside enormous bones, and silver coins depicting Gaius Marius. By the 17th century popular accounts of Teutobod considered him to be a giant. A French surgeon named Mazurier exhibited these relics across France, and for some time they were located in apartments owned by Queen of France Marie de' Medici. However, the veracity of the story was quickly questioned and subject to much controversy, with a long-running dispute via an exchange of pamphlets between the University of Paris surgeon Nicholas Habicot, who argued for a giant identity, and botany student and anatomist Jean Riolan who argued based on comparative anatomy that the bones represented some kind of large animal (in Riolan's opinion likely an elephant), and that the supposed discovery was either mistaken or a fraud.

21 years later in 1634, French polymath Nicolas-Claude Fabri de Peiresc asked the physician Nivolet to investigate the site and the relics (except the tombstone, which was now missing). Following the details of a report that Nivolet sent to him Peiresc concluded that the story was a hoax (based on the fact that the coins were actually from Massalia and did not depict Marius, and that it was unlikely a Germanic leader would have a gravestone written in Latin which he and his people did not speak) and later after another discovery of another supposed giant within the vicinity of Montrigaud, like Riolan concluded the remains represented those of an elephant. The bones were eventually handed over to the French National Museum of Natural History, and were centuries later recognised as belonging to Deinotherium, an extinct relative of modern elephants.

== See also ==
- Giant human skeletons
- Giant of Castelnau
- Patagon
- Og
- Orestes
- List of tallest people#Disputed and unverified claims
