= 1275 Cimbria =

Main-belt asteroid

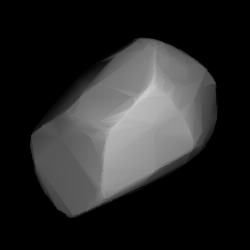
- Modelled shape of Cimbria from its lightcurve

Discovery
- Discovered by: K. Reinmuth
- Discovery site: Heidelberg Obs.
- Discovery date: 30 November 1932

Designations
- Pronunciation: /ˈsɪmbriə/
- Named after: Cimbri (ancient Germanic tribe)
- Alternative designations: 1932 WG · 1949 QL_{2} A914 TG
- Minor planet category: main-belt · (middle); Eunomia

Orbital characteristics
- Epoch 4 September 2017 (JD 2458000.5)
- Uncertainty parameter 0
- Observation arc: 84.42 yr (30,833 days)
- Aphelion: 3.1314 AU
- Perihelion: 2.2301 AU
- Semi-major axis: 2.6807 AU
- Eccentricity: 0.1681
- Orbital period (sidereal): 4.39 yr (1,603 days)
- Mean anomaly: 143.95°
- Mean motion: 0° 13^{m} 28.56^{s} / day
- Inclination: 12.877°
- Longitude of ascending node: 188.56°
- Argument of perihelion: 196.98°

Physical characteristics
- Dimensions: 18.70±4.19 km 26.31±0.30 km 27.622±0.500 km 28.65±4.4 km 30.94±4.26 km 33.599±0.594 km
- Synodic rotation period: 5.65±0.05 h 5.65454±0.00001 h 5.655±0.0023 h
- Geometric albedo: 0.0807±0.0106; 0.095±0.039; 0.1109±0.044; 0.135±0.004; 0.141±0.007; 0.25±0.13
- Spectral type: Tholen = X · X · M B–V = 0.698; U–B = 0.304
- Absolute magnitude (H): 10.426±0.001 (R) · 10.72 · 10.78 · 11.07±1.21

1275 Cimbria (prov. designation: 1932 WG) is a Eunomia asteroid from the central regions of the asteroid belt, approximately 27 kilometers (17 miles) in diameter. It was discovered on 30 November 1932, by astronomer Karl Reinmuth at the Heidelberg-Königstuhl State Observatory in southern Germany. The asteroid was named after the Cimbri, an ancient Germanic tribe.

== Orbit and classification ==
Cimbria is a member of the Eunomia family (502), a prominent family of typically stony asteroids and the largest one in the intermediate main belt with more than 5,000 members.

The asteroid orbits the Sun in the central main-belt at a distance of 2.2–3.1 AU once every 4 years and 5 months (1,603 days). Its orbit has an eccentricity of 0.17 and an inclination of 13° with respect to the ecliptic. It was first identified as A914 TG at Simeiz Observatory in October 1914. The body's observation arc begins with its official discovery observation at Heidelberg in 1932.

== Naming ==
This minor planet was named after the Cimbri, an ancient Proto-Germanic tribe that fought the Romans together with the Teutons and the Ambrones. At first victorious, they were destroyed by Gaius Marius in the Cimbrian War (113–101 BC). The official naming citation was mentioned in The Names of the Minor Planets by Paul Herget in 1955 (H 117).

== Physical characteristics ==
In the Tholen classification, Cimbria is an X-type asteroid, rather than a stony S-type asteroid, which is the overall spectral type for members of the Eunomia family.

=== Rotation period ===
In November and December 2002, two rotational lightcurves of Cimbria were obtained from photometric observations by Italian amateur astronomers Silvano Casulli, Antonio Vagnozzi, Marco Cristofanelli and Marco Paiella. Lightcurve analysis gave a well-defined rotation period of 5.65 hours with a brightness variation of 0.40 and 0.57 magnitude, respectively (U=3/3-). In December 2012, astronomers at the Palomar Transient Factory in California measured a period of 5.655 hours and an amplitude of 0.26 magnitude (U=2).

=== Poles ===
The asteroid's lightcurve has also been modeled using photometric data from the Lowell Photometric Database. It gave a concurring period of 5.65454 hours and determined two spin axis of (85.0°, −61.0°) and (271.0°, −31.0°) in ecliptic coordinates (λ, β).

=== Diameter and albedo ===
According to the surveys carried out by the Infrared Astronomical Satellite IRAS, the Japanese Akari satellite and the NEOWISE mission of NASA's Wide-field Infrared Survey Explorer, Cimbria measures between 18.70 and 33.599 kilometers in diameter and its surface has an albedo between 0.0807 and 0.25.

The Collaborative Asteroid Lightcurve Link adopts the results obtained by IRAS, that is an albedo of 0.1109 and a diameter of 28.65 kilometers based on an absolute magnitude of 10.72.
