= Cimbria =

Cimbria is derived from the name of a Germanic tribe, the Cimbri. It may also refer to:

- 1275 Cimbria, an asteroid discovered in 1932
- Cimbrian Peninsula
- SS Cimbria (1867), a German ocean liner that sank on January 19, 1883, with the loss of about four hundred lives
- Randers Cimbria, a Danish basketball team
- Cimbria, an American kit car which was the basis for a car built by Eagle Cars
