= Cymbrian flood =

Jutland peninsula flood, c. 120–114 BCE

The Cymbrian flood (or Cimbrian flood) was, according to certain Greek and Roman accounts, a large-scale incursion of the sea in the region of the Jutland peninsula in the period 120 to 114 BCE. This could have resulted in a permanent alteration of the coastline and a major loss of land.

Supposedly as a result of this flood, the Cimbri migrated south and, together with the Ambrones and Teutons, came into conflict with the Romans, precipitating the Cimbrian War (113 to 101 BCE). The much later Greek geographer Strabo, though sceptical, described the flood and its consequences thus:

As for the Cimbri, some things that are told about them are incorrect and others are extremely improbable. For instance, one could not accept such a reason for their having become a wandering and piratical folk as this that while they were dwelling on a peninsula they were driven out of their habitations by a great flood-tide; for in fact they still hold the country which they held in earlier times; and they sent as a present to Augustus the most sacred kettle in their country, with a plea for his friendship and for an amnesty of their earlier offences, and when their petition was granted they set sail for home; and it is ridiculous to suppose that they departed from their homes because they were incensed on account of a phenomenon that is natural and eternal, occurring twice every day. And the assertion that an excessive flood-tide once occurred looks like a fabrication, for when the ocean is affected in this way it is subject to increases and diminutions, but these are regulated and periodical.

The Greek philosopher and scientist Posidonius of Rhodes (c. 135 – c. 51 BCE) was critical of the Ancient tradition that the Cimbri fled their homesteads because of the flood. According to Strabo, he conjectured that "the migration of the Cimbri … from their native land arose from an encroachment of the sea that occurred not all at once". The fact that Posidonius addressed the stories about a tsunami or storm surge within his theory of the tides indicates however that he did take them seriously.

No evidence suggests an ecological disaster during this period, which was characterized by prevailing calm weather, though a singular catastrophic event may not be excluded. It is possible that the narrative alludes more generally to amphibious living conditions along the southern North Sea coast, a reality the Greeks were probably familiar with. According to Ephorus of Cyme "the Celts trained their fearlessness by enduring the engulfing of their homes and then rebuilding". In several Aristotelian texts references are made to the Celts who "take up arms and march against the waves" and "feared nothing, neither earthquakes nor the waves". A later text suggest that it were the Cimbri, who "took up arms against the flood-tides". The Proto-Germanic peoples who inhabited the area could easily be equated with the Celts and Cimbri, with whom the classical authors were more familiar. In fact, Strabo situated the Cimbri between the Rhine and Elbe Rivers.

The Cymbrian Flood was pivotal in early modern geological theories, offering an explanation for prehistoric catastrophes without invoking Noah's Flood. The belief that a major catastrophe was responsible for the formation of the English Channel gained popularity in the 16th and 17th century but was later eclipsed by Charles Lyell’s Principles of Geology (1830-33).

Dutch, Flemish, and British scholars such as Philipp Clüver and Richard Verstegan maintained that the Cymbrian Flood coincided with the Cimbri' passage through Frisia and Holland, their supposed settlement in Brabant and Flanders, and their subsequent departure for Italy. Following Strabo, they identified the Southern North Sea coast as Cimbrian Sea. It was, moreover, widely believed that the Cymbrian flood deposited large peat masses from Norway or Iceland onto the original coastal subsoil, wiping out the primeval forest and covering other parts of the Netherlands with Aeolian sands. Based on this, Frisian historian Christianus Schotanus, writing in 1658, dated the disaster to 350 BCE, predating the supposed arrival of the first Frisian colonists.

Dutch scholar Johan Picardt (1660) challenged the latter view, arguing that the bogs had formed on top of the remnants of a submerged forest. He was likely the first to introduce the term Cymbrian Flood and proposed the year 340 BCE — 240 years before the Cimbri’s defeat in Italy. This later date gained traction and is frequently cited. As late as 1844, Danish geologist Johan Georg Forchhammer (1794–1865) attributed the formation of impermeable layers beneath the Jutland heaths to the Cymbrian Flood.

The Oera Linda Book, a 19th-century forgery from Friesland, places the Cymbrian Flood in 2183 BCE, linking it to the legendary downfall of Atlantis. Following this lead, popular authors such as Nazi-scholar Herman Wirth (1885–1981) and postwar writer Jürgen Spanuth (1907–1998) have sought to push back the date of the Cymbrian flood by more than a millennium, severing its historical links with the wanderings of the Cimbri and Teutons and linking it instead with the Invasions of the Sea Peoples of the late 13th and early 12th centuries BCE, driven from their northern homelands to attack the settled kingdoms of the Mediterranean. Their controversial theories on the Atlantis legend were rejected by experts as scientifically untenable.
