= Boiorix =

King of the Cimbri tribe (died 101 BC)

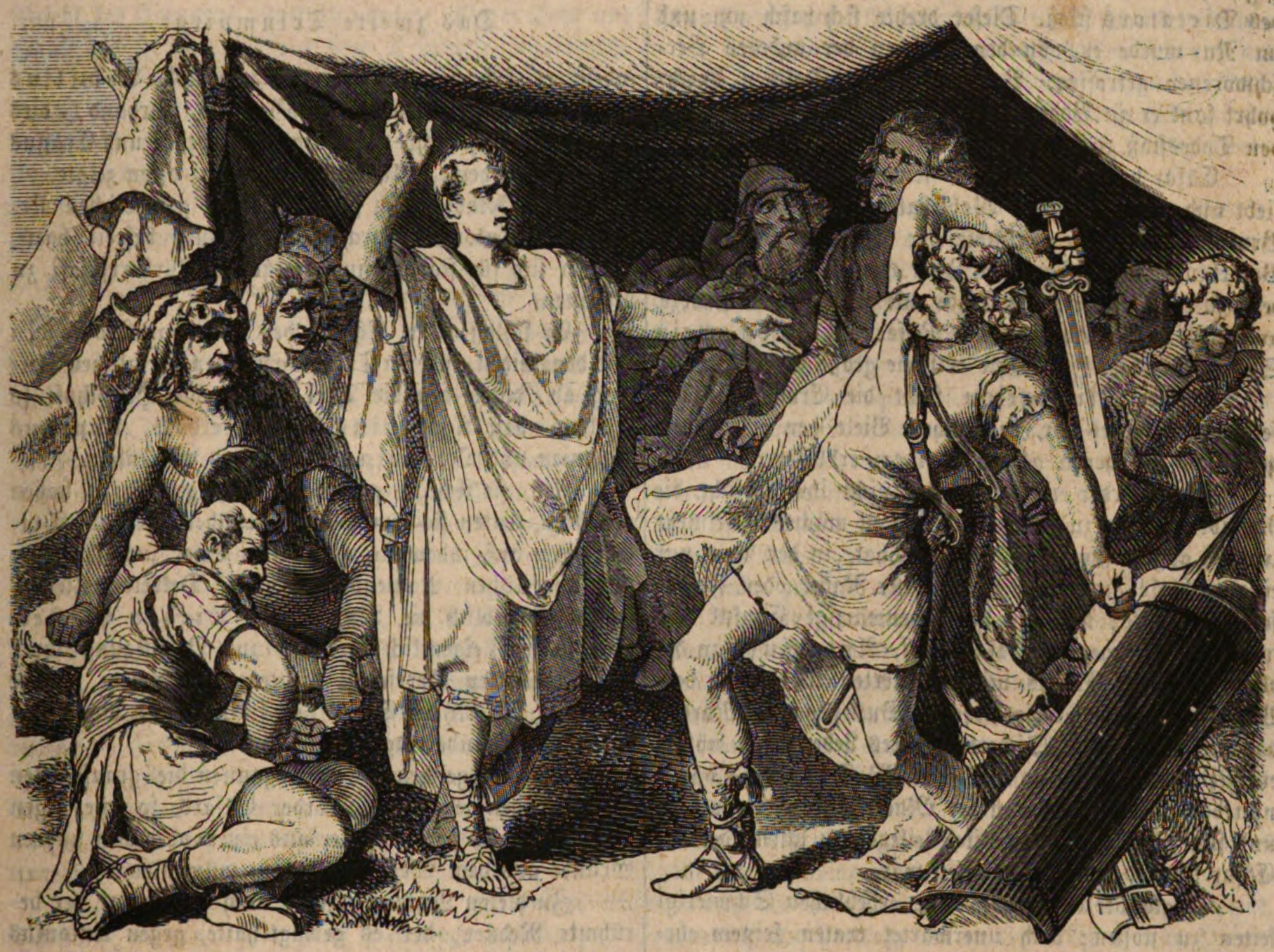
- King Boiorix strikes down the legate Marcus Aurelius Scaurus
- Died: 30 July 101 BCE
- Title: King
- Military career
- Allegiance: Cimbri
- Conflicts: Cimbrian War †

Boiorix or Boeorix (died 30 July 101 BCE) was a king of the Cimbri tribe during the Cimbrian War. He is most known for his spectacular victory against the Romans at the Battle of Arausio in 105 BC, seen as the worst Roman military defeat since the Battle of Cannae. He died at the Battle of Vercellae in 101 BC, in a last stand with his noblemen.

== Etymology ==
Boiorix's name may be Celtic, meaning "King of the Boii" (suggesting he came to prominence among the Cimbri during their march south, and was not an original inhabitant of Jutland) or perhaps "King of Strikers." It can be seen as having either Proto-Germanic or Celtic roots. It is also possible Boiorix name was Celticized as a result of his tribe living among Celtic peoples in Jutland.

== Life and Cimbrian War ==
How Boiorix became a king of the Cimbri is not known. His people, along with the Teutones, left their homelands around the Baltic Sea in the Jutland peninsula (known to the Romans as the Cimbricus Chersonesus) in Southern Scandinavia between 120-115 BC, for unclear reasons (Strabo rejected the idea of flooding). He may have led his people against the Scordisci, who the Cimbri defeated, and then marched to the Danube c. 113 BC to attack the Taurisci. The Taurisci were unable to cope with these invaders and asked Rome for help.

Boiorix's first contact with the Roman armies was at the coming Battle of Noreia, the first battle of the Cimbrian War. The consul Gnaeus Papirius Carbo ordered the Cimbri under Boiorix to depart Tauriscian lands and they complied. Carbo sent guides to lead the Cimbri away, but secretly intended to ambush them so he could gain a triumph. The Cimbri became aware of Carbo's treachery and attacked the Roman army, with adverse weather preventing the army's complete annihilation. Only 6,000 of the 30,000 soldiers escaped.

The migration of the Cimbri and the Teutons. Roman victories. Cimbri and Teutons victories.

The Cimbri then marched southwest into Gaul. After warring with some of the local tribes, the Cimbri eventually went toward Roman territories once again and came into contact with the armies of the two consuls Gnaeus Mallius Maximus and Quintus Servilius Caepio near Arausio, on October the 6th, 105 BC.

Boiorix led the Cimbri as they overwhelmed Maximus' legate, Marcus Aurelius Scaurus, seizing his cavalry camp north of the two consular armies and capturing Scaurus himself. Scaurus was brought before Boiorix, but "neither did nor said anything which was unworthy of a Roman" and advised Boiorix and the Cimbri to leave Italy or they would eventually be destroyed. Scaurus was then executed by an indignant Boiorix, who the epitome of Livy calls "a savage young man."

Due to the lack of cooperation and separation of the two Roman armies on either side of the Rhône, Boiorix and the Teutones under King Teutobod were able to engage each large Roman force individually. Caepio raided the Cimbri camp and failed, and the Cimbri then destroyed his army and sacked his camp. The tribesmen then moved and cornered the army of Maximus on the river, and slaughtered them, with very few escaping. Purportedly, 80,000 Roman soldiers and 40,000 servants and camp followers were killed by Boiorix and his warriors.

=== Tridentum and Vercellae ===
For unclear reasons, the Cimbri and Teutones did not march southeast into the vulnerable Italian peninsula, but went southwest, attempting to cross the Pyrenees into Hispania. Boiorix and his fellow tribal leaders were repulsed by the native Celtiberians and finally marched toward Italy by 104 BC, the same year Gaius Marius was elected to his second consulship. The Cimbri split from the Ambrones and Teutones, crossing the Alps through a valley near Noricum, coming out at Tridentum. Boiorix and his forces came into contact with the Roman army under Quintus Lutatius Catulus, beginning the Battle of Tridentum in 102 BC.

Catulus may have tried to use the valley to diminish the vast numerical advantage Boiorix had over him; he also built fortifications, a bridge across the Athesis River, and prepared himself for the Cimbri using neighbouring routes. His efforts were thwarted when the Boiorix and his warriors descended from the Alps, "displaying their strength and daring" by enduring the cold of the mountains and then sliding down the snow upon their shields. The Cimbri then dammed the river, beginning to break the bridge, and Catulus ordered a retreat. A heroic charge by the Primus Pilus Centurion Gnaeus Petreius Atinas kept Boiorix and his warriors stalled long enough for Catulus' army to withdraw across the Athesis and destroy the bridge. Boiorix and the Cimbri then spread throughout the Po Valley, taking advantage of the lack of defenders to plunder the land as its citizens fled. Boiorix's allies, the Teutones and Ambrones, were destroyed by Gaius Marius at the Battle of Aquae Sextiae in 102 BC.

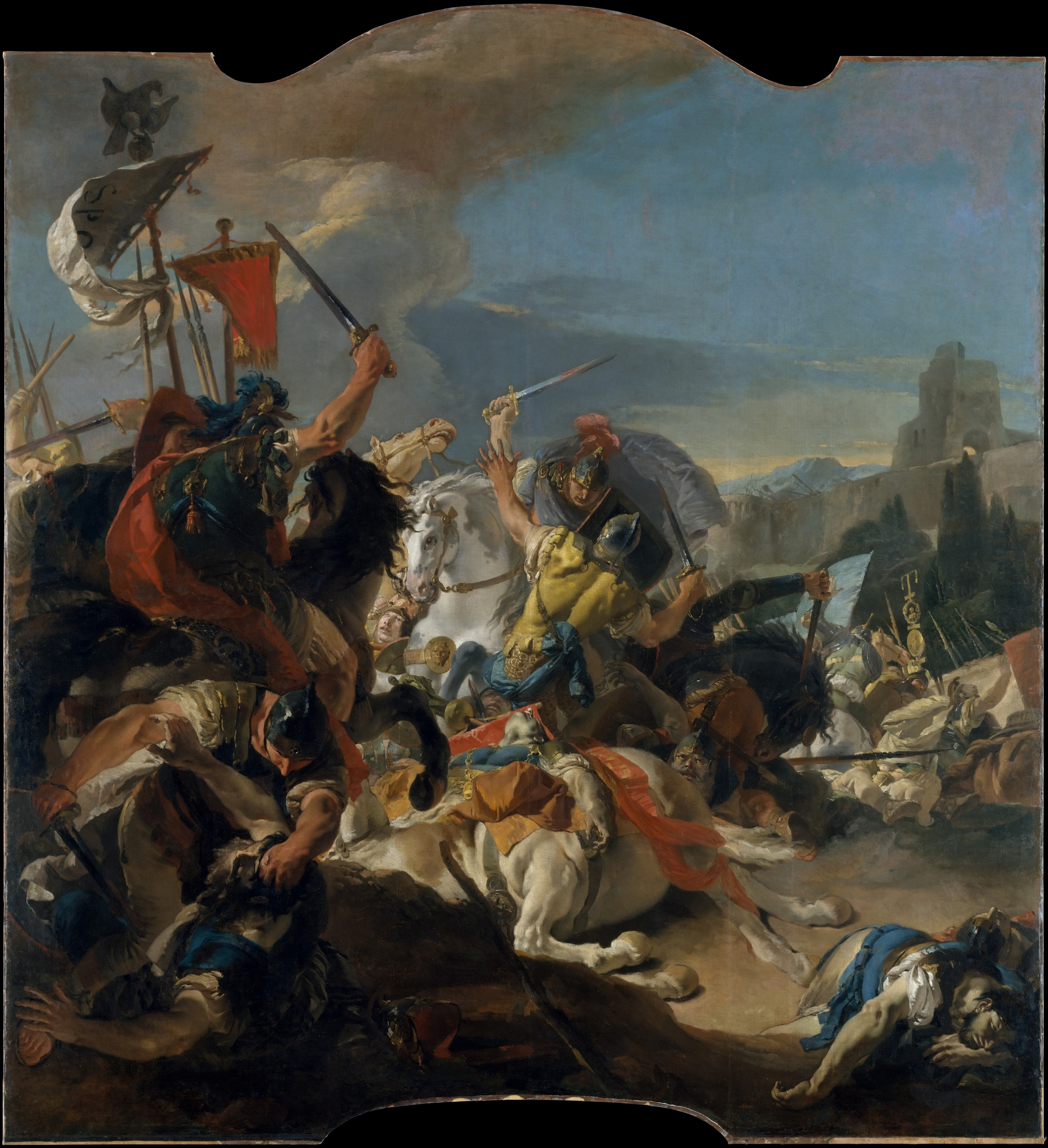
Giovanni Battista Tiepolo, The battle of Vercellae, from the Ca' Dolfin Tiepolos, 1725-1729.

In 101 BC Boiorix continued ravaging the Po Valley, perhaps moving generally westward and hoping to encounter the Teutones and Ambrones. Marius and Catulus attempted to bring him and the Cimbri to battle, but Boiorix and his ambassadors declined either out of the genuine belief their allies would soon join them, or as an excuse to continue pillaging the fertile region they were occupying. Negotiations for land were unsuccessful, and soon the Cimbri advanced against Marius. Boiorix was probably spurred by the fact that his warriors were eager for a battle, confident in a victory (the Cimbri were as yet undefeated by the Romans), and were enjoying the land they were now occupying; as well, logistically, the Cimbrian King could not afford to keep his massive host in one place for much longer. As a result, Boiorix convinced his people and sought a decisive battle.

Boiorix rode up and challenged Marius to set the time and place to fight for ownership of the region. Marius acquiesced, and outlined the plain of Vercellae (the exact location is not known). On the 30th of July, 101 BC, the Cimbri and Romans met and fought the Battle of Vercellae. Marius used the terrain, his soldiers' equipment and discipline, and his superior cavalry along with the aid of Catulus and his officers to obliterate the Cimbri. The vast majority of Boiorix's army (purportedly 120,000 warriors and even more civilians) were killed or captured. Boiorix himself was slain, along with Lugius. The other Cimbrian chiefs Claodicus and Caesorix were captured. According to the historian Theodor Mommsen:

Those might be deemed fortunate who met death in the battle, as most did, including the brave king Boiorix; more fortunate at least than those who afterwards in despair laid hands on themselves, or were obliged to seek in the slave-market of Rome the master who might retaliate on the individual Northman for the audacity of having coveted the beauteous south before it was time.
