= Battle of Aquae Sextiae =

Battle during the Cimbrian War (102 BC)

- Part of the Cimbrian War and the Roman–Germanic Wars
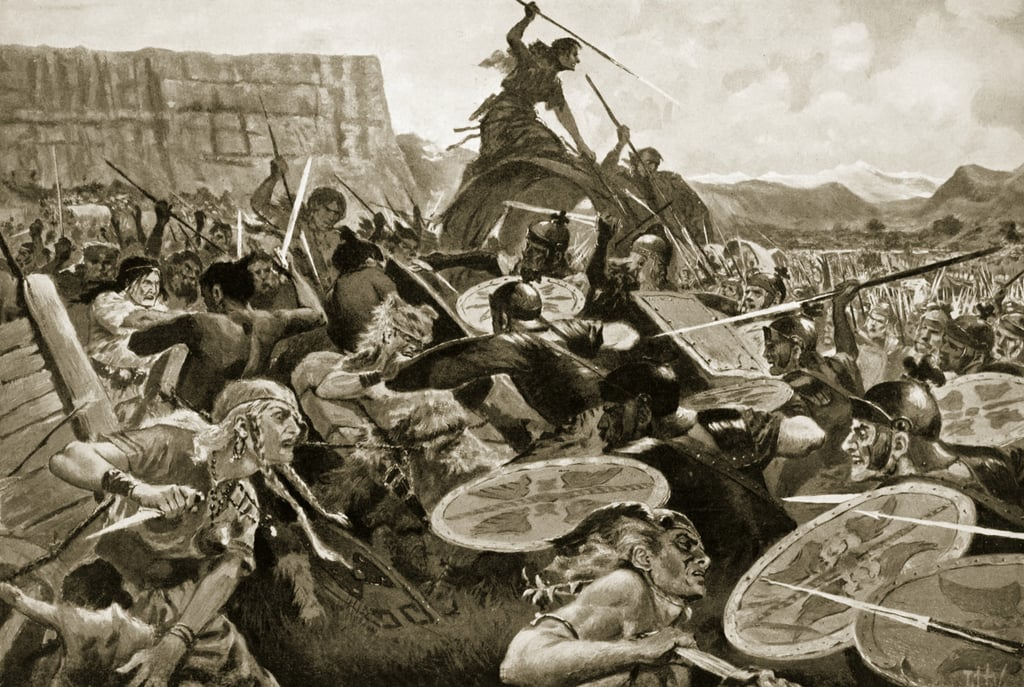
- John Harris Valda: The Battle of Aquae Sextiae in 102 BC
Date	102 BC
Location	Modern Aix-en-Provence, France 43°32′N 5°27′E
Result	Roman victory

Belligerents
Roman Republic	Teutons; Ambrones

Commanders and leaders
Gaius Marius	Teutobod (surrendered)

Strength
The Battle against the Ambrones c. 32,000–40,000 (six legions + auxiliaries) The Battle of Aquae Sextiae c. 32,000–40,000 (six legions + auxiliaries)	The Battle against the Ambrones c. 30,000 (the warriors of the Ambrones) The Battle of Aquae Sextiae c. 100,000–200,000 (the warriors of the entire tribal coalition) (Note: The entire tribal coalition numbered c. 250,000 people, one might assume c. 150,000 were women and children leaving c. 100,000 warriors.)

Casualties and losses
Unknown	100,000-120,000 dead
- Location within France Battle of Aquae Sextiae (Europe)

The migrations of the Cimbri and the Teutons Roman victories Cimbri-Teutonic victories

The Battle of Aquae Sextiae (Aix-en-Provence) took place in 102 BC. After a series of Roman defeats at the Battle of Noreia, the Battle of Burdigala, and most notably at the Battle of Arausio, the Romans under Gaius Marius finally defeated the Teutons and Ambrones as they attempted to advance through the Alps into Italy. Local lore associates the name of the mountain, Mont St. Victoire, with the Roman victory at the battle of Aquae Sextiae, but Frédéric Mistral and other scholars have debunked this theory.

== Background ==
According to ancient sources, sometime around 120–115 BC, the Germanic tribe of the Cimbri left their homeland around the North Sea due to climate changes. They supposedly journeyed to the south-east and were soon joined by their neighbours the Teutons. On their way south they defeated several other Germanic tribes, but also Celtic and Celtic-Germanic tribes. A number of these defeated tribes joined their migration. In 113 BC the Cimbri-Teutonic confederation, led by Boiorix the Cimbric king and Teutobod of the Teutons, defeated the Scordisci. The invaders then moved on to the Danube, arriving in Noricum, home to the Roman-allied Taurisci people. Unable to hold back these new, powerful invaders on their own, the Taurisci appealed to Rome for help.

The Senate commissioned Gnaeus Papirius Carbo, one of the consuls, to lead a substantial Roman army to Noricum to force the barbarians out. An engagement, later called the Battle of Noreia, took place, in which the invaders, to everyone's surprise, completely overwhelmed the Legions and inflicted a devastating loss on Carbo and his men.

After the Noreia victory, the Cimbri and Teutons moved westward towards Gaul. A few years later, in 109 BC, they moved along the River Rhodanus (now called the Rhône) towards the Roman province in Transalpine Gaul. Another consul, Marcus Junius Silanus, was sent to take care of the renewed Germanic threat. Silanus marched his army north along the Rhodanus River in order to confront the migrating Germanic tribes. He met the Cimbri approximately 100 miles north of Arausio, a battle was fought and the Romans suffered another humiliating defeat. The Germanic tribes then moved to the lands north and east of Tolosa in south-western Gaul.

To the Romans, the presence of the Germanic tribes in Gaul posed a serious threat to the stability in the area and to their prestige. Lucius Cassius Longinus, one of the consuls of 107, was sent to Gaul at the head of another large army. He first fought the Cimbri and their Gallic allies the Volcae Tectosages just outside Tolosa, and despite the huge number of tribesmen, the Romans routed them. Unfortunately for the Romans, a few days later they were ambushed while marching on Burdigala. The Battle of Burdigala destroyed the Romans hope of finishing off the Cimbri and the Germanic threat continued to exist.

In 106 the Romans sent their largest army yet; the senior consul of 106, Quintus Servilius Caepio, was authorized to use eight legions in an effort to end the Germanic threat once and for all. While the Romans were busy getting their army together the Volcae Tectosages had quarrelled with their Germanic guests, and had asked them to leave the area. When Caepio arrived he only found the local tribes and they sensibly decided not to fight the newly arrived legions. Caepio's command was prorogued in 105 and a further six legions were raised in Rome by Gnaeus Mallius Maximus, one of the consuls of 105, he led them to reinforce Caepio who was near Arausio. Unfortunately for the Romans, Caepio who was a patrician and Mallius Maximus who was a 'new man' did not get along. Caepio refused to take orders from Mallius Maximus who as consul outranked him. All this led to a divided Roman force with the two armies so far apart they could not support each other when the fighting started. Meanwhile, the Germanic tribes had combined their forces. The Cimbri, at the Battle of Arausio, overwhelmed and overran Caepio's legions with massively overwhelming numbers. Caepio's routed men crashed into Mallius's troops, which led to both armies being pinned against the River Rhône and annihilated by the numerically dominant Cimbrian warriors. The battle was considered the greatest Roman defeat since the slaughter suffered at the battle of Cannae during the Punic Wars.

In 104 BC, the Cimbri and the Teutons seemed to be heading for Italy. The Romans sent the senior consul of 104, Gaius Marius, a proven and capable general just returned in victory from the Jugurthine War, at the head of another large army. The Germanic tribes never materialized, having marched west into Hispania, so Marius subdued the Volcae Tectosages capturing their king Copillus. Marius was tasked with rebuilding, effectively from scratch, the Gallic legions. Basing his army around a core of trained legionaries from the last year, Marius again secured exemption from the property requirements and with his newly-minted reputation for glorious and profitable victory, raised an army of some thirty thousand Romans and forty thousand Italian allies and auxiliaries. He established a base around the town of Aquae Sextiae and trained his men.

In 103, Sulla, one of Marius's lieutenants, succeeded in persuading the Germanic Marsi tribe to become friends and allies of Rome; they detached themselves from the Germanic confederation and went back to Germania. In 102 BC the Teutons and Ambrones moved into Gallia Transalpina (the Roman province in the south of Gaul) while the Cimbri moved into Italy. Marius, as senior consul (consul prior), ordered his junior partner Quintus Lutatius Catulus (the consul posterior) to keep the Cimbri out of Italy, which Marius may have expected to have been little more than garrison duty – while he marched against the Teutons and Ambrones.

== Prelude ==
The Teutons and Ambrones, led by King Teutobod, had crossed the Durance river, east of where it entered the Rhône. The Teutons made up the bulk of the invading force, with the Ambrones the second most numerous tribe in the coalition under Teutobod. Gaius Marius and his army had arrived some time earlier. Marius had used his time wisely; he had constructed a heavily fortified camp on a hill close to the river and stocked it with enough supplies to withstand a lengthy siege. The tribesmen tried to get the Romans to come out of their fort and fight; they shouted insults and challenges, which Marius ignored. He was unwilling to give up a strongly defended position for a battle with an uncertain outcome. Marius let it be known throughout his camp that he intended to fight the barbarians, but on his terms, not theirs. The catcalls and challenges continued.

A Teuton warrior even issued a challenge directly to Marius. The barbarian invited the general to join him in single combat. Marius mocked him by advising him that if the warrior desired death he should find a rope, fashion a noose and hang himself. The Teuton did not give up so Marius produced a veteran gladiator and explained to the barbarian that if he still lusted for blood he could try and slay the trained fighter for it was beneath Marius's station as a consul to reduce himself to a common brawler.

After they failed to lure the Romans, they tried to wait them out, but Marius had anticipated this and his fortress was well stocked. Frustrated the tribesmen attacked the fort for three days. Assault after assault was launched at the Roman defense works, but the fortifications held and from these the Romans released a barrage of missiles, killing many barbarians and repulsing the rest. Still the Romans did not come out and the tribal coalition decided to move on south toward Massilia, which they intended to plunder. It took several days for their entire wagon train to clear the area but, once they were out of sight, Gaius Marius followed, dogging them and waiting for an opportune moment to strike.

As the Romans trailed the tribal coalition, after each day's march Marius ordered his men to build a fortified camp with impressive defense works. After all the losses they suffered trying to take Marius's fortress on the Rhone, the Teutons and Ambrones never tried to storm Marius's camp again. Marius was biding his time waiting for the barbarians to make a mistake. He was presented with a chance to take on part of the tribal horde when they entered the area of Aquae Sextiae.

== Battle ==
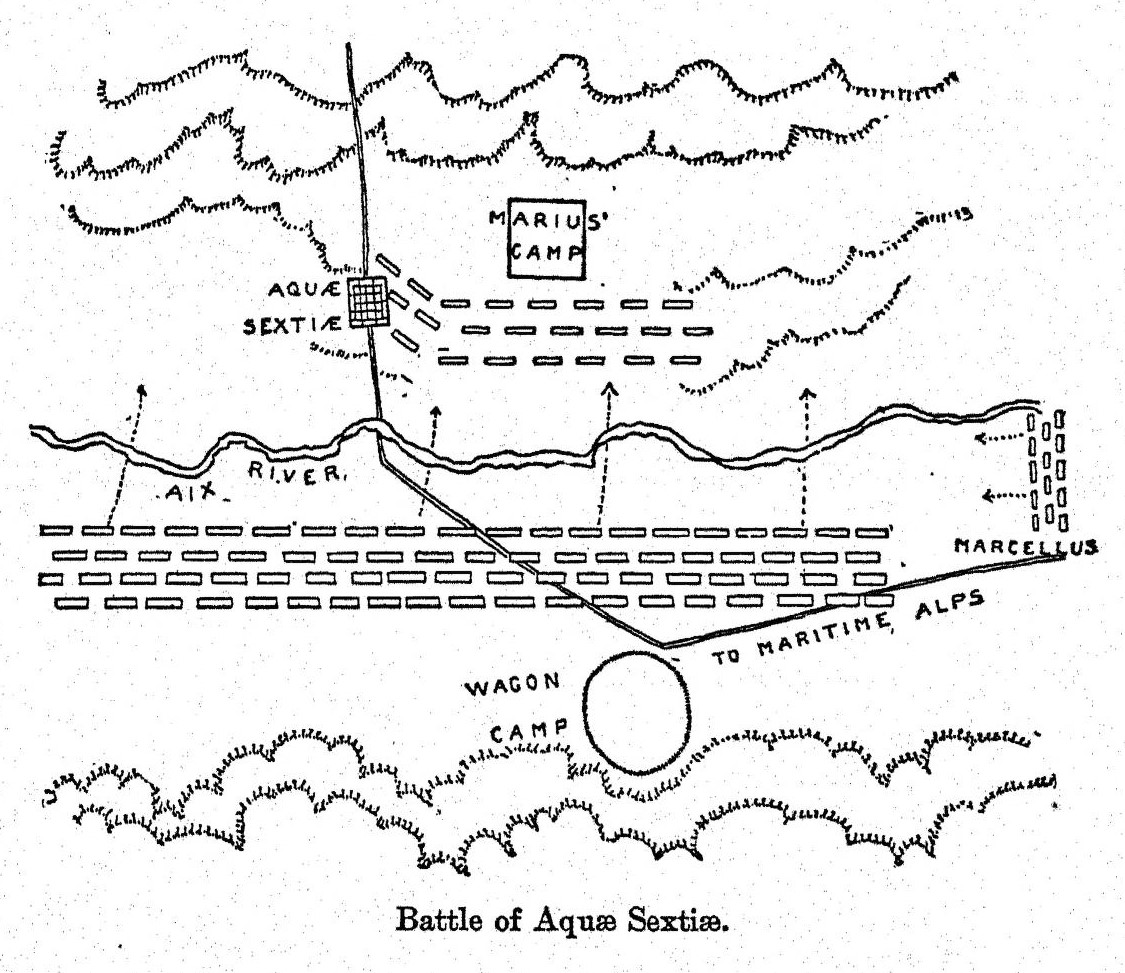
Plan of the battle of Aquae Sextiae (Caesarː A History Of The Art Of War Among The Romans Down To The End, 1892).

Several days after crossing the Rhone, Marius's army camped near the Ambrones, who for some reason had decided to camp separately from their Teutonic allies, when a couple of army servants, fetching water from the river, ran into an unknown number of Ambrones bathing in the river. The bathing Ambrones, caught by surprise, called for their fellow tribesmen who were eating dinner and drinking in their camp on their side of the river. The Romans, working on their camp, heard the commotion and quickly grasped the situation. Marius's Ligurian auxiliaries, without orders from Marius, dropped their tools, took up their weapons and sprinted to their servants' aid. The Ambrones now formed a battle line and awaited the Ligurians. Many tribesmen were weighed down by food, half-naked from bathing or intoxicated.

After forming their battle lines, the Ambrones started beating their swords and spears against their shields and chanting their battle cry: 'Ambrones!'. The Ligurians who were charging towards them had once been called Ambrones as well and also started to shout 'Ambrones!'. After reaching the Ambrones, the Ligurians also formed battle lines. They continued their shouting match for a while and then the battle finally ensued. While these events were taking place, Marius had formed up his legions and marched to reinforce his Ligurian auxiliaries. When the legionaries arrived at the battle, they cast their pila (the Roman throwing spear) into the Ambrones, killing several warriors or rendering their shields useless, unsheathed their gladius (the Roman short sword) and waded in. After the legions' arrival, the battle quickly turned into a rout. Marius's heavily armed, expertly trained soldiers easily overpowered the Ambrones and pushed them toward the river. The Ambrones suffered terrible losses while on the Roman side losses were very low.

Marius did not allow a victory celebration, because he knew the Teutons were still in the field and feared a counter-attack. By the time the fighting ended, it was too late in the day to finish their fortified camp, leaving the Romans vulnerable. Marius sent a detachment of troops into the woods to create a great noise to disorientate the barbarians and keep them from sleeping. This would also cause his enemies to be sluggish because of lack of sleep the next day. However, the night and the succeeding few days passed without incident, much to Marius' relief.

While waiting, Marius sent one of his legates, Claudius Marcellus, with 3,000 troops some distance away and ordered him to remain undetected until a determined time when he would appear at the enemy rear.

Since the Teutons were waiting for him on the plain near Aquae Sextiae, Marius had the opportunity to reconnoiter the area and select a suitable site for the upcoming battle. Four days after slaughtering the Ambrones, Marius marched his army onto the plain and took position on the high ground. He instructed his legionaries to stand their ground on the hill, launch javelins, draw their swords, guard themselves with their shields and thrust the enemy back. He assured his men that, since the barbarians would be charging uphill, their footing would be unsure and they would be vulnerable.

Marius ordered his camp servants and all other non-combatants to march with the army. He also ordered his beasts of burden to be fashioned as cavalry horses. All of this was to create the illusion his forces were larger than they really were. He wanted the barbarians to hold back more of their warriors in reserve so his real forces would not be overwhelmed by the tribesmen's numbers.

The surviving Ambrones and the Teutons, bent on revenge, eagerly awaited the upcoming confrontation and, when the Romans finally showed themselves on the Aquae Sextiae plain, charged uphill. The Romans unleashed a barrage of javelins, killing or maiming many tribesmen, then stood in close order, drew their swords and awaited the enemy at the top of the hill. Roman strategy, discipline and training asserted itself and the tribesmen were unable to dislodge the legions from their superior position. The battle continued for much of the morning, with neither side gaining the upper hand. However, the well-conditioned and disciplined legionaries slowly and systematically forced the tribal horde down the hill until both the Romans and barbarians were on level ground.

This was when Claudius Marcellus and his 3,000 men loudly and viciously attacked the enemy rear. The Ambrones and Teutons were now being attacked on two fronts and confusion set in. They broke ranks and started to flee, but most failed to escape. Modern research suggests that "one important explanation for the one-sidedness of the slaughter was the sheer crowding together of the encircled troops, making them an easy target and preventing them from fighting [effectively]". Those who did escape were pursued relentlessly. By the end of the afternoon, most of the barbarian warriors were dead or captured. Teutobod, the Teutonic king, and his warriors escaped the battle only to be caught by the Sequani, who handed them over to Marius.

Marius sent Manius Aquillius with a report to Rome. It said that 37,000 superbly trained Romans had succeeded in defeating Teutons in two engagements.

== Aftermath ==
There were surviving warriors, women and children who were to be sold into slavery. Roman historians recorded that 300 of the captured women committed mass suicide, which passed into Roman legends of Germanic heroism:

By the conditions of the surrender three hundred of their married women were to be handed over to the Romans. When the Teuton matrons heard of this stipulation they first begged the consul that they might be set apart to minister in the temples of Ceres and Venus; and then when they failed to obtain their request and were removed by the lictors, they slew their little children and next morning were all found dead in each other's arms having strangled themselves in the night.

The proceeds from the sale of slaves usually went to the commanding General, but in this case, Marius decided to donate the profits from the sale to his soldiers and officers. This, of course, made him even more popular than he already was with his men.

Upon hearing the news, Rome went wild with relief. Finally one of their generals had defeated the Germans. Gaius Marius, as an act of gratitude, was again elected consul in absentia, with his legate Manius Aquillius as his colleague. The Senate also voted for a three-day thanksgiving; the people voted him two days more.

The following year, in July 101 BC, Marius and the proconsul Quintus Lutatius Catulus defeated the Cimbri at the battle of Vercellae, ending the German threat.

The inhabitants of Massalia, some 23 Roman miles, 30 kilometres, distant, used the bones of the fallen tribesmen to erect fences to protect their crops. The decaying corpses left the soil enriched, and for years thereafter the region experienced extraordinary harvests largely thanks to thousands of rotting bodies fertilizing the farmers' lands.

== In fiction ==
- Colleen McCullough describes the battle in her novel The First Man in Rome, the first book in her Masters of Rome series.
