= Furor Teutonicus =

Latin phrase

Furor Teutonicus ('Teutonic Fury') is a Latin phrase referring to the proverbial ferocity of the Teutons, or more generally, of the Germanic tribes of the Roman Empire period.

Generally, the original expression is attributed to the Roman poet Lucan (d. AD 65). It occurs for the first time in his work, De Bello Civili. Lucan used the term to describe what he believed to be the outstanding characteristic of the Celtic/Germanic tribes called the Teutones: a mad, merciless, berserk rage in battle.

The Teutons met with the armies of the Roman Republic in the Eastern Alps around 113 BC. Under the command of the consul Gnaeus Papirius Carbo, the Romans tried to lure the tribe into a trap, but the Romans underestimated their military potential and lost the Battle of Noreia. The Romans also lost the Battle of Arausio (105 BC) and other lesser battles, before putting Gaius Marius in charge of their defence. Ultimately, the Teutons were defeated in 102 BC.

== See also ==
- Berserker
- Germanic wars
- Gothic and Vandal warfare
- Harii
- Migration period
- Prussian virtues
- Theodiscus
