= Caesorix =

Cimbri leader

Caesorix was a co-leader of the Cimbri tribe during the Cimbrian War, in which the Cimbri won a spectacular victory against the Romans at the Battle of Arausio in 105 BC. He was captured along with Claodicus at the Battle of Vercellae in 101 BC. The other Cimbrian chiefs Boiorix and Lugius were killed on the field.
