= Lugius =

Cimbri leader

Lugius was a co-leader of the Cimbri tribe during the Cimbrian War, in which the Cimbri won a spectacular victory against the Romans at the Battle of Arausio in 105 BC. He was later defeated and slain along with Boiorix at the Battle of Vercellae in 101 BC. The other Cimbrian chiefs Claodicus and Caesorix were captured.
