= The Defeat of the Cimbri =

Painting by Alexandre-Gabriel Decamps

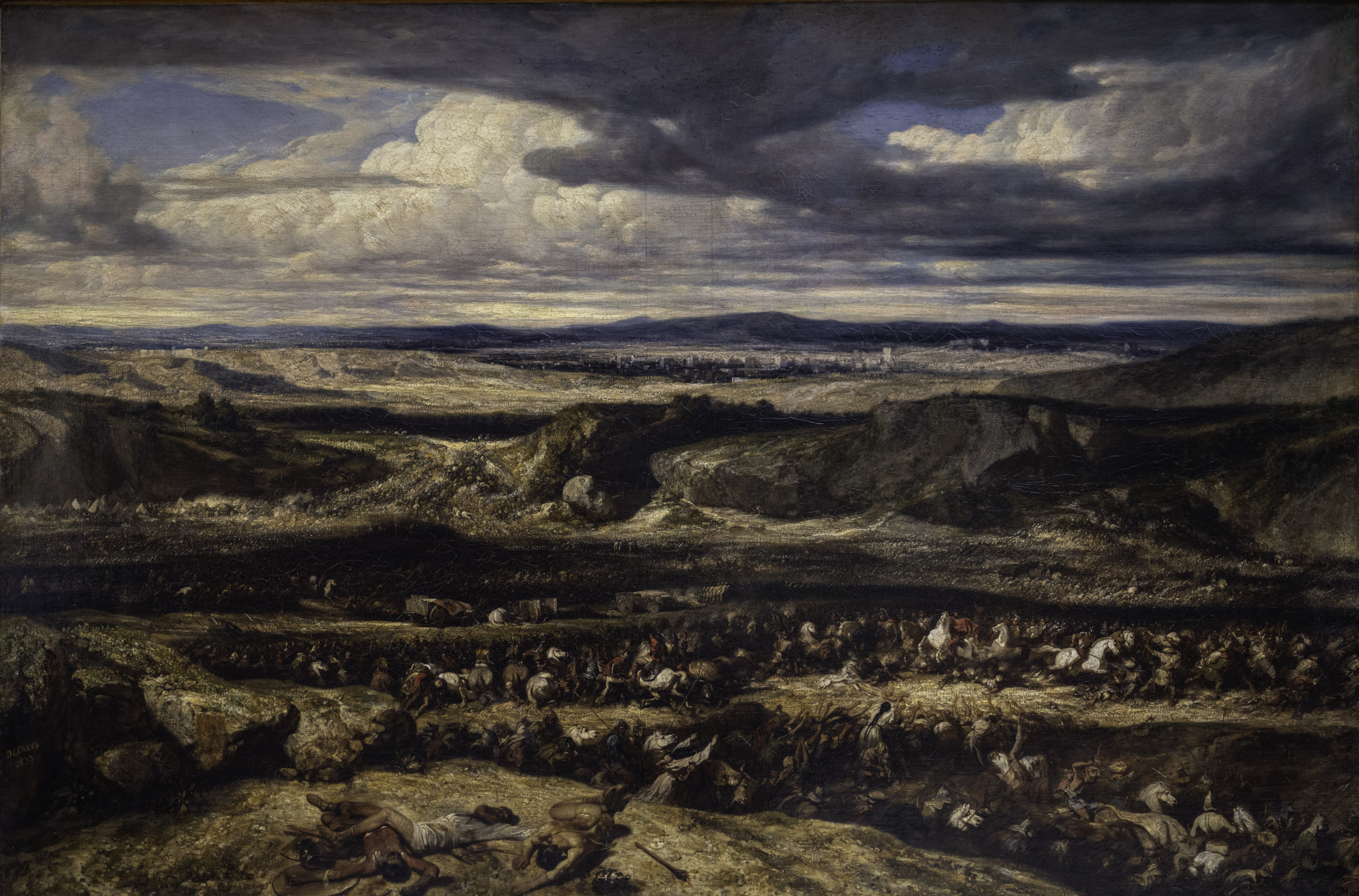
- Artist: Alexandre-Gabriel Decamps
- Year: 1833
- Type: Oil on canvas, history painting
- Dimensions: 130 cm × 195 cm (51 in × 77 in)
- Location: Louvre; Paris

The Defeat of the Cimbri (French: La défaite des Cimbre) is an 1833 history painting by the French artist Alexandre-Gabriel Decamps. It depicts a scene from 102 BC during the Cimbrian War where forces of the Roman Republic led by Gaius Marius defeated the Germanic tribes from the Cimbri and Teutons. This victory, fought in the valley of Aix-en-Provence, was crucial in turning the tide of the war in which an attack on Rome itself seemed likely.

Decamps was a noted figure of the Romantic movement. The painting was displayed at the Salon of 1834 held at the Louvre in Paris. It was exhibited again at the Salon of 1855. The painting at one point belonged to the Duke of Orléans and was sold by his widow in 1853. It formally came into the possession of the French state in 1903 and is now part of the collection of the Louvre.

== Bibliography ==
- Boime, Albert. The Art of the Macchia and the Risorgimento: Representing Culture and Nationalism in Nineteenth-Century Italy. University of Chicago Press, 1993.
- Marwil, Jonathan. Visiting Modern War in Risorgimento Italy. Palgrave Macmillan, 2010.
- Novotny, Fritz. Painting and Sculpture in Europe 1780-1880. Yale University Press, 1995.
