= Cimbrian War =

Conflict between Rome and Germanic & Celtic tribes (113–101 BCE)

- Part of the Roman–Germanic Wars
- Supposed migrations of the Cimbri and the Teutons: Roman victories Cimbri-Teutonic victories
Date	6 October 113–101 BC (12 years)
Location	Central, Southern and Western Europe, Noricum and Gaul
Result	Roman victory

Belligerents
Roman Republic; Celtiberians	Cimbri; Teutons; Ambrones; Tigurini

Commanders and leaders
Gaius Marius; Quintus Lutatius Catulus; Quintus Servilius Caepio; Gnaeus Mallius Maximus; Gnaeus Papirius Carbo; Lucius Cassius Longinus †; Lucius Calpurnius Piso †; Marcus Junius Silanus	Boiorix †; Lugius †; Claodicus (surrendered); Caesorix (surrendered); Divico; Teutobod (surrendered)

The Cimbrian or Cimbric War (113–101 BC) was fought between the Roman Republic and the Germanic and Celtic tribes of the Cimbri and the Teutons, Ambrones and Tigurini, who migrated from the Jutland peninsula into Roman-controlled territory, and clashed with Rome and her allies. The Cimbrian War was the first time since the Second Punic War that Italia and Rome itself had been seriously threatened. It was the first of many confrontations with Germanic tribes in Roman history that would last for centuries.

The war had a great effect on the internal politics and military organization of Rome. The war contributed greatly to the political career of Gaius Marius, whose consulships and political conflicts challenged many of the Roman Republic's political institutions and customs of the time. The Cimbrian threat, along with the Jugurthine War, allegedly inspired the putative Marian reforms of the Roman legions, a view now contested by modern historians.

Rome was finally victorious, and its Germanic adversaries, who had inflicted on the Roman armies the heaviest losses that they had suffered since the Second Punic War, with victories at the battles of Arausio and Noreia, were left almost completely annihilated after Roman victories at Aquae Sextiae and Vercellae. Some of the surviving captives are reported to have been among the rebelling gladiators during the Third Servile War.

== Migrations and conflicts ==
According to some Roman accounts, sometime around 120–115 BC, the Cimbri left their original lands around the North Sea due to flooding, known as the Cymbrian flood (Strabo, on the other hand, wrote that this was unlikely or impossible). They supposedly journeyed to the south-east and were soon joined by their neighbours and possible relatives the Teutones. Together they defeated the Scordisci, along with the Boii, many of whom apparently joined them. In 113 BC they arrived on the Danube, in Noricum, home to the Roman-allied Taurisci. Unable to hold back these new, powerful invaders on their own, the Taurisci called on Rome for aid.

== Initial Roman defeats ==
The following year the Roman consul Gnaeus Papirius Carbo led the legions into Noricum, and after making a show of force, took up a strong defensive position and demanded that the Cimbri and their allies leave the province immediately. The Cimbri initially set about complying peacefully with Rome's demands, but soon discovered that Carbo had laid an ambush against them. Infuriated by this treachery, they attacked and, at the Battle of Noreia, annihilated Carbo's army, almost killing Carbo in the process.

Italy was now open to invasion, yet for some reason, the Cimbri and their allies moved west over the Alps and into Gaul. In 109 BC, they invaded the Roman province of Gallia Narbonensis and defeated the Roman army there under Marcus Junius Silanus. In 107 BC, the Romans were defeated again, this time by the Tigurini, who were allies of the Cimbri whom they had met on their way through the Alps. That same year, they defeated another Roman army at the Battle of Burdigala (modern day Bordeaux) and killed its commander, the consul Lucius Cassius Longinus Ravalla.

== Disaster at Arausio ==
In 105 BC, Rome and its new consul Gnaeus Mallius Maximus and the proconsul Quintus Servilius Caepio, in order to settle the matter once and for all, gathered the largest force it had fielded since the Second Punic War, and possibly the largest force it had ever sent to battle. The force consisted of over 80,000 men, along with tens of thousands of support personnel and camp followers in two armies, one led by each consul.

The consuls led their armies on their own armed migration to the Rhône River near Orange, Vaucluse, where, disliking and distrusting each other, they erected separate camps on opposite sides of the river; by so doing they left their disunited force open to separate attack. The overconfident Caepio foolishly attacked without support from Maximus; his legions were wiped out and his undefended camp overrun. The now isolated and demoralized troops of Maximus were then easily defeated. Thousands more were slain trying desperately to rally and defend his poorly positioned camp. Only Caepio, Maximus, and a few hundred Romans escaped with their lives across the carnage-choked river. The Battle of Arausio was the costliest defeat Rome had suffered since Cannae and, in fact, the losses and long-term consequences were far greater. For the Cimbri and Teutones it was a great (though temporary) triumph.

Instead of immediately gathering their allies and marching on Rome, the Cimbri proceeded to Hispania. There, they suffered their first defeat, not at the hands of a Roman army, but against a Celtiberian coalition. In the meantime, the Teutones remained in Gaul. Why they again failed to invade Italy remains a mystery. Theodor Mommsen speculatively describes their methods of war:

Their system of warfare was substantially that of the Celts of this period, who no longer fought, as the Italian Celts had formerly done, bareheaded and with merely sword and dagger, but with copper helmets often richly adorned and with a peculiar missile weapon, the materis; the large sword was retained and the long narrow shield, along with which they probably wore also a coat of mail. They were not destitute of cavalry; but the Romans were superior to them in that arm. Their order of battle was as formerly a rude phalanx professedly drawn up with just as many ranks in depth as in breadth, the first rank of which in dangerous combats not unfrequently tied together their metallic girdles with cords.

== Marius takes command ==
Following the devastation of the Arausio, fear shook the Roman Republic to its foundations. The terror cimbricus became a watchword, as Rome expected the Cimbri at its gates at any time. In this atmosphere of panic and desperation, an emergency was declared. The constitution was ignored and Gaius Marius, the victor over Jugurtha of Numidia was elected consul for an unprecedented, and arguably illegal, five years in a row, starting in 104 BC. Because of the destruction of the Roman force at Arausio and the pressure of the impending crisis, Marius was tasked with rebuilding, effectively from scratch, the Gallic legions. Building his army around a core of trained legionaries from the last year, Marius again secured exemption from the property requirements and with his newly minted reputation for victory, raised an army of some thirty thousand Romans and forty thousand Italian allies and auxiliaries. He established a base around the town of Aquae Sextiae (modern Aix-en-Provence) and trained his men. Over his successive consulships, Marius was not idle. He trained his troops, built his intelligence network, and conducted diplomacy with the Gallic tribes on the provincial frontiers.

While the panicked Senate and people of Rome gave Marius the power he needed to build his army, the failure of the Cimbri and Teutones to follow up on their victory gave him the time he needed to finish it. They would soon be confronted by an army of organized and trained soldiers under the leadership of an experienced commander.

== Turning point ==
By 102 BC, Marius was ready to face the Cimbri; the latter, after difficulties in Spain, had turned north into Gaul, where they were joined by the Teutons. After this union, the Germanic coalition determined to move back south upon Italy, which they had previously avoided. Marching south through Switzerland and Savoy, their army was augmented by some tribes of Helvetians, particularly the Tigurini, and the Ambrones of uncertain descent. Before approaching Italy, the Germans decided on a two-pronged movement; the Teutons with the Ambrones and the Tigurini would move from the west along the coast-road from Transalpine into Cisalpine Gaul; while the Cimbri would march east and turn around into Italy by the Julian and Carnic Alps. When Marius heard of their movements, he advanced to Valence, and established his camp at the confluence of the Isère and the Rhône, where he could observe and halt the march of the Teutons. When the Teutons arrived, they attempted to force him into battle, but he declined; they attacked the Roman camp, but were beaten off. Impatient of the delay and of Marius' passivity, they finally decided to simply march past him into Italy. So enormous were their numbers, that they reportedly took 6 whole days marching by his camp, and in their arrogance they taunted the Romans, what message they wished them to give to their wives? Marius followed cautiously, maintaining distance from the enemy, but closely following his movements. A few days later, a skirmish turned into a battle with the Ambrones, who for some reason camped separately from the Teutones. The Ambrones were defeated with heavy losses and fled to their Teutonic allies. The Teutones halted their trek south and awaited Marius near Aquae Sextiae. This afforded Marius favorable conditions, for with his enemy stationary he got to scout the battlegrounds and he chose his ground carefully. In the subsequent battle, he lured the Teutones and their allies into attacking him while his army was occupying the high ground. During their attack they were ambushed from the rear by a select force of five cohorts which Marius had hidden in a nearby wood. The Teutones were routed and massacred and their king, Teutobod, was placed in Roman chains. But Aquae Sextiae had only evened the score: while the Teutones had been eliminated, the Cimbri remained a formidable threat.

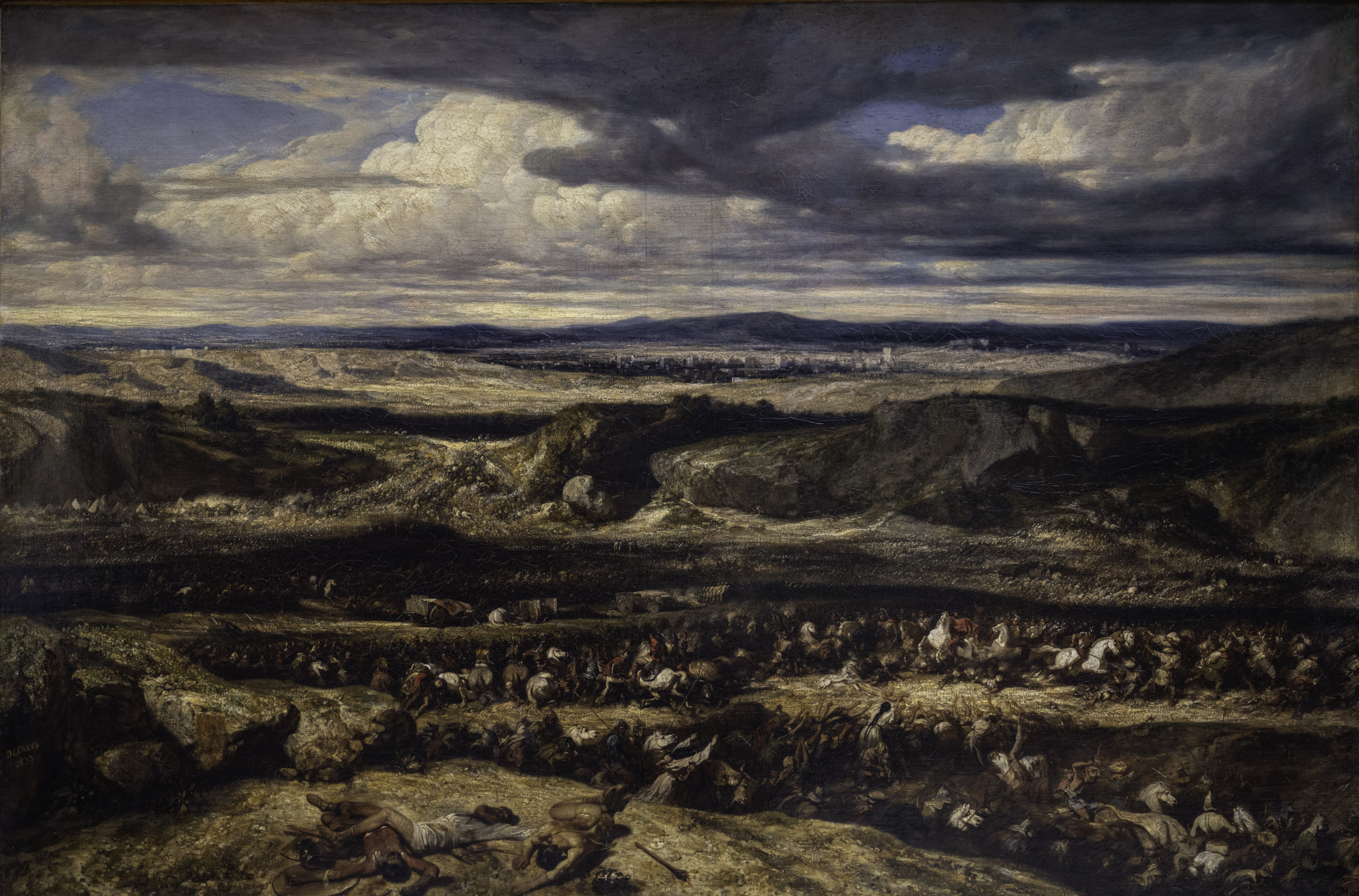
The Defeat of the Cimbri, by Alexandre Gabriel Décamps, 1833

In 101 BC, the Cimbri returned to Gaul and prepared for the final stage of their struggle with Rome. For the first time they penetrated through the Alpine passes, which Marius's co-consul for that year, Quintus Lutatius Catulus, had failed to fortify, into northern Italy. Catulus withdrew behind the Po River, leaving the countryside open to the invaders. But the Cimbri took their time ravishing the fertile region, which gave Marius time to arrive with reinforcements—his same victorious legions from Aquae Sextiae. It would be at Vercellae near the confluence of the Sesia River with the Po on the Raudine Plain where the superiority of the new Roman legions and their cavalry were clearly demonstrated. In the devastating defeat the Cimbri were virtually annihilated, and both their highest leaders, Boiorix and Lugius, fell. The women killed both themselves and their children in order to avoid slavery. Thus the war, which began with a mass migration, ended in defeat and mass suicide.

== Aftermath ==
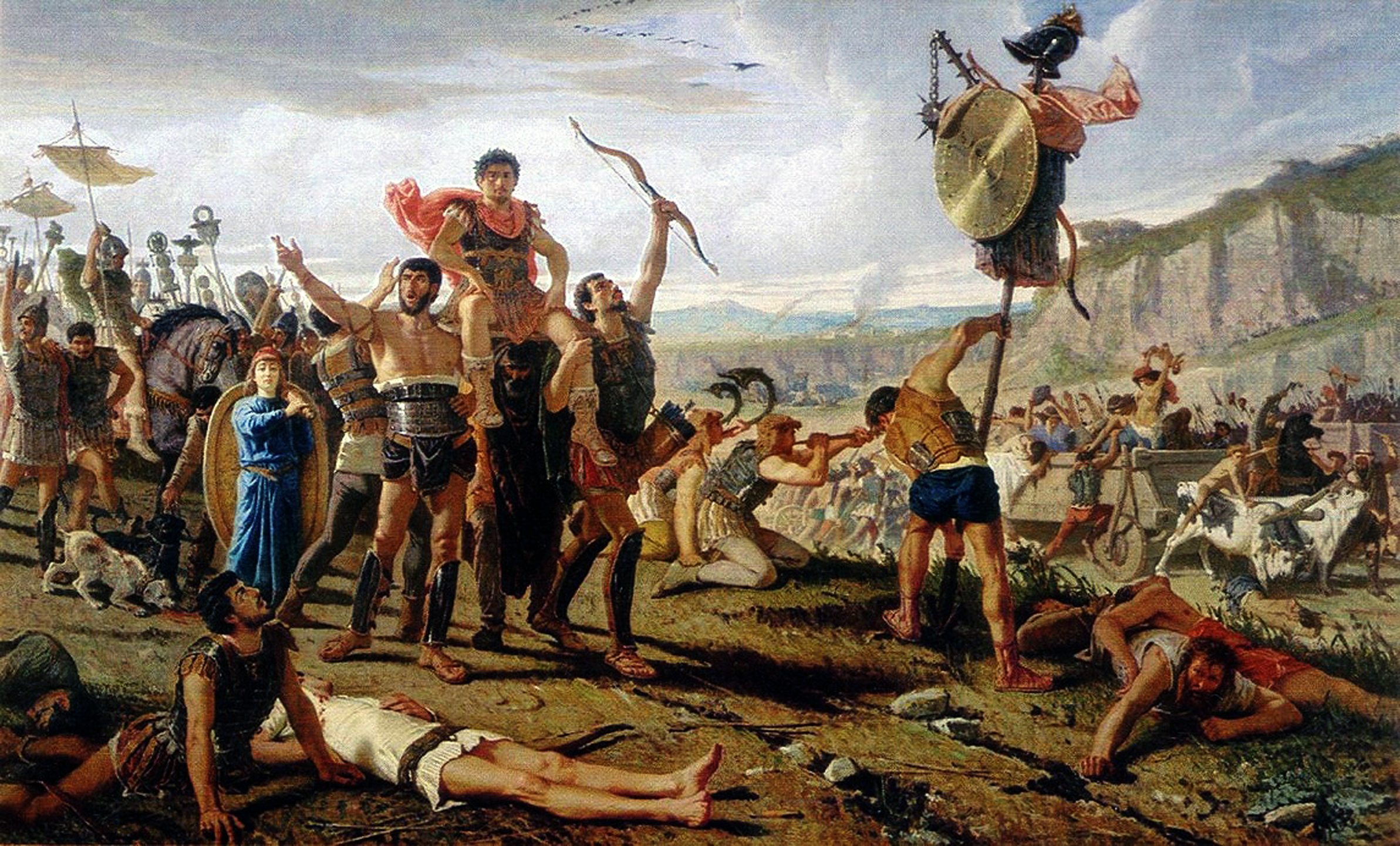
Marius as victor over the invading Cimbri

The Cimbri were not completely wiped off the face of the map or from the pages of history. Their allies, the Boii, with whom they intermixed, settled in southern Gaul and Germania and were there to welcome and confront Julius Caesar, Marius's nephew, in his campaigns of conquest. Some of the surviving captives are reported to have been among the rebelling gladiators in the Third Servile War.

The political consequences from the war had an immediate and lasting impact on Rome. The end of the Cimbrian war marked the beginning of the rivalry between Marius and Sulla, which eventually led to the first of Rome's great civil wars. Moreover, following the final victory at Vercellae, and without first asking permission from the Senate, Marius granted Roman citizenship to two cohorts of his Italian allied soldiers (around a thousand soldiers, within an army counting about 32 000 men, half of which were Italian allies), allegedly claiming that in the din of battle he could not distinguish between the voices of Romans and the Italic allies.

According to traditional historiography, henceforth Italian legions became Roman legions and the allied cities of the Italian peninsula progressively began to demand a greater say in the external policy of the Republic, leading eventually to the Social War.
