= The First Man in Rome =

1990 novel by Colleen McCullough

- First US edition
- Author: Colleen McCullough
- Language: English
- Series: Masters of Rome
- Genre: Historical fiction
- Publisher: William Morrow (US); Century (UK)
- Publication date: 1990
- Publication place: Australia
- Media type: Print (hardback and paperback)
- Pages: 896
- ISBN: 0-688-09368-X
- Followed by: The Grass Crown

The First Man in Rome is a 1990 historical novel by Australian author Colleen McCullough, and the first in her Masters of Rome series.

The cast of the novel includes most of the major historical figures of the late Roman Republic, including Gaius Marius and Lucius Cornelius Sulla, as well as the Gaius Julius Caesar who was grandfather of Julius Caesar, Julia, Marcus Aemilius Scaurus, Quintus Caecilius Metellus Numidicus, Publius Rutilius Rufus and Lucius Appuleius Saturninus.

== Plot summary ==
The main plot of the novel is generally concerned with the rise of Marius, his marriage to Julia, his success in replacing Metellus as general in charge of the Numidian theatre of war, his defeat of King Jugurtha of Numidia, his re-organization of the Roman Army system, his unprecedented consecutive consulships, his defeat of a massive invasion of German tribes (the Teutones, the Cimbri and the Marcomanni/Cherusci/Tigurini), and the details of his relationship with his subordinate and close friend Sulla.

However, although Marius can be considered the protagonist, Sulla occasionally becomes the central figure of the narrative; there are several lengthy sections dealing with his plot to murder the two wealthy women with whom he lives, his use of the newfound wealth in establishing himself politically, his homosexual relationship with the Greek child-actor Metrobius, and his marriage to the (fictitious) younger daughter of 'Julius Caesar Grandfather', Julilla. McCullough explains that, while it is certainly known Sulla's first wife was a Julia, it is not known to which branch of the Julii she belonged, but she was certainly a relation of Marius's better-known Julian wife, hence the decision to assign her the role in the novel of a younger sister.

A third storyline is focused on the figures of Marcus Livius Drusus and his sister Livia Drusa who both feature more prominently in The Grass Crown: and their own growing friendship with the Servilius Caepio family resulting in a double marriage, which proves disastrous when Quintus Servilius Caepio Senior is not only accused of embezzling more gold than there was in the Roman Treasury, but also is responsible for Rome's most disastrous military defeat for generations – a defeat which so ruins the credibility of the conservative leaders of the Senate that it lets Marius into power far earlier than he expected, and for a longer time.

Much of the narrative is also told in the form of letters between the protagonists – Marius, Sulla, Old Caesar and frequently their friend, Publius Rutilius Rufus – himself a man somewhat torn in allegiance: conservative by instinct, but partisan of Marius by friendship.

The novel closes with Marius's sixth consulship, in which he proves not to be as adept politically as he is militarily: and the tribune whose help he needs, Lucius Appuleius Saturninus, has an agenda of his own, leading to an armed insurrection which Marius himself has to put down. To cap it all, he also suffers a minor stroke during the summer, although he makes a full recovery. Tarred by association, his political career seems over: but after fighting many battles together, there is some reason for Marius and Sulla to hope that Rome will have peace for a few years.

== Critical reception ==
Writing for the Dayton Daily News reviewer Mary Sikora noted: "It's thick and sometimes plodding, but Colleen McCullough has come through with a good one again with The First Man in Rome."

In Publishers Weekly the critic found: "Evoking with impeccably researched, meticulous detail the political and social fabric of Rome in the last days of the Republic, McCullough demonstrates a thoroughgoing understanding of an age in which birth and blood lines determine one's fate, and the auctoritas and dignitas of the Roman family mean more than any personal relationship...As usual, McCullough tells a good story, describing political intrigue, social infighting and bloody battles with authoritative skill, interpolating domestic drama and even a soupcon of romance."

== Publication history ==
After the novel's initial publication by William Morrow in US and Century in the UK in 1990, it was reprinted as follows:

- Guild Press, UK, 1990
- Arrow Books, UK, 1990, 1991
- Avon Books, USA, 1991, 2008
- Head of Zeus, UK, 2013

The novel was also translated into French, Italian, and German in 1990, Spanish, Dutch, Swedish and Hungarian in 1991, Russian in 1993, Polish in 1999, Portuguese in 2000, Serbian in 2003, and Lithuanian in 2010.
