= Ambisagrus =

Gaulish god identified with Jupiter

In Gallo-Roman religion, Ambisagrus was a Gaulish god worshipped at Aquileia in Cisalpine Gaul, where he was identified with Jupiter Optimus Maximus.

The name may be composed of the Proto-Celtic prefix *ambi- ('around') and root *sagro-.
