= Gnaeus Papirius Carbo (consul 113 BC) =

Roman senator and general

Gnaeus Papirius Carbo was a Roman military general and politician in 113 BC, together with Gaius Caecilius Metellus Caprarius.

== Life ==
He was according to Cicero (ad Fam. ix. 21) the father of the Carbo of the same name, who was thrice consul, whereas this latter is called by Velleius Paterculus (II 26) a brother of Gaius Papirius Carbo Arvina. This difficulty may be solved by supposing that the word frater in Velleius is equivalent to frater patruelis or cousin. (Perizon., Animadv. Hist. p. 96.) His brother, Gaius Papirius Carbo, consul in 120 BC, had been an ally of the Gracchi brothers, deserting their cause after their deaths, only to commit suicide in 119 BC after being prosecuted by the young and rising orator Lucius Licinius Crassus.

During his consulship, he was ordered by the Senate to take legions to defend the Alps from the migration of the Cimbri. There, he shadowed the Germanic tribe and ambushed them near Noreia. At the ensuing Battle of Noreia, although Carbo held the advantage in terrain and surprise, his forces were overwhelmed by the sheer magnitude of Cimbrian warriors, and disastrously defeated. The Cimbri, while smashing the Roman army, did not advance into Italy, seemingly looking for some place to settle.

He was afterwards accused by Marcus Antonius for provoking and then losing the Battle of Noreia. Securing a conviction, Carbo committed suicide to redeem his pride and honour rather than depart for exile, taking a solution of vitriol (atramentum sutorium, Cic., ad Fam. IX 21; Liv., Epit. 63.).

== Sources ==
- Duncan, Mike (2017). The Storm before the Storm. New York: PublicAffairs. ISBN 978-1-5417-2403-7. Details a broad narrative history of history from the death of the Gracchi brothers to the dictatorship of Sulla.

Political offices
Preceded by Manius Acilius Balbus; Gaius Porcius Cato	Roman consul 113 BC; With: Gaius Caecilius Metellus Caprarius	Succeeded by Marcus Livius Drusus; L. Calpurnius Piso Caesoninus
