= Battle of Arausio =

Battle during the Cimbrian War (105 BC)

- Part of the Cimbrian War and the Roman–Germanic Wars
- The migrations of the Cimbri and the Teutons. Roman victories Cimbri-Teutonic victories
Date	6 October 105 BC
Location	Arausio, on the Rhône River, France 44°08′00″N 4°48′00″E
Result	Cimbri-Teutonic victory

Belligerents
Cimbri; Teutons	Roman Republic

Commanders and leaders
Boiorix; Teutobod	Quintus Servilius Caepio; Gnaeus Mallius Maximus

Strength
200,000	120,000: 80,000 troops (10–12 legions); 40,000 auxiliaries and camp followers

Casualties and losses
15,000 killed	80,000 39,990 camp followers killed
- Location within France Battle of Arausio (Europe)

The Battle of Arausio took place on 6 October 105 BC, at a site between the town of Arausio, now Orange, Vaucluse, and the Rhône river, when two Roman armies, commanded by proconsul Quintus Servilius Caepio and consul Gnaeus Mallius Maximus, suffered a major defeat at the hands of the Cimbri and Teuton migratory tribes who were led by Boiorix and Teutobod respectively.

Differences between the Roman commanders prevented regular coordination between their armies, resulting in their annihilation by the united Cimbrian-Teutonic force. Roman losses are thought to have been as high as 80,000 legionaries and another 40,000 auxiliary troops, with total losses numbering up to 120,000 soldiers, the entirety of both armies. In terms of losses, this battle is regarded as the worst defeat in the history of ancient Rome, surpassing the Battle of Cannae. The battle resulted in the Roman military being restructured under Gaius Marius through his Marian reforms, which significantly changed the organisation and recruitment of Roman legions. These changes would remain principally intact for centuries. However, some historians have questioned the implementation of sudden reforms under Marius.

== Prelude ==
The migrations of the Cimbri tribe through Gaul and adjacent territories had disturbed the balance of power and incited or provoked other tribes, such as the Helvetii, into conflict with the Romans. An ambush of Roman troops and the temporary rebellion of the town of Tolosa (modern Toulouse) caused Roman troops to mobilize in the area, with eighty strong forces.

Having regained Tolosa, the proconsul Quintus Servilius Caepio adopted a defensive strategy, waiting to see if the Cimbri would move toward Roman territories again. On 6 October 105 BC, they did.

Even before the battle had erupted, the Romans were in trouble. The senior of the year's two consuls, Publius Rutilius Rufus, was an experienced and highly decorated soldier, veteran of the recent war in Numidia, but he did not take charge of the military campaign himself but remained in Rome while his inexperienced, untried colleague Gnaeus Mallius Maximus led the legions north. The reasons for Rutilius not taking charge himself do not seem to be known: perhaps he faced political opposition because of his friendship with Gaius Marius, or perhaps he believed Mallius Maximus deserved the chance to earn himself a share of glory, or perhaps he was simply temporarily ill.

Two of the major Roman forces available were camped out on the Rhone River, near Arausio: one led by Mallius Maximus, and the other by the proconsul Quintus Servilius Caepio. As the consul of the year, Maximus out-ranked Caepio and therefore should by law have been the senior commander of the combined armies. However, because Maximus was a novus homo and therefore lacked the noble background of the Roman aristocracy – in addition to his military inexperience – Caepio refused to serve under him and made camp on the opposite side of the river.

== Battle ==
The initial contact between the Romans and Cimbri occurred when a detached picketing group under the legate Marcus Aurelius Scaurus met an advance party of the Cimbri. The Roman force was completely overwhelmed and the legate was captured and brought before king Boiorix. Scaurus was not humbled by his capture and advised Boiorix to turn back before his people were destroyed by the Roman forces. The king of the Cimbri was indignant at this impudence and had Scaurus executed.

Caepio, however, only crossed the river after a direct order from the Senate, but even then insisted on having a separate camp and ignored orders from Mallius.

According to historian Theodor Mommsen, Caepio was presumably motivated into action by the thought that Maximus might be successful in negotiations and claim all the credit for a successful outcome; he launched a unilateral attack on the Cimbri camp on 6 October. However, Caepio's force was annihilated because of the hasty nature of the assault and the tenacity of Cimbri defence. The Cimbri were able to ransack Caepio's camp, which had been left practically undefended. Caepio himself escaped from the battle unhurt.

With a great boost in confidence from an easy victory, the Cimbri then proceeded to destroy the force commanded by Maximus. Already at a low ebb due to the infighting of the commanders, this Roman force had witnessed the complete destruction of their comrades. In other circumstances the army might have fled, but the poor positioning of the camp left them with their backs to the river. Many tried to escape in that direction, but crossing the river would have been difficult encumbered with armor. Very few Romans managed to escape. This includes the servants and camp followers, who usually numbered at least half as many again as the actual troops. Livy, quoting Valerius Antias, states Roman losses as 80,000 soldiers and 40,000 servants and camp followers killed.

== Aftermath ==
Rome was a warfaring nation and accustomed to military setbacks. However, the recent string of defeats ending in the calamity at Arausio was alarming for the people of Rome. The defeat left them not only with a critical shortage of manpower and lost military equipment, but with a terrifying enemy camped on the other side of the now-undefended Alpine passes. In Rome, it was widely thought that the defeat was due to the arrogance of Caepio rather than to a deficiency in the Roman Army, and popular dissatisfaction with the ruling classes grew.

The Cimbri next clashed with the Arverni tribe, and after a hard struggle set out for the Pyrenees, instead of immediately marching into Italy. This gave the Romans time to re-organise and elect new leadership. The catastrophic scale of the loss, which cut a swathe through aristocrats and commoners, led the Roman Senate and people to set aside the peacetime legal constraints that prevented a man from being consul a second time, until ten years had passed since his first consulship. They elected the skilled general Gaius Marius (despite his absence) as senior consul only three years after his first consulship. Then, for a further unprecedented four successive years, they continued to elect him as senior consul, thus commander-in-chief of all Roman forces, while the war was being prosecuted. Eventually the Romans under Marius finally defeated the Teutons and Ambrones in the Battle of Aquae Sextiae as they attempted to advance through the Alps into Italy.

== In fiction ==
The battle as well as the events surrounding it are described in detail in Colleen McCullough's 1990 historical fiction novel The First Man in Rome. It features in Philip Matyszak's 2013 historical novel The Gold of Tolosa.
