= Teutons =

Ancient northern European tribe

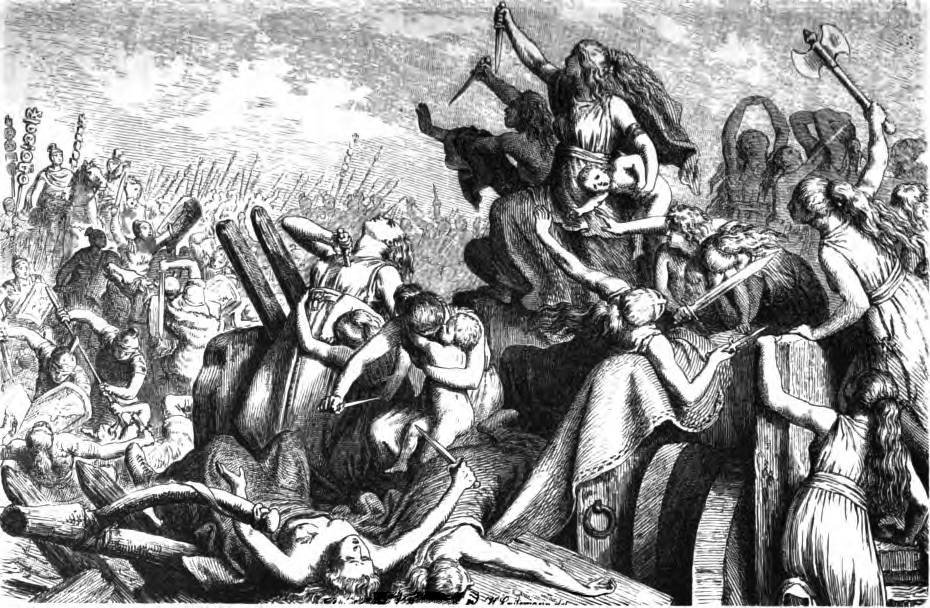
"The Women of the Teutones Defend the Wagon Fort" (1882) by Heinrich Leutemann

The Teutons (Latin: Teutones, Teutoni; Ancient Greek: Τεύτονες) were an ancient northern European tribe mentioned by Roman authors. The Teutons are best known for their participation, together with the Cimbri and other groups, in the Cimbrian War with the Roman Republic in the late 2nd century BC.

Some generations later, Julius Caesar compared them to the Germanic peoples of his own time, and used this term for all northern peoples living east of the Rhine. Later Roman authors followed his identification. However, there is no direct evidence as to whether they spoke a Germanic language. Evidence such as the tribal name, and the names of their rulers, as they were mentioned by Roman historians, indicates a strong Celtic influence. On the other hand, the indications that classical authors gave about the homeland of the Teutones is considered by many scholars to show that they lived in an area associated with early Germanic languages, and not in an area associated with Celtic languages.

== Name ==
The ethnonym appears in Latin as Teutonēs or Teutoni in the plural, and less commonly as Teuton or Teutonus in the singular. It transparently originates from the Proto-Indo-European stem *tewtéh₂-, meaning "people, tribe, crowd," (e.g. the Celtic deity Teutates whose name is understood as "god of the tribe"), with the addition of the suffix -ones, which is frequently found in both Celtic (e.g., Lingones, Senones) and Germanic (e.g., Ingvaeones, Semnones) tribal names during the Roman period. The term conveys the idea of a "mass of people", in contrast to distinguished individuals—such as leaders or heroes—or those belonging to a more elite group. It may have originally meant "people under arms" in Proto-Indo-European, as suggested by the Hittite tuzzi- and the Luwian tuta ("army").

The name Teutones can be interpreted either as Celtic, from the Proto-Celtic *towtā ("people, tribe)", or as pre-Germanic. Its recorded spellings do not match the later Proto-Germanic form *þeudō- ("nation, people, folk," cf. Gothic þiuda), which suggests that if it is indeed Germanic, it must derive from an earlier stage of the language (prior to the first consonantal shift), unless the Greek and Latin renditions are corrupt and do not accurately represent the original form. The stem tewtéh₂- is so widespread in Indo-European languages that linking the ethnonym to other names with the same origin, such as the Teutoburg Forest (Teutoburgensis saltus), is challenging.

Later on, beginning with ninth-century monastic Latin texts, the term Teuton came to refer specifically to speakers of West Germanic languages—a usage that has persisted into modern times. Originally, it was used as a learned alternative to the similar-sounding term theodiscus, which was a Latinized form of the contemporary West Germanic word meaning "of the people". By extension, the adjective "Teutonic" has often been used more broadly to mean the same as "Germanic".

== Linguistic affiliations ==
The Teutons are commonly classified as a Germanic tribe and thought probably to have spoken a Germanic language, although the evidence is fragmentary. However, because of the non-Germanic, possibly Celtic, form of the names of both the Teutones and their associates the Cimbri, as well as the personal names known from these tribes, some historians have suggested a Celtic origin for the Teutones.

The earliest classical writers classified the Teutones as Celts; more generally, they did not distinguish between Celtic and Germanic peoples. Apparently, this distinction was first made by Julius Caesar, whose main concern was to argue that raids into southern Gaul and Italy by northern peoples who were less softened by Mediterranean civilization, should be seen in Rome as a systematic problem that can repeat in the future, and thereby demanded pre-emptive military action. This was his justification for invading northern Gaul.

After Caesar, Strabo (died circa AD 24) and Marcus Velleius Paterculus (died circa AD 31) classify Teutons as Germanic peoples. Pliny also classified them this way and specified that they were among the Ingaevones, related to the Cimbri and Chauci.

== Homeland ==
Plutarch in his biography of Marius, who fought the Teutones, wrote that they and the Cimbri "had not had intercourse with other peoples, and had traversed a great stretch of country, so that it could not be ascertained what people it was nor whence they had set out". He reported that there were different conjectures: that they were "some of the German peoples which extended as far as the northern ocean"; that they were "Galloscythians", a mixture of Scythians and Celts who had lived as far east as the Black Sea, or that the Cimbri were Cimmerians, from even farther east.

The fourth century BC traveller Pytheas, as reported by Pliny the Elder (died AD 79), described the Teutones as neighbours of the northern island of Abalus where amber washed up in the spring, and was traded by the Teutones. Abalus was one day's sail from a tidal marsh or estuary facing the ocean (aestuarium) called Metuonis inhabited by another Germanic people, the Guiones (probably either the Inguaeones, or Gutones).

Pomponius Mela (died circa 45 CE) stated that the Teutons lived on a large island, Codannovia, which was one of a group of islands in a large bay called Codanus, open to the ocean. Most scholars have interpreted this bay as being the Baltic Sea, and Codannovia as being Scandinavia.

31. On the other side of the Albis [Elbe], the huge Codanus Bay [Baltic Sea] is filled with big and small islands. For this reason, where the sea is received within the fold of the bay, it never lies wide open and never really looks like a sea but is sprinkled around, rambling and scattered like rivers, with water flowing in every direction and crossing many times. Where the sea comes into contact with the mainland, the sea is contained by the banks of islands, banks that are not far offshore and that are virtually equidistant everywhere. There the sea runs a narrow course like a strait, then, curving, it promptly adapts to a long brow of land. 32. On the bay are the Cimbri and the Teutoni; farther on, the farthest people of Germany, the Hermiones.

[...]

54. The thirty Orcades [Orkney Islands] are separated by narrow spaces between them; the seven Haemodae [Denmark] extend opposite Germany in what we have called Codanus Bay; of the islands there, Scandinavia [sic: the manuscript has Codannavia], which the Teutoni still hold, stands out as much for its size as for its fertility besides.

Surviving texts based on the work of the geographer Ptolemy mentioned both Teutones and "Teutonoaroi" in Germania, but this is in a part of his text that has become garbled in surviving copies. Gudmund Schütte proposed that the two peoples should be understood as one, but that different versions of works based on that of Ptolemy used literary sources such as Pliny and Mela to place them in different positions somewhere near the Cimbri, in a part of the landscape they did not have good information for – either in Zealand or Scandinavia, or else somewhere on the southern Baltic coast.

According to scholar Stefan Zimmer (2005), since both the name of the Teutones and Crimbri left traces in place names from Jutland (in Thy and Himmerland, respectively), "there is no reason to doubt the ancient accounts of the origins of the two tribes".

== Cimbrian War ==
After achieving decisive victories over the Romans at Noreia and Arausio in 105 BC, the Cimbri and Teutones divided their forces. Gaius Marius then defeated them separately in 102 BC and 101 BC respectively, ending the Cimbrian War. The defeat of the Teutones occurred at the Battle of Aquae Sextiae (near present-day Aix-en-Provence).

According to the writings of Valerius Maximus and Florus, the king of the Teutones, Teutobod, was taken in irons after the Teutones were defeated by the Romans. Under the conditions of the surrender, three hundred married women were to be handed over to the victorious Romans as concubines and slaves. When the matrons of the Teutones heard of this stipulation, they begged the consul that they might instead be allowed to minister in the temples of Ceres and Venus. When their request was denied, the Teutonic women slew their own children. The next morning, all the women were found dead in each other's arms, having strangled each other during the night. Their joint martyrdom passed into Roman legends of Teutonic fury.

Reportedly, some surviving captives participated as the rebelling gladiators in the Third Servile War of 73–71 BC.

== See also ==
- Furor Teutonicus
