= City on the Magdalensberg =

Noric settlement in Carinthia, Austria

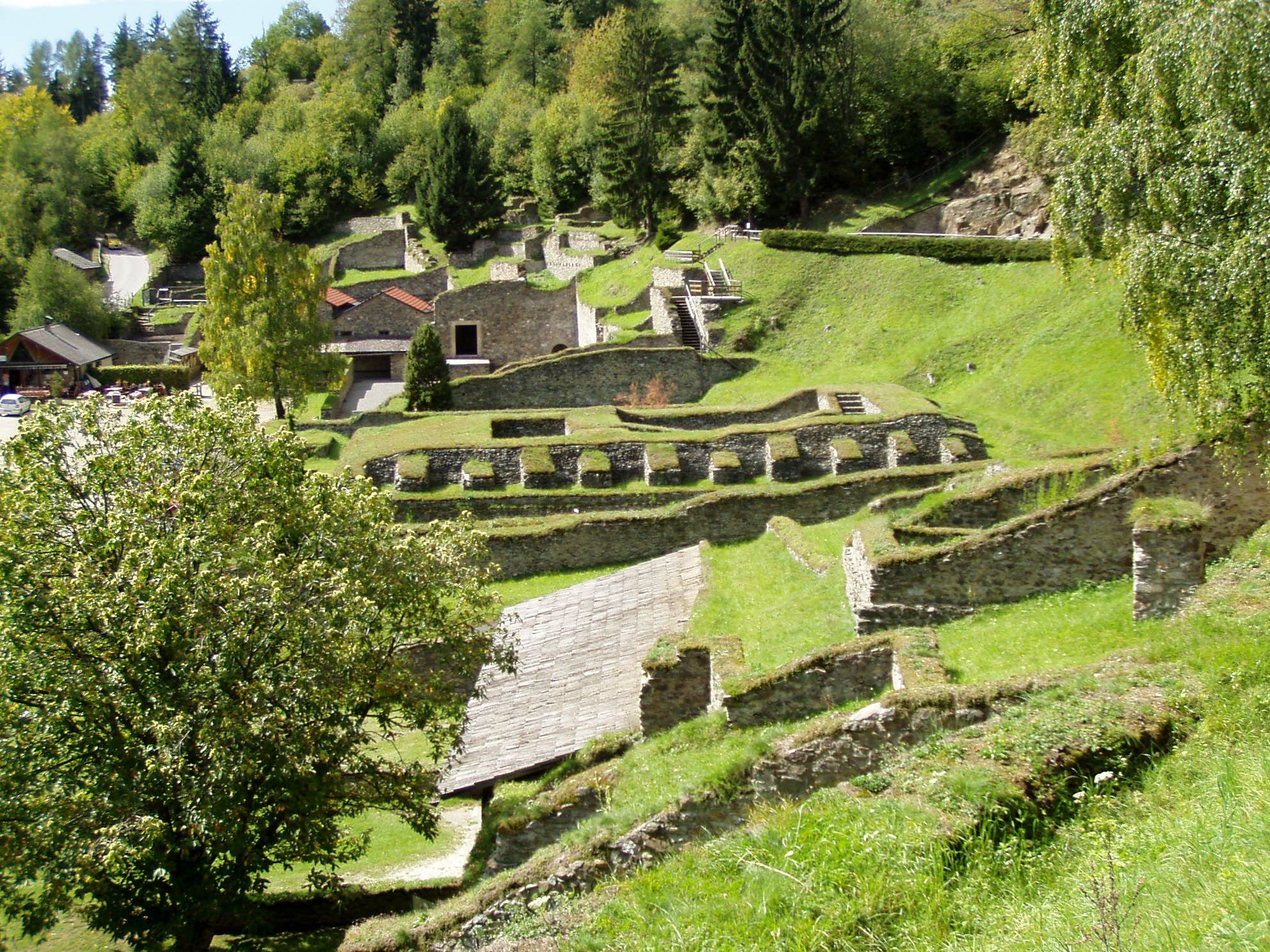
View of the temple and praetorium from the east

The Stadt auf dem Magdalensberg (lit German: city on the Magdalensberg), is a Noric settlement inhabited from the 1st century BC to the mid 1st century AD, located on the slopes and summit plateau of Magdalensberg on the edge of the Carinthian Zollfeld. It was an important trading hub before and during the initial phase of Roman occupation, particularly for Noric iron. However, with the establishment of the Roman city of Virunum on the Zollfeld, the settlement was ultimately abandoned, with a documented duration spanning approximately 90 years. Notably, one of the most significant discoveries from this site is the Youth of Magdalensberg.

== History ==
=== Start of settlement ===
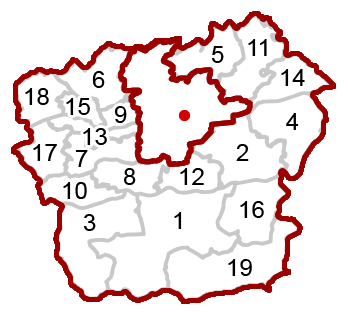

In the 3rd century BC, the Celtic Noric people settled in the area of present-day Carinthia. Due to the rich and high-quality iron deposits (Ferrum Noricum - Noric iron), a lively trade with the Mediterranean region developed. In 170 BC, the Noricans entered into a hospitality treaty, known as hospitium publicum, with Rome. As trade relations flourished, Roman merchants began to settle on Magdalensberg around the mid 1st century BC and established a market known as an emporium.

The choice of site was influenced by the presence of the Noric king's residence on Magdalensberg and the protective sanctuary on the summit. Despite this, there is currently no known Celtic settlement on Magdalensberg, possibly because most excavations have focused on the Roman period. Nevertheless, the site was strategically positioned in close proximity to the iron ore deposits of the Görtschitztal (Hüttenberger Erzberg) and Lölling regions.

In 2006, initial excavations conducted on the hill's northern side revealed several ramparts. One of these ramparts dated to the period between 40 and 30 BC. This rampart resembles the Fécamp type, which is predominantly found in late Celtic central and northern France.

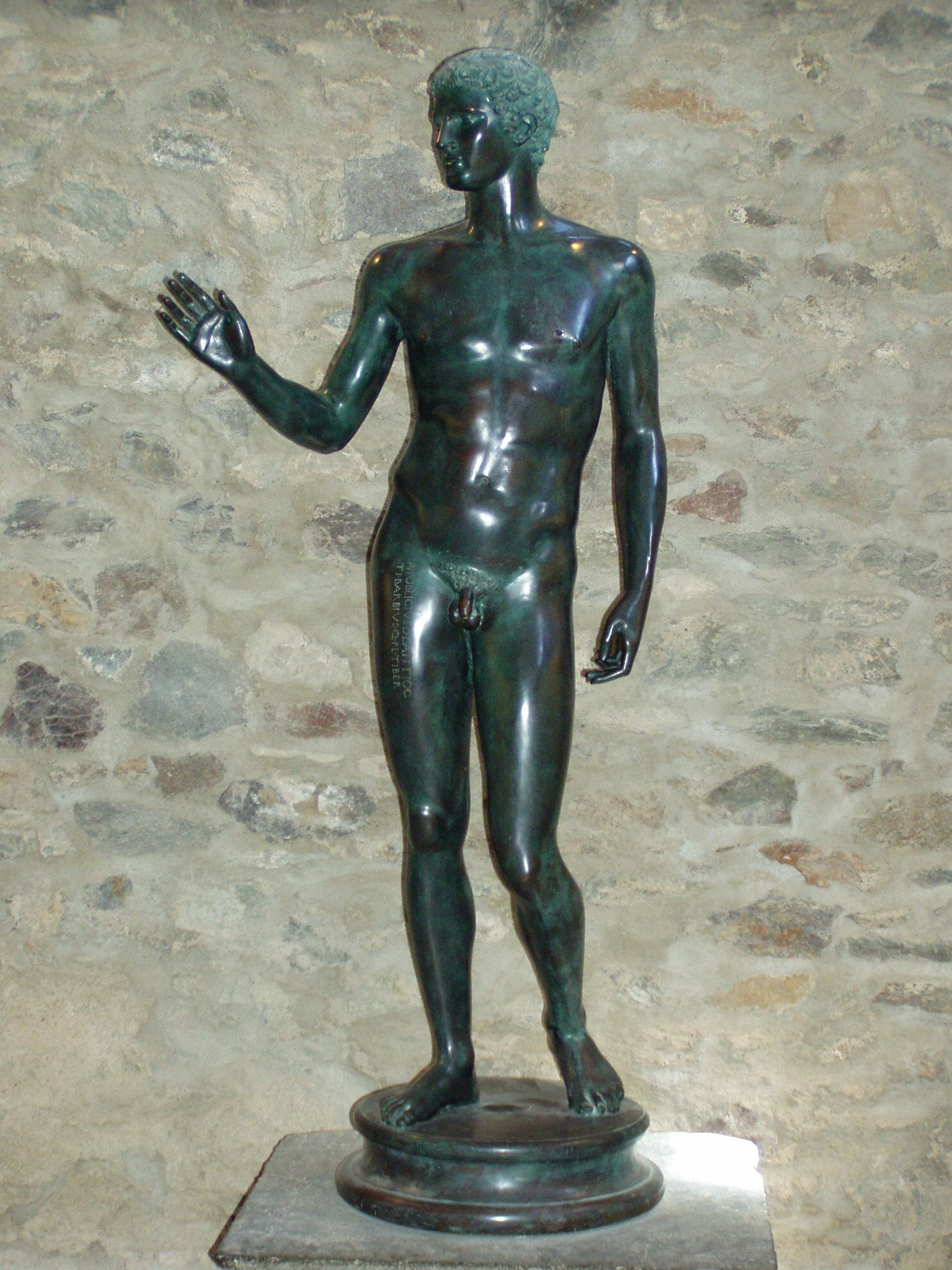
The Jüngling vom Magdalensberg

There are limited findings about the initial phase of the Roman market. It may have been mainly smelting sites for the Norse iron and simple accommodation. The significance of the place already at that time becomes clear by the consecration of the Youth of Magdalensberg by two merchants, which fell into this period.

Trade between the settlement and Rome experienced a boost during the mid 1st century BC. The surge in trade was attributed to the high demand for weapons and other goods due to Caesar's Gallic campaigns and the subsequent civil wars. Around this time a forum was built within the settlement. The forum was surrounded by tabernas, which served as warehouses, offices, and residences. On the western side, a basilica was built, fulfilling the function of a bathhouse. Adjacent to the basilica, on the eastern narrow side, stood a market basilica measuring 30 × 17 m. This complex on the southern slope below the summit area, reflects Italian influences in its layout and is unparalleled in the inner eastern Alpine region. The construction phases of the complex can be categorized into four periods: pre- and early Augustus, mature Augustus, late Augustus-early Tiberius, and early Claudius.

In the 20s BC, the Noricans built a fortification with a central sanctuary of an almost propagandistic-representative shape on the summit plateau. The design of the merchant buildings during this time indicated a period of prosperity, both in terms of materials and cultural aspects. These houses were built using the mortar masonry technique with plastered walls and painted interiors. Notably, frescoes adorned the walls in the second and third Pompeian styles, (around 20 BC). These frescoes depicted captivating mythological and bucolic scenes, adding artistic significance to the structures.

The wealth of the merchants is reflected in their overall lifestyle: they adopted Italian customs, as seen in their consumption of imported garum (a spicy fish sauce), olives, and wine, which were served in dishes made of bronze, glass, and terra sigillata (fine pottery vessels). The presence of portrait sculptures, the oldest found in the territory of present-day Austria, suggests the involvement of Roman sculptors. These sculptures, along with the portraits of Noric women and inscriptions with Celtic names indicate that the locals actively embraced Roman culture. In addition to trade, the settlement engaged in extensive production of goods. Workshops for non-ferrous metal processing, particularly brass, were situated in the quarter east of the forum. These workshops manufactured items such as brooches, belt buckles, and other products to meet local demands as well as for export within the Noric region.

=== Roman occupation ===
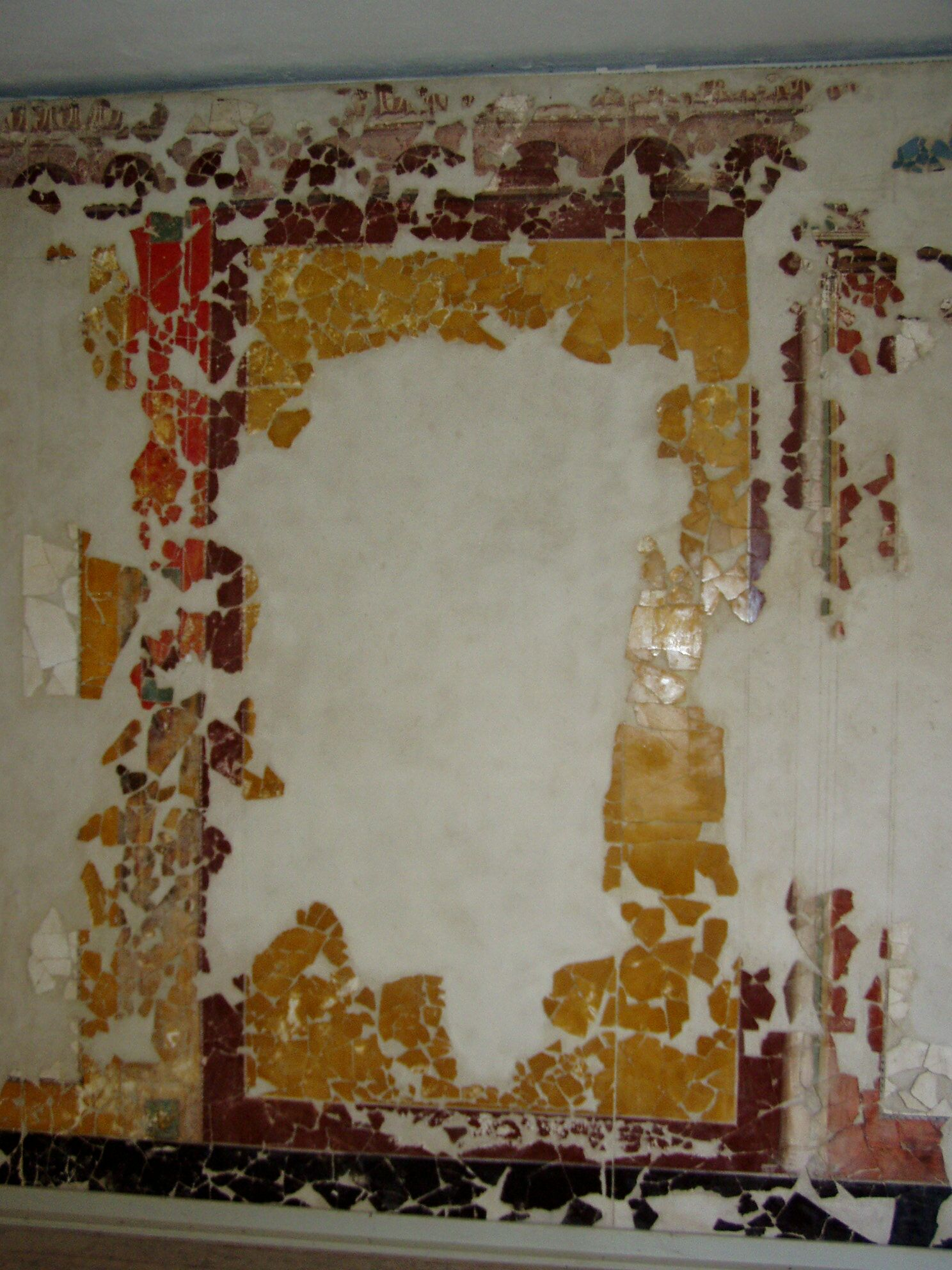
Wall paintings from the consultation room reconstructed from debris

The incorporation into the Roman Empire in 16/15 BC took place peacefully in Noricum. As a result, Noric traditions and tribal structures were largely preserved. The integration resulted in a status elevation for the city of Magdalensberg. It became the political center of the Roman eastern Alpine region, resulting in enormous construction activity. It is possible that the existing structures were damaged or destroyed during an earthquake between 10 and 20 AD, which is not documented in the sources. There were significant changes in the area of the forum_{;} the tabernacles in the northwest were filled in and the Praetorium was built on the site. In the case of the tabernas on the east side, the original basement buildings were complemented by above-ground structures.

During the reign of Tiberius, the podium temple was built on the north side, initially with a four-column façade. During this period, a large fire broke out in the eastern forum region, primarily destroying homes and warehouses. In early Claudian times, the reconstruction of the peripteral temple with a six-columned façade was started but left unfinished. The non-ferrous metal workshops east of the forum were replaced by residential buildings and accessed by a road from the forum leading to a double gate at the eastern edge of the hill hollow.

On the terrace southwest of the Forum, a large bathhouse was built to replace the original bath at the Forum, which had now been converted into a representative building. On the eastern southern slope, large two-story residential buildings with up to 150 m^{2} living spaces were built.

During this time the city reached an extension of about 3 km^{2}. The number of inhabitants was probably between 3000 and 5000.

=== Abandonment of the settlement ===
Immediately before the middle of the 1st century, archaeological discoveries within the city's boundaries came to an end, except for the sanctuary located on the hilltop, which continued to yield finds until late antiquity. The abandonment of the settlement occurred swiftly, leaving several structures, such as the temple, unfinished. The city was succeeded by the Municipium Claudium Virunum, established directly at the base of the mountain in the Zollfeld, which emerged in the late 40s in place of a small roadside village. The roadside village was strategically positioned along the crucial central Noric road route connecting the Danube to Italy, with the road leading from there to the Magdalensberg.

Virunum, like many other similar cities in the new provinces, was a planned foundation as an autonomous Roman city, inheriting the role of capital and possibly its name from the city on the Magdalensberg.

== City name ==
The name of the Stadt auf dem Magdalensberg (city on the Magdalensberg) has not been preserved in historical sources. There are two theories regarding its identity.

One theory suggests that the city on Magdalensberg is the same as Noreia, the site of the famous Battle of Noreia between the Romans and Germanic tribes, as mentioned by Caesar. However, this theory faces challenges as no archaeological finds from the 2nd century BC, when Noreia was mentioned, have been discovered on Magdalensberg. As a result, this theory has been losing support in recent times.

Instead, an alternative hypothesis suggests that the town on Magdalensberg may have been called Virunum, similar to its successor on the Zollfeld. It was common for newly established Roman municipalities to adopt the names of their predecessor settlements, often situated on hills. Additionally, a fragment of an inscription tablet discovered in the vestibule of the Representation House contains the letters VIRV[...], which could potentially indicate the name. Gerhard Dobesch also proposed that a foundation legend of Virunum, preserved in late antique sources, might refer to the Stadt auf dem Magdalensberg (city on the Magdalensberg) due to its geographical description. However, the interpretation of VIRV on the Magdalensberg inscription as a place name is not definitive, as it could also be part of a funerary inscription such as "VIR V(ivus) F(ecit)" meaning "The consort erected it (the tomb) during his lifetime." Moreover, the geographical details provided in the foundation legend of Virunum does not offer conclusive evidence for a specific location. Therefore, the name of the Stadt auf dem Magdalensberg (city on Magdalensberg) remains uncertain.

Otto Helmut Urban, on the other hand, also considers a name change from Noreia to Virunum possible.

== Facilities on the top of the mountain ==
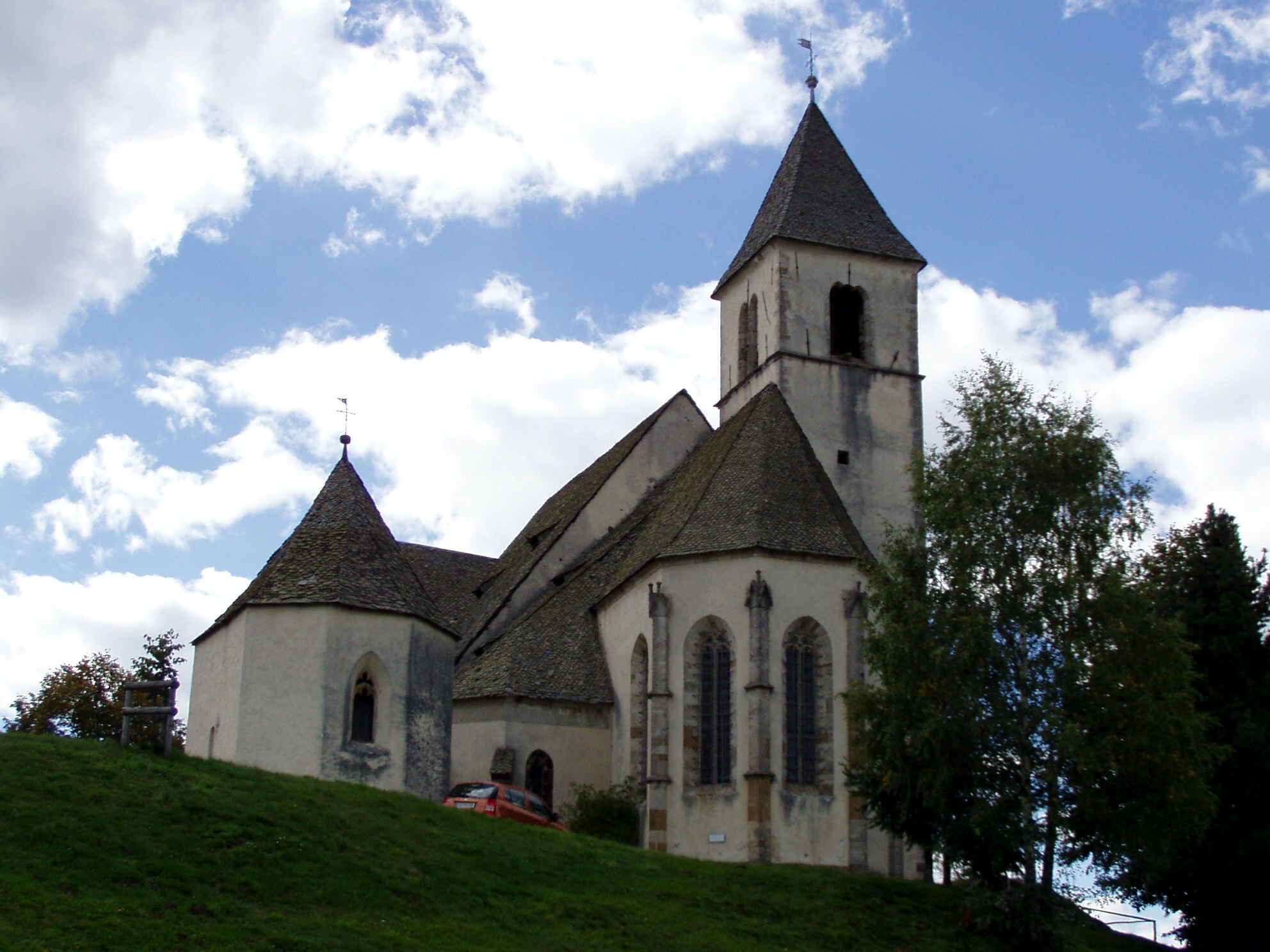
Below the branch church on the mountaintop are the remains of the Celtic sanctuary

At the mountain summit, there was a Celtic sanctuary surrounded by a monumental fortification, but practically no excavations have been preserved above ground. Only a few wall remnants from the double gate, which had a 30 m long hose gate and a box gate in front, are still visible on the road leading up to the church. In front of the gate was a glacis 90 m long and 30 m wide. The summit plateau was surrounded by a double wall ring. The outer walls were up to 2.1 m thick at the base. Between the walls was a running ditch up to 3m wide. Within this fortification was a third wall ring with a third gate. The gates may have facades made of marble.

The dimensions of the walls, the masonry technique, and the types of mortar indicate that the fortress was built by Roman fortress architects. It was built in the years before 20 BC. It was demolished in the late Augustan-Tiberian period. It is unclear whether the fortress was demolished after the Roman occupation in 15 BC or whether it was destroyed by an earthquake.

In the area to the west in front of the church, a construction was excavated, which consisted of a clay floor or a rock surface 50 cm higher, covered with yellow mortar. Holes for logs had been cut out of the rock, and inside the area, there were two pits 1.5 m deep. These were carefully buried and covered with marble slabs. Similar to the late Celtic sanctuaries in Gournay-sur-Aronde and Acy-Romance, the discovery might be recreated as a roofed structure with two pits.

In the vicinity of the church, there was a podium temple whose reconstruction is based on emergency excavations conducted in 2006. The rock was horizontally and vertically leveled over an approximately 25.5 × 16.5-meter space, creating a raised platform of about 2 meters in height. A podium was on top of this platform, covered with Kraig marble similar to the surrounding rock walls, while the floor was adorned with slate slabs. Based on the proportions provided (85 Roman feet in length, 55 feet in width, and 7 feet in height), it is believed that the podium temple was hexastyle, accessible via an open stairway on the western side. Various older finds in the summit area, including the bargeman (a clay sculpture likely interpreted as a votive offering), a fragment of an offering bowl, parts of a robed statue, roof tiles, antefixes, and cornice fragments, can be associated with this building. It is also likely that the Youth of Magdalensberg was originally placed here. The construction is estimated to have taken place after the middle of the 1st century BC. Remarkably, unlike the rest of the city, the sanctuary remained in use until late antiquity.

The complex can also be interpreted as a princely seat, although this interpretation remains speculative as only the foundations of the walls have been found. Due to the size of the complex and the involvement of Roman architects, almost only the Noric king can be considered as the builder.

== Buildings around the Forum ==
The center of the Roman settlement was located on the southern slope about 200 meters in altitude below the summit in a slight depression. Nevertheless, in order to obtain a level surface for the forum and the surrounding buildings, rock, and earth had to be removed from the slope and filled in on the south side.

=== Forum and dealer branch ===
The forum is 110 × 42 m. The path to the peak led and continues to lead on the southern long side. Two major phases can be distinguished in the overall layout of the forum:

During the Republican period of the Noric Kingdom, the eastern side of the forum housed the merchant basilica. The remaining sides were occupied by merchant taverns, which were initially constructed using wood but were soon replaced by stone houses with cellars. On the western side, before the occupation of Noricum, the basilica of the House of Representation was erected.

After the Roman occupation, the imperial forum was established, leading to significant changes in the layout of the city. The merchants' basilica, which previously occupied a prominent role, was demolished, and its functions were transferred to the newly built Praetorium on the northwestern side. On the northern side, the temple was erected in the location previously occupied by the taverns. The existing taverns were replaced with new ones, which now served as stores and workshops. These new taverns featured large wing gates, allowing for easy access and transportation of goods.

=== Temple district ===
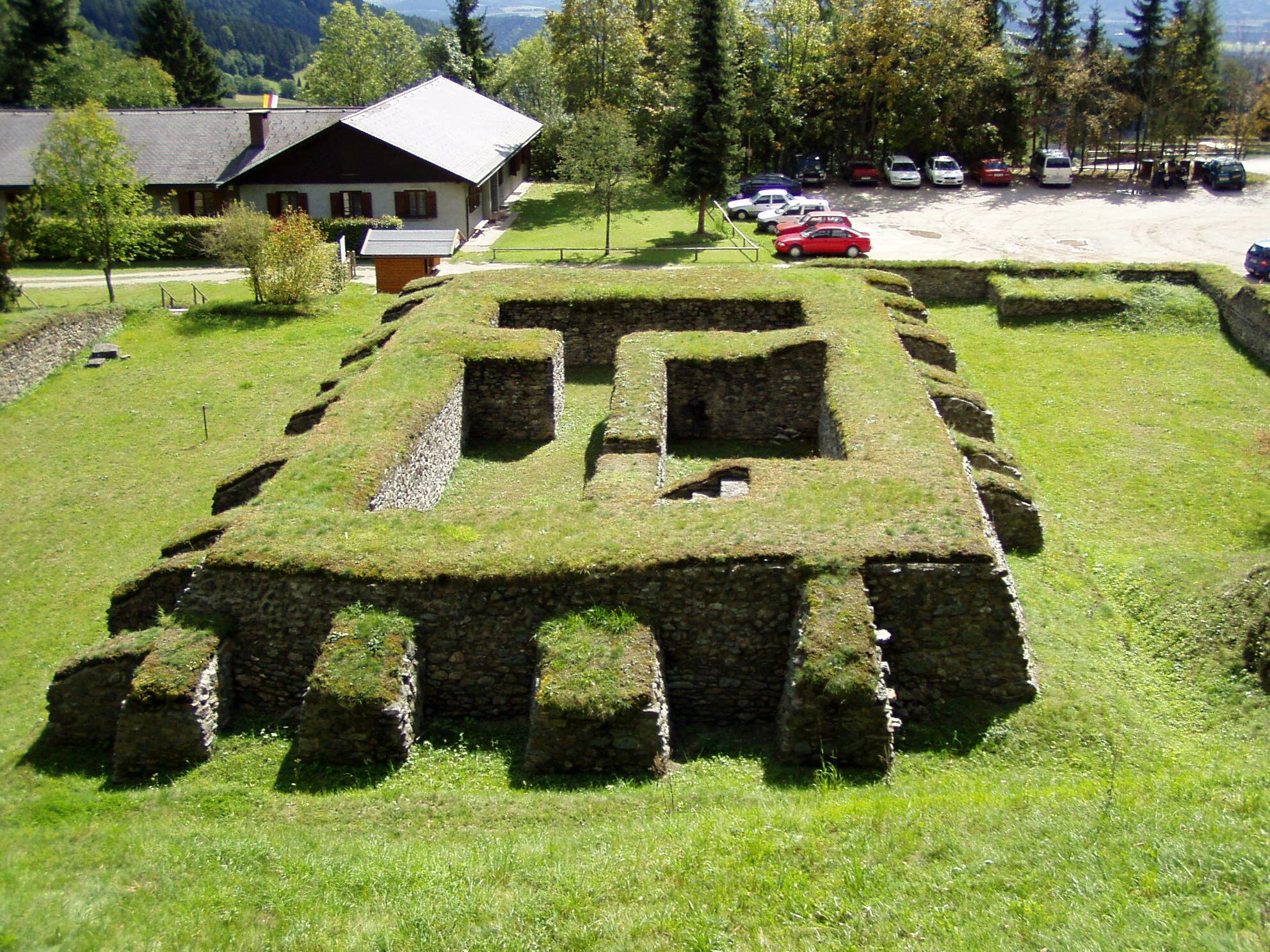
The temple seen from the northern slope; in the background on the left the modern building of the excavation management at the site of the merchant basilica of the first construction phase, on the right the parking lot at the site of the forum

The temple district is located centrally on the northern side of the forum, positioned two meters higher than the forum on the mountainside. The district spans an area of 54.6 meters in length and 45.3 meters in width. In its final form, it was a podium temple measuring 30 meters in length and 17.6 meters in width. The inner chamber, known as the cella, measured 21 × 11 m and was likely surrounded by either eleven or six columns. On each of the longer sides of the temple, there was a spacious courtyard and a hall. Only the substructure of the temple remains intact, featuring two cellars (known as favissae), accessible via a staircase on the mountainside. The temple's basement was used to store public funds.

There was an earlier, smaller temple structure associated with this temple. Both temples were dedicated to the deities Divus Augustus and Dea Roma. The temple would represent the earliest known example of an emperor cult in what is now Austria. The construction of the second temple began during the reign of Claudius but remained unfinished, lacking certain elements such as the stairway from the forum. The temple lacks marble claddings, which were presumably reused in Virunum.

The temple on the Magdalensberg stands out in size compared to other provincial towns, suggesting its significance in the region. It is believed that the temple stood on the site of an older Celtic sanctuary, which adds to its historical and cultural significance. Within the temple district, three mountain pits were discovered, one of which contained a deliberately cut human skull. On the side facing the forum, beneath the temple district, there are remnants of tavern buildings dating back to the middle of the 1st century BC.

=== Praetorium ===
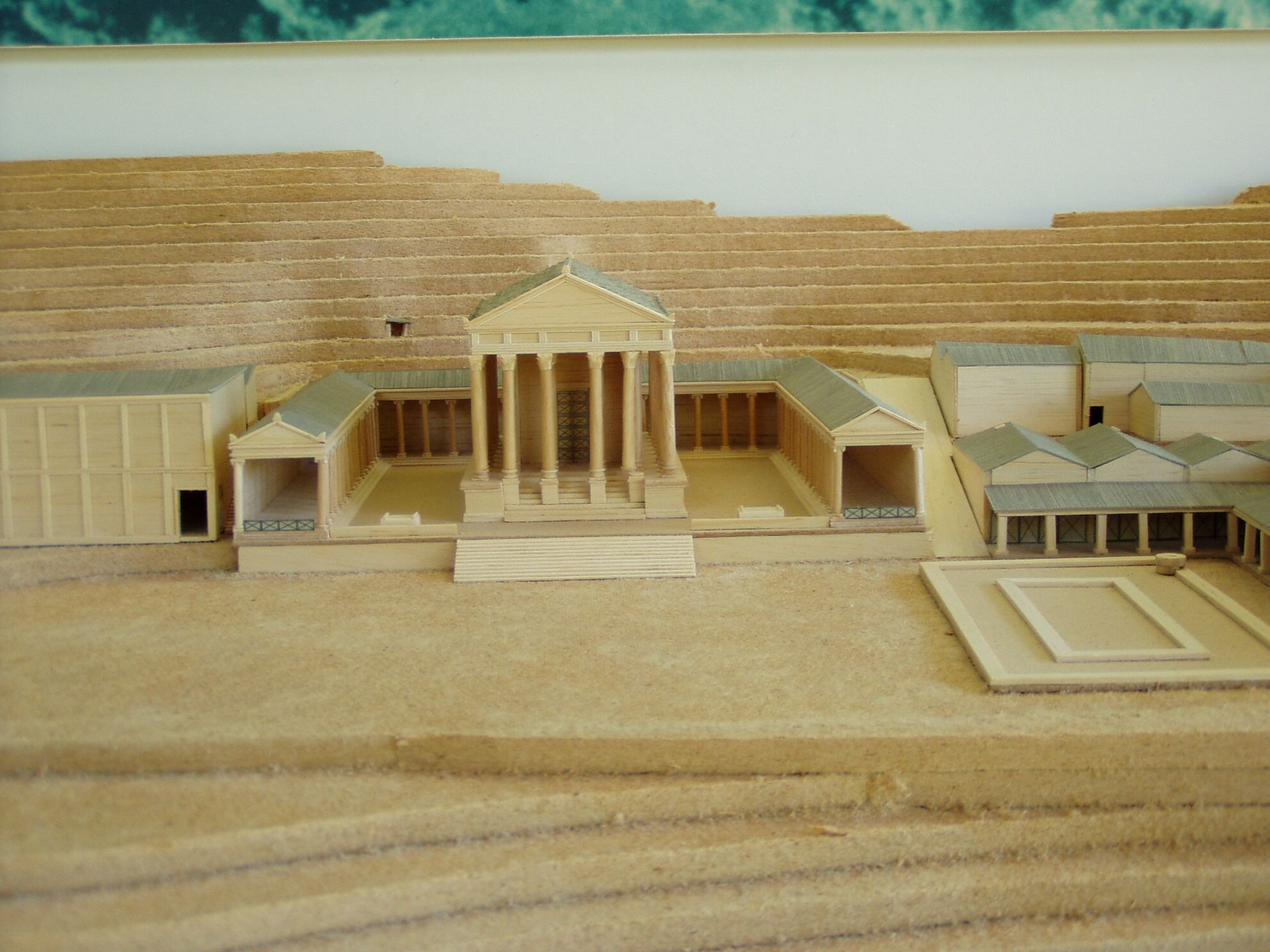
Reconstruction of the temple in the last unfinished construction phase

Located west of the temple district and on the north side of the forum was the Praetorium, (Room M), a basilica-like building that served as the administrative center. Room M spanned a length of 100 Roman feet (equivalent to 29.6 meters) and was surrounded by halls on the north, south, and east sides, providing protection from rain and sunlight. To the west of Room M, there was a double staircase leading to the deliberation room and a podium or suggestus. On this podium representatives of Rome delivered legal speeches, announced decrees, and conducted voting processes. It was a significant space for the administration and governance of the settlement.

The council chamber (room K) was decorated with wall paintings from the Tiberian period. It featured field painting with rectangular fields in various colors.

However, this interpretation is now being questioned. The collection of buildings is sometimes seen as a basilica, tabularium, and assembly hall. The little explored plateau building northwest of the forum is considered the official building in this instance.

=== House of Representatives ===
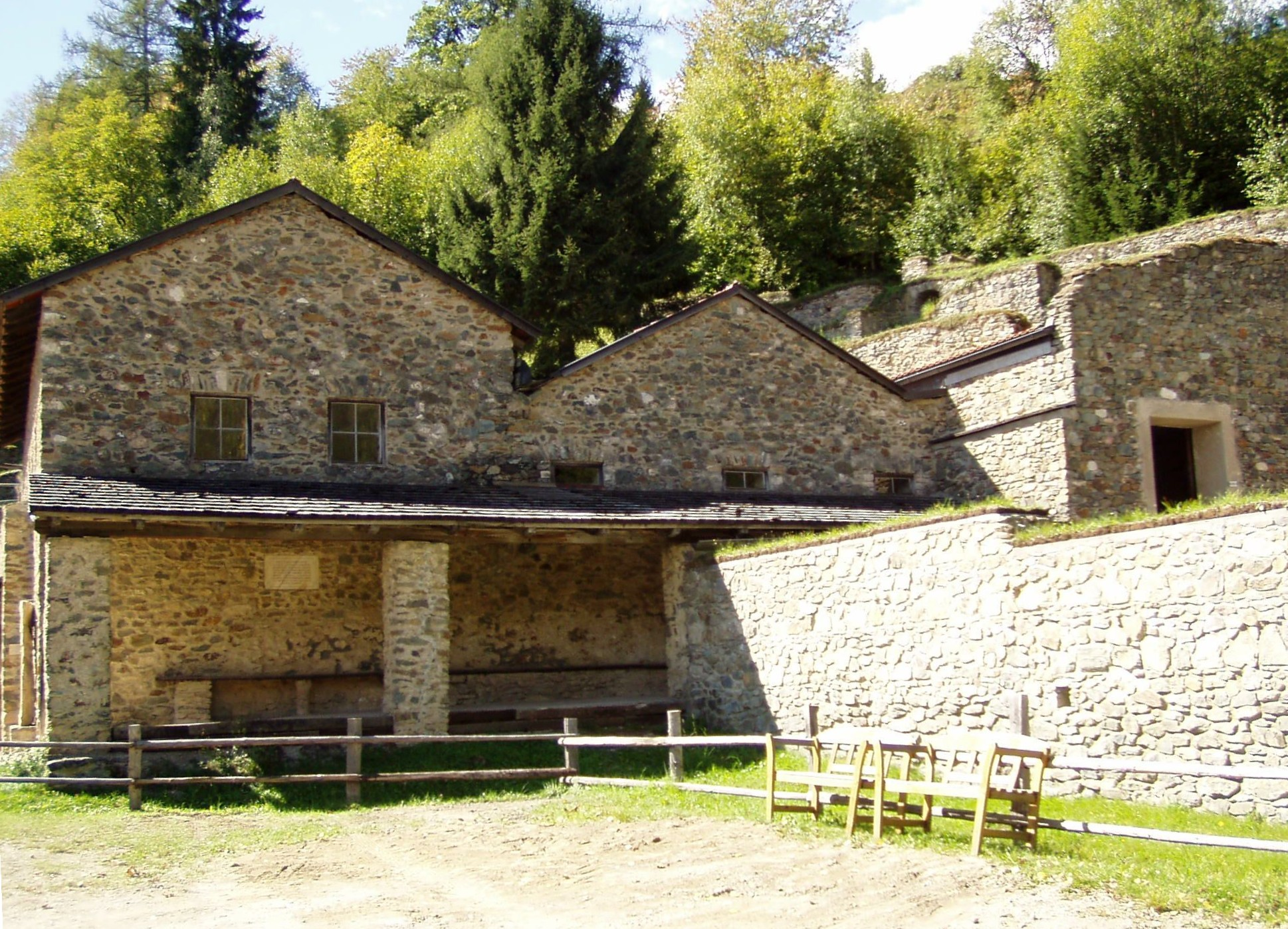
Representation House seen from the Forum

The use of Representation House (RP House) changed over time, which was associated with repeated renovations. It is situated within a building complex aligned in a north–south direction on the western side of the Forum. This complex can be divided into three distinct sections: a three-story block with smaller rooms (L, V, W, K) on the mountain's north side, a central block (A-E, I, J) known as the representation house, and a later addition consisting of two halls (F, G). The central block is the Representation House and consists of an entrance corridor, an anteroom, a niche room, and an apse hall (A).

During its initial construction phase, when the Roman merchants were present, room A with the apse formed part of a 12-meter-long basilica. This space likely served as the office for the magistri, and the market administrators. The second phase of construction coincided with the Roman occupation in 15 BC. At this time, the basilica was transformed into a structure comprising three rooms and an entrance corridor. Notably, underfloor heating (hypocaust) was installed in room A, and a water basin was constructed within the apse, suggesting its purpose as a bathing area. On the north side of the building, there was likely a bathtub. All of this suggests its use as a bathing facility.

The third building period can be equated with the fire in 15 AD. The room layout remained the same, but the floor in room A was raised by about one meter, and the water basin was covered. It likely served as a meeting hall, where the representatives of Rome discussed national policy with the emissaries of the Noric tribes. Room B with its 13 wall niches was used as an archive.

=== Residential and workshop district ===
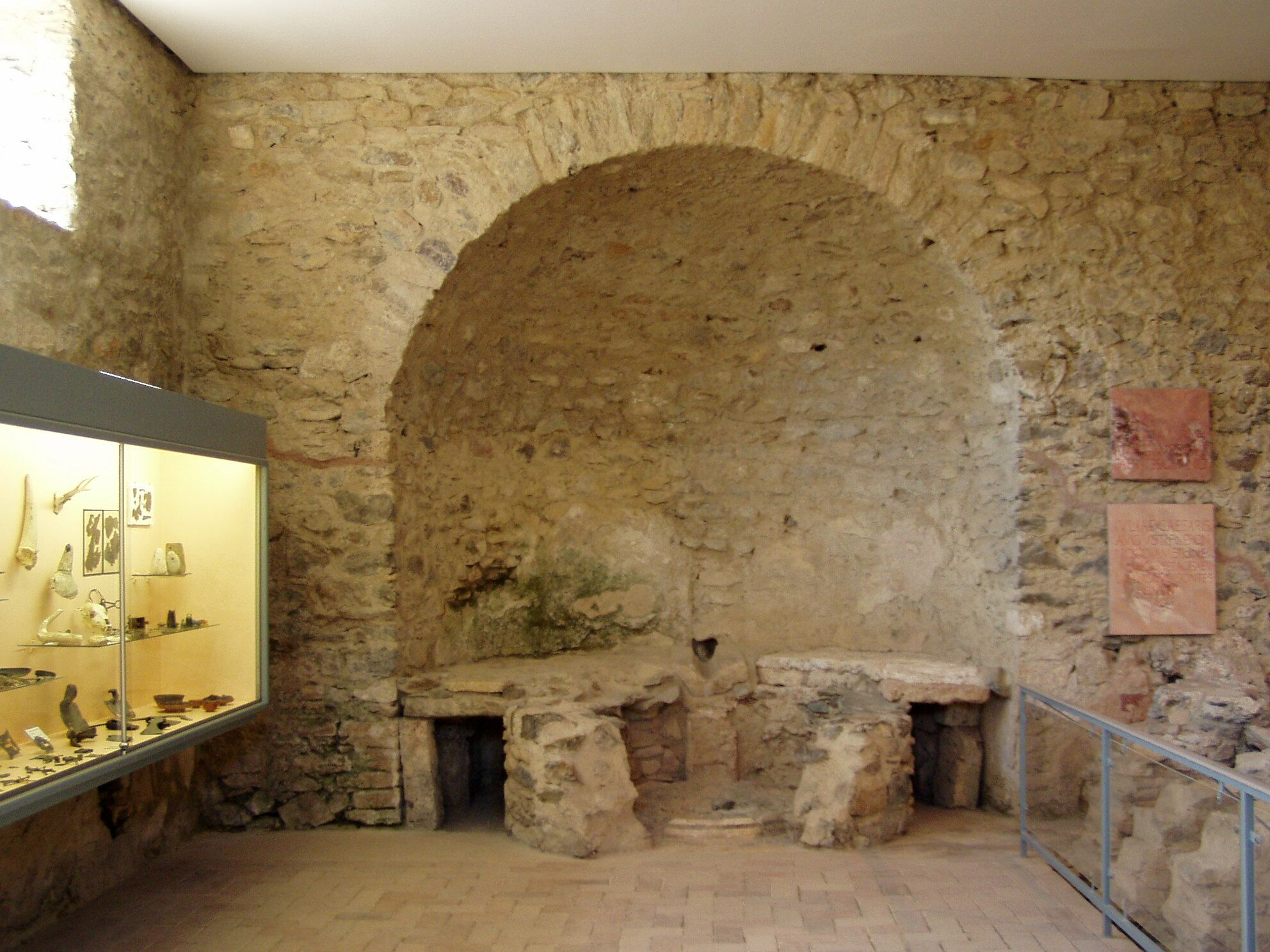
Apse in Room A of the Representation House; Remains of the water basin can be seen

The residential and workshop district, known as the NG buildings, was located along the hillside to the east of the Merchant's Forum. Here large workshops for processing non-ferrous metals were situated. Excavations have uncovered corresponding smelting furnaces, as well as here produced cauldrons, buckets, bottles, pots, and brooches in native design.

The houses are arranged in several terraces, on the lowest terrace there are also residential buildings. The well-preserved house NG/33 consists of multiple rooms. The bedroom had a terrazzo floor, while the living room had a niche stove. The non-load-bearing walls were made of half-timbering (opus craticium), wickerwork threw with mortar.

At the highest point on the edge of the hollow, along the ancient road to the east, stood the double gate. It was built in the Tiberian period (after 14 AD) when the entire city center was redesigned. Since the settlement continues east of the gate, it is not a city gate but probably a representative building.

=== AA Buildings ===
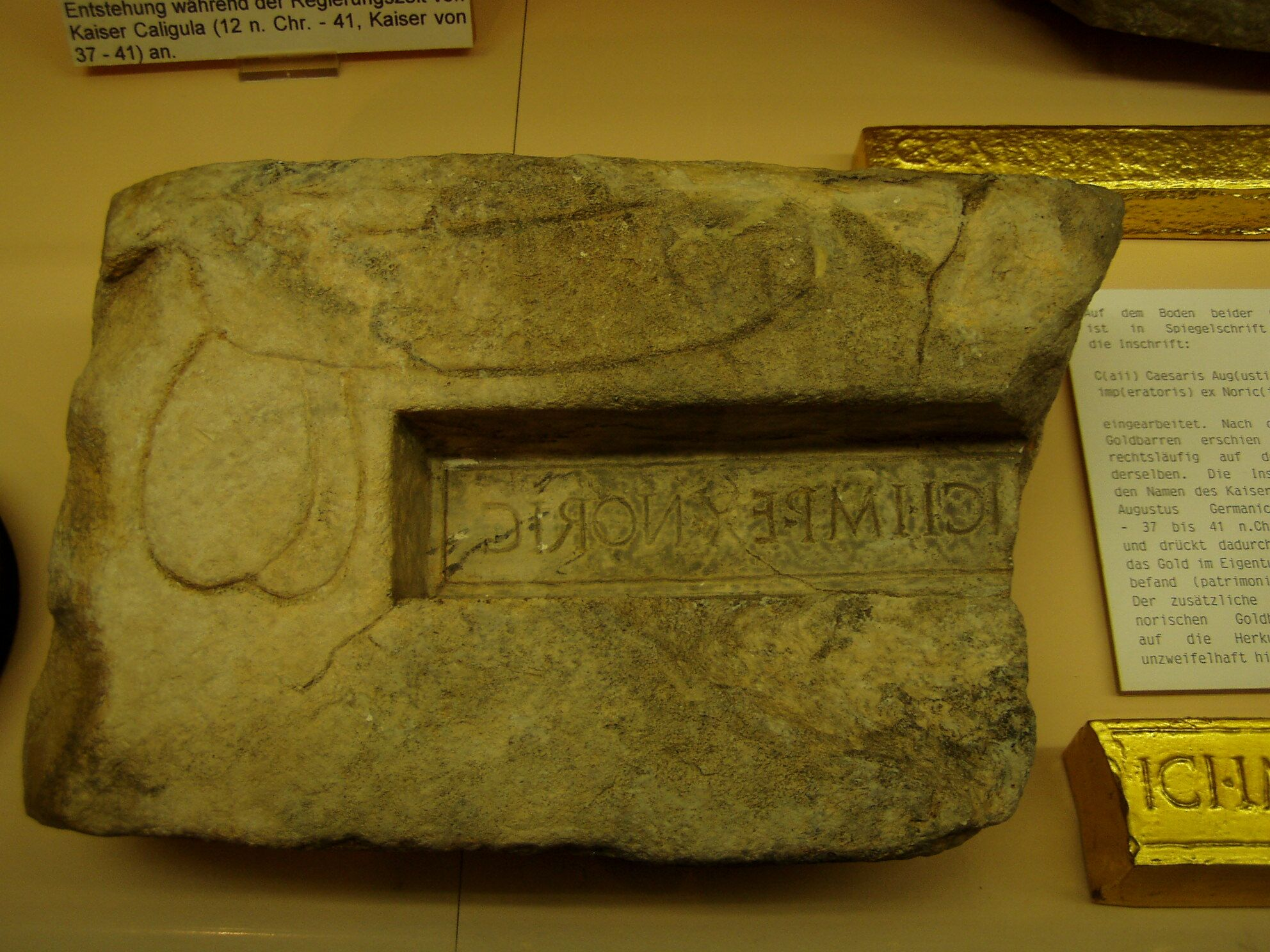
Mold from the gold melt

These buildings are located below the road that cuts through the excavation site and also served as a roadway at that time. Here is a large building that includes a large six-room bathing area, a large bakery, a large kitchen, and a 19 × 24 m courtyard (peristyle). This building was built in Tiberian-Claudian times on older, tavern-like predecessors.

To the east, the lower AA buildings extend across three terraces. Some of them are two-story, elongated structures with ridge heights of up to 15 meters. The imperial gold smelter was established in these buildings under Emperor Caligula. Excavations found two gold ingot molds and rock crystals weighing 50 to 50 kg. Within two rooms, surrounded by walls up to 13 meters high and accessible only via a wooden staircase, the remains of 19 gold smelting furnaces were uncovered. The gold processed here originated from the Gastein Tauern. Adjacent to this room was a storage hall (AA/44) with a vault-like chamber (Thesauros, AA/45).

=== Construction ===
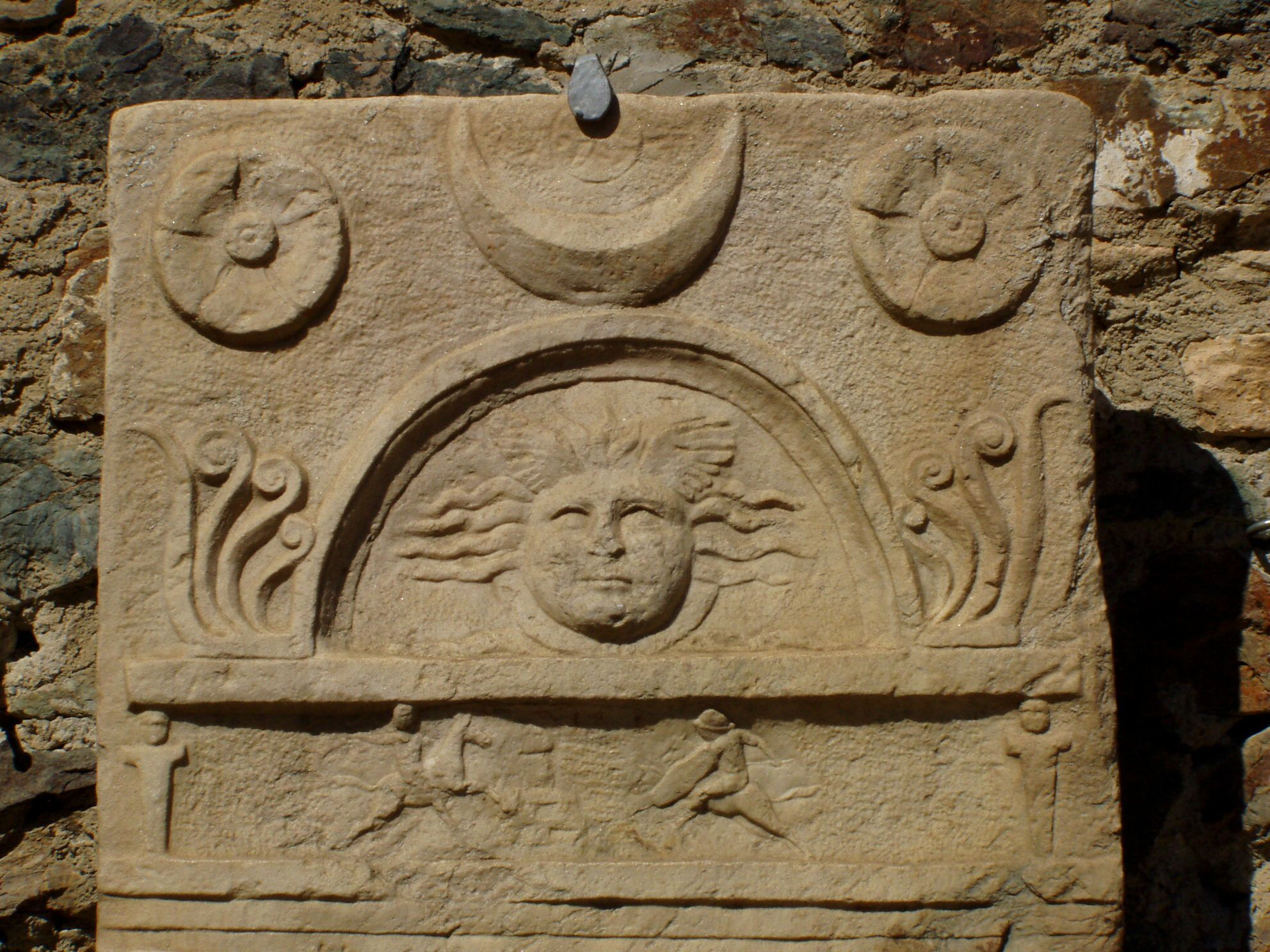
Marble funerary stele of Gaius Vettius

The majority of the walls were built using the opus incertum method. It involved connecting outer layers of irregular rubble stones with an inner core of concrete mixed with rock fragments, slag, and charcoal residues. The stones for the buildings were mostly sourced from the site itself, while others came from quarries on the north side of the mountain. These stones were mainly Ordovician tuffs/tuffites and basalts, making up about 95 percent of the material. A 6 × 10 m water basin below the bathhouse was constructed using cast masonry (opus caementicium). In Room A of the Representation House, the concrete floor was reinforced with iron bars made of Ferrum Noricum. This construction, dating back to around 15 AD, represents the oldest known use of steel in concrete floors.

Tombstones and official buildings were adorned with marble. However, only a small portion of the cladding remains today, as it was likely repurposed for the construction of Virunum. Initially, lower-quality marble from nearby sources was used for the grave stelae. As prosperity grew, marble from quarries in Gummern, Krastal, and even as far as 50 km away from the Spitzelofen quarry (measured in a straight line) was utilized.

The Magdalensberg site shows a scarcity of fired roof tiles. Two explanations are considered: either the houses were solely covered with wooden shingles, or the existing roof tiles were repurposed for the construction of Virunum.

=== Mural paintings ===
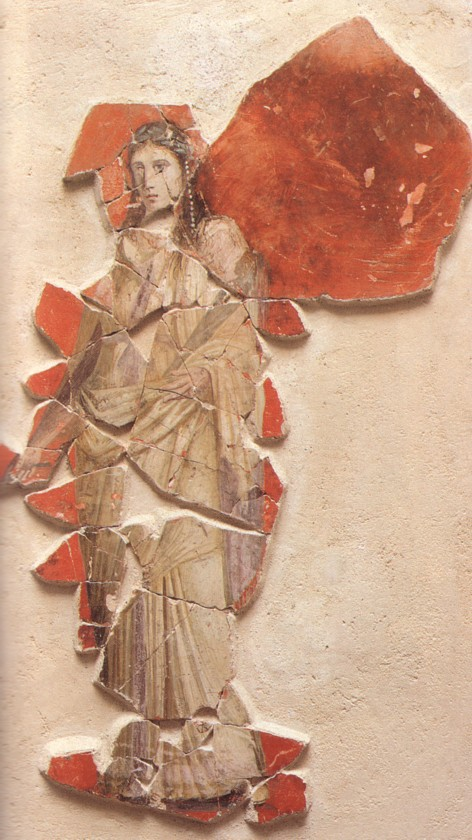
Iphigenia Taurisca, part of the Bacchae frescoes from room AA/15

Several rooms in the city contained wall paintings that were created over approximately 80 years, from the late Caesarian to late Tiberian periods. However, there are no wall paintings from the last phase of the Claudian buildings due to their incomplete construction. The wall paintings exhibit strong stylistic similarities to the classical Italic South, indicating a high artistic quality and negating the classification of provincial art. The stylistic classification used for Pompeian frescoes can also be applied here, with the presence of the following styles:

- The simple second style, after the middle of the 1st century BC, is found approximately in the underground room OR/23. Four panels on the south and west walls have depictions of divine figures, including Athena with her shield and Aphrodite with the boy Eros. The representation of Aphrodite is a Greek artwork from shortly after the middle of the 1st century BC.
- Room K showcases the mature third style, which emerged during the time of Tiberius. The room features three reconstructed walls adorned with ten distinctively colored fields. A black-painted base strip runs along all the walls. The west wall is divided into three sections: the lateral white fields are bordered by dark red, while the central field displays a light red area against a sky-blue background. The upper portion of this central section displays a painted frieze depicting dolphins and golden shells. On the north wall, there are five panels alternating between white and yellow. The white panels are framed in yellow, while the yellow panels are bordered by dark red. The central white panel is accompanied by two columns with Ionic capitals and showcases a pediment adorned with an ornamental frieze. The east wall consists of two white fields framed in dark red. The upper closure of all three walls features a perspective-painted round-arched frieze supported by brackets. The spandrels of the frieze display bull skulls and sound basins.
- The frescoes recovered in fragments from the rubble in room AA/15 and reassembled in the Iphigenia complex also date back to this period. The painter is presumed to be a master from the Hellenized southeast of the Mediterranean who was skilled in Greek painting and poetry. The mythological figures depicted here are romantically refined. The arrangement of the figures in the room was reconstructed based on the shadows they cast. Several preserved or identified scenes include: Opposite the entrance to the room was a Hades featuring Theseus and Peirithoos in front of Persephone, where the two friends were being punished for their attempt to abduct Persephone from Hades. On the left wall, there was a shepherd scene: a naked youth plays the flute while a frowning older shepherd and sheep listen spellbound. In the foreground lies a pan flute, in the background a mountain god sits as a judge of the competition (Agon). Also on the left wall were three isolated figures: Dionysus and two dancing girls, who can be identified as Cassandra and Ino. The representation of Dionysus corresponds to the Bacchae of Euripides. On the right wall was Iphigenia with open hair, a laurel wreath, a golden necklace, and in her hand a greenish idol, the statue of Artemis.

== Archaeological Park Magdalensberg ==
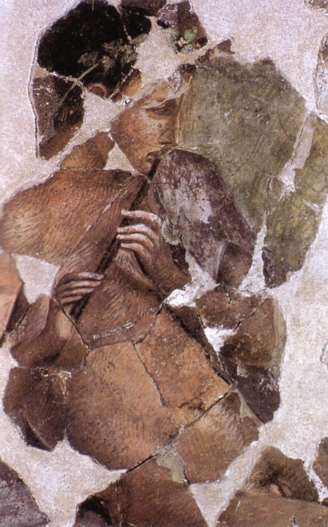
Shepherd playing flute from room AA/15

The settlement decayed very quickly after the abandonment and fell into oblivion. However, the earlier settlement was known at the latest since the discovery of the Youth of Magdalensberg. in 1502. The location of the church directly above a Celtic shaft suggests a continuous use of the summit as a sanctuary. The first excavations took place in the mid-19th century. Since 1948, annual excavation campaigns have been carried out, during which the buildings, most of which are now accessible in the form of an open-air museum in the forum area, were excavated, preserved, and partly rebuilt. The Magdalensberg Archaeological Park is a branch of the State Museum of Carinthia.

The tour of the Archaeological Park follows 11 stations:

- Dealer forum and dealer district
- Murals
- Residential/Museum Education
- Workshop Quarter
- Double gate
- Temple district
- Praetorium, Basilica
- House of Representatives
- Lapidarium
- Terrace houses with bathroom
- Gold ingot foundry
