= Youth of Magdalensberg =

Ancient Roman statue

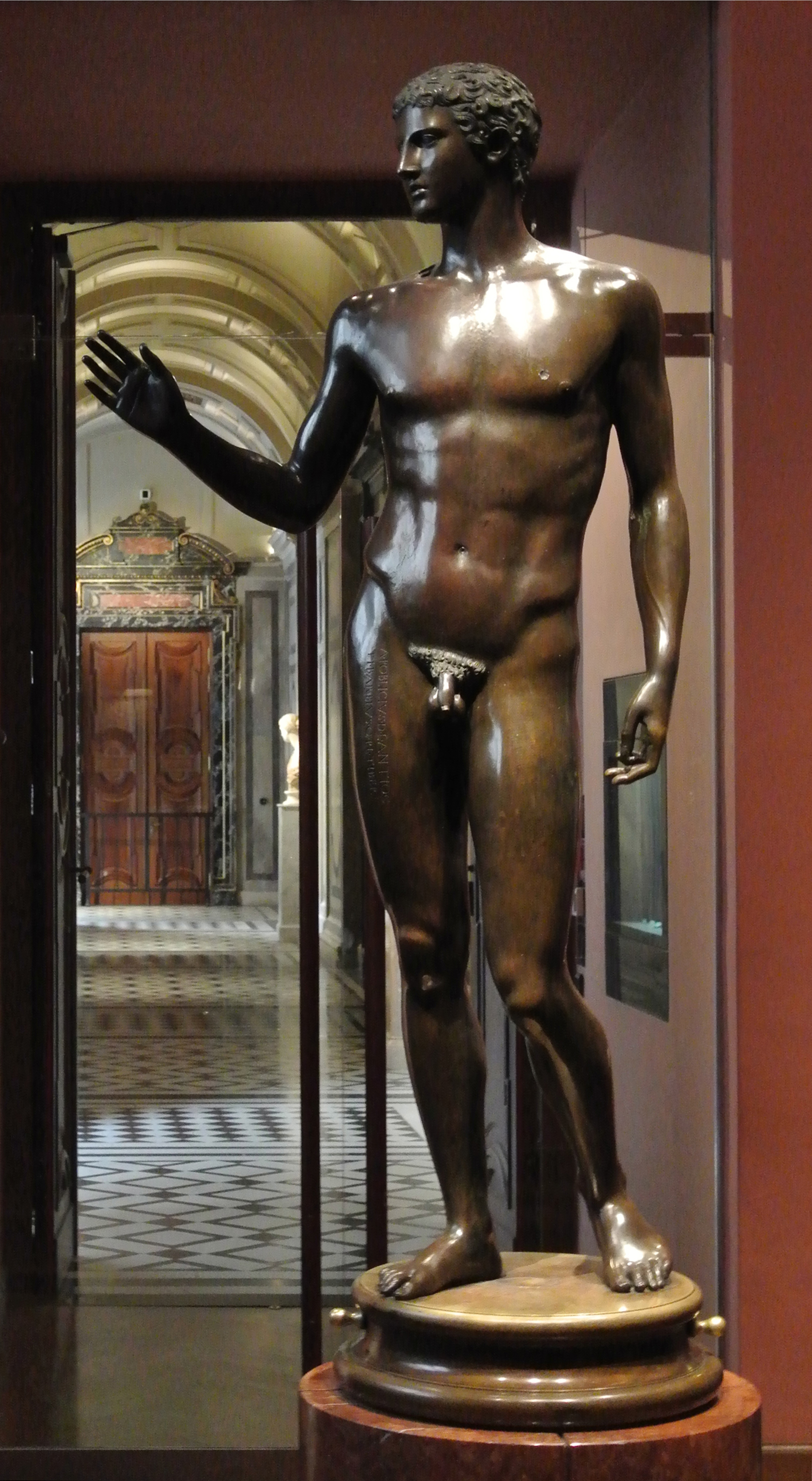
The Youth of Magdalensberg in the Kunsthistorisches Museum, Vienna

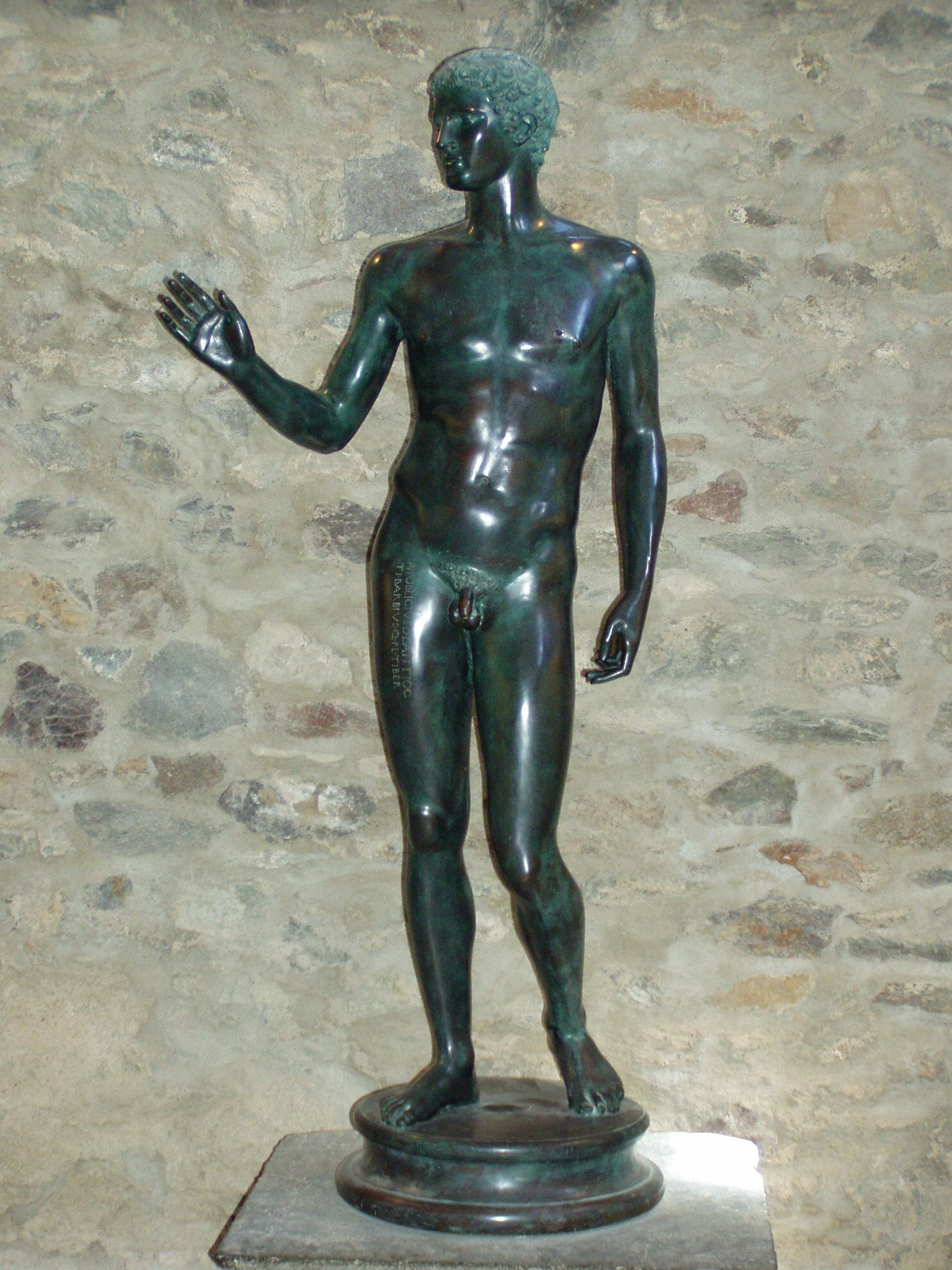
Copy in the collection of the Landesmuseum Kärnten at Magdalensberg

The Youth of Magdalensberg was an ancient Roman bronze statue dating to the first century BC, missing since approximately 1810 and now presumed lost, that was discovered in 1502 at the Carinthian mountain Magdalensberg, once a major late Celtic and early Roman city of Noricum. It is known today primarily from a sixteenth-century cast now held at the Kunsthistorisches Museum, Vienna (Inventory # VI 1), which until 1986 was mistakenly regarded as the original.

Until the twentieth century, the statue was also known as the Youth of Helenenberg from the old name for Magdalensberg. The youth is the only ancient full-size bronze statue known from the Eastern Alpine region and therefore is of great significance in Austria.

== Description ==
The bronze statue shows a naked youth standing still, of about life size (1.85 metres high, 6'1"). In its contrapposto stance, the right leg is load-bearing, while the left is free, barely touching the ground with its toes. The left arm hangs free, the right hand is held out at shoulder height. The head is turned slightly to the right, following the gesture of the right hand.

An inscription is incised on the right thigh:

A[ulus] Poblicius D[ecimi] l[ibertus] Antio[cus]
Ti[berius] Barbius Q[uinti] P[ublii] l[ibertus] Tiber[inus or -ianus]
(A[ulus] Poblicus Antio[chus], fr[eedman] of D[ecimus]; Ti[berius] Barbius Tiber[inus or ianus], fr[eedman] of Q[uintus] P[ublius].)

This is the dedication of two freedmen, who were probably active in the Stadt auf dem Magdalensberg as merchants.

A gilt round shield found together with the Youth, which is now lost, bore this inscription:

M. Gallicinus Vindili f[ilius] L[ucius] Barb[ius] L[ucii] l[ibertus] Philoterus pr[ocurator] / Craxsantus / Barbi[i] P[ublii] s[ervus].
(M[arcus] Gallicinus, son of Vindilus; L[ucius] Barb[ius] Philoterus, fr[eedman] of L[ucius]; Craxsantus, s[lave] of Barbi[us] P[ublius])

The donors of the shield, therefore were a free Celt, a freedman of the North Italian Gens Barbia and local Celtic slave of the same family. One of the two donors of the Youth itself was also from this family.

== Significance ==
An identification as the image of a god cannot be made on the basis of the statue itself or the inscription. Therefore, there are a variety of interpretations. These range from athlete, through torchbearer (Lychnophoros), to various divinites. The round shield offers no further help.

Recent interpretations see the statue as the cult statue of a Celtic Mars from the sanctuary on the mountaintop, or as a priest of Noreia, or as part of a statue group dedicated to Noreia, or as a statue of Mercury which stood in the town's forum.

== Classification ==
The statue is an eclectic work of Roman idealised sculpture and was made in the first half of the first century BC. Its model was the Greek sculptures of the fifth and fourth centuries BC. Probably it is a copy of a work from the school of Polykleitos.

== Provenance ==
The statue was found in 1502 by a farmer beside the river on a terrace south of the mountaintop. It came into the possession of Matthäus Lang von Wellenburg, the Bishop of Gurk and a humanist soon afterward. He took it with him to Salzburg in 1519 when he became Archbishop of Salzburg. Until the 1980s it was assumed that the statue had come from Salzburg to Vienna in 1806 following the Peace of Pressburg. However, investigations of the casting technique and scientific analysis of the metal in 1986 led to the realisation that the statue in Vienna is a cast made in the sixteenth century.

The fate of the original is not known with certainty. As documents of the Salzburg cathedral chapter reveal, it came into the possession of Emperor Ferdinand I in 1551, after which a cast had been made, which remained in Salzburg and came to Vienna in 1806. The original was moved to Spain, where it is attested in the gardens of the Royal Palace of Aranjuez in 1662 and 1786. From the beginning of the nineteenth century, the location of the original statue is unknown.

Two illustrations of the original are known. The first comes from Peter Apian and Bartholemew Amand's Inscriptiones Sacrosanctae Vetustatis of 1534, the other from a fresco of Hans Bocksberger der Ältere in the chapel aisle of the Landshut Residence from 1542.
