= Noreia =

Ancient lost city in the eastern Alps

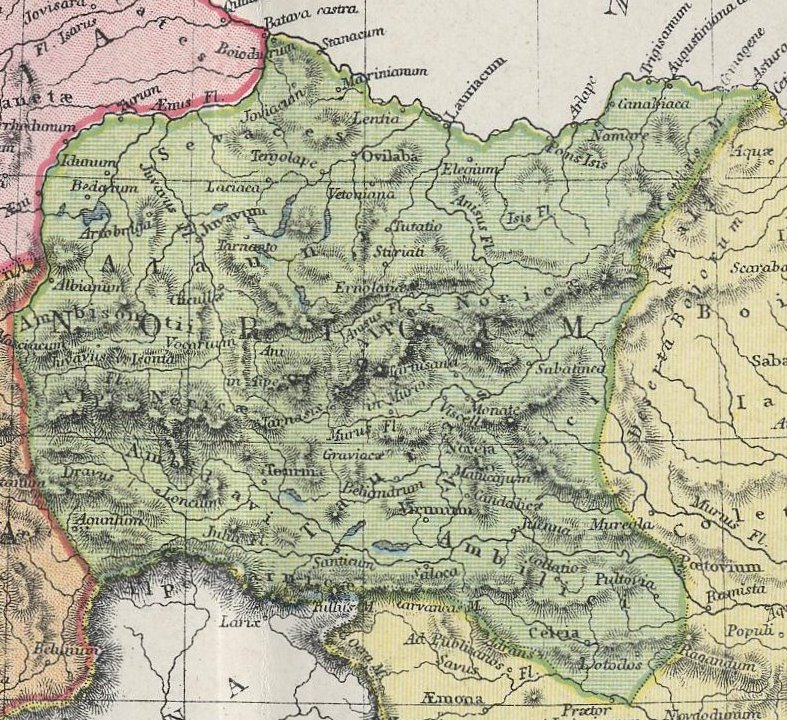
Roman province of Noricum, 1907 map

Noreia is an ancient lost city in the Eastern Alps, most likely in southern Austria. While according to Julius Caesar it is known to have been the capital of the Celtic kingdom of Noricum, it was already referred to as a lost city by Pliny the Elder (AD 23 – AD 79). The location of Noreia has not been verified by modern researchers.

== Relevance ==
The kingdom of Noricum was a major provider of weaponry for the Roman armies from the mid-Republic onwards. Especially the Roman swords were made of the best-quality steel then available, the chalybs Noricus, from this region. The strength of iron is determined by its carbon content. The wrought iron produced in the Greco-Roman world generally contained only minimal traces of carbon and was too soft for tools and weapons. It thus needed to be carburised to at least 1.5% carbon content. The main Roman method of achieving this was to repeatedly heat the wrought iron to a temperature of over 800 C (i.e. to "white heat") and hammer it in a charcoal fire, causing the iron to absorb carbon from the charcoal. This technique had been developed empirically, as there is no evidence that ancient iron producers understood the chemistry involved. The rudimentary methods of carburisation used rendered the quality of the iron ore critical to the production of good steel. The ore needed to be rich in manganese (an element which remains essential in modern steelmaking processes), but also to contain very little, or preferably zero, phosphorus, whose presence would compromise the steel's hardness. The ore mined in Carinthia (S. Noricum) fulfills both criteria to an unusual degree. The Celtic peoples of Noricum (predominantly the Taurisci tribe) empirically discovered that their ore made superior steel around 500 BC and established a major steel-making industry around it. At Magdalensberg, a major production and trading centre was established, where a large number of specialised blacksmiths crafted a range of metal products, especially weapons. The finished products were mostly exported southwards, to Aquileia, a Roman colony founded in 180 BC.

From 200 BC onwards, it appears that the tribes of Noricum were gradually united in a native Celtic kingdom, known to the Romans as the regnum Noricum, with its capital at this uncertain location called Noreia. Noricum became a key ally of the Roman Republic, providing a reliable supply of high-quality weapons and tools in return for Roman military protection. Although there was no formal treaty of military alliance, the Norici could count on Roman military support, as demonstrated in 113 BC, when a vast host of Teutones invaded Noricum. In response to a desperate appeal by the Norici, the Roman consul Gnaeus Papirius Carbo rushed an army over the Alps and attacked the Germans near Noreia (although, in the event, he was heavily defeated).

== Location ==
The Greek chronicler Strabo (64/63 BC – c. AD 24), as well as the Roman historian Appian (c. AD 95 – c. AD 165), report on the "Battle of Noreia" in 113 BC between a Roman army under consul Gnaeus Papirius Carbo and Cimbri and Teutoni tribes. It is not known whether the location of the battle and the capital of Noricum are the same city. Nevertheless, based on ancient distance specifications, 18th-century publications located Noreia near Murau or Neumarkt in Styria, which, however, has been continually put into question. Upon excavations in Sankt Margarethen near Mühlen in Styria, the residents in 1930 even changed the name of the village to Noreia, though further research showed that the finds are the remains of a medieval settlement.

As the handed-down distance from Aquileia – 1,200 stadia – more likely indicate a place in present-day Carinthia, several scholars assume that Noreia can be identified with excavated Celtic-Roman settlements on the Magdalensberg or in the nearby Zollfeld plain. Other theories assume a location in the Carinthian Glan valley at a sanctuary of the local mother goddess Noreia near Liebenfels, erected in the 2nd century AD. Other localisation attempts include the ancient Gurina settlement near Dellach or the ore mining area of Hüttenberg. Another possibility, favoured today, is the Gracarca mountain beside Lake Klopein in Carinthia, where a prehistoric hilltop settlement and several graves of Celtic princes have been found.

It is also possible that there is more than one location named "Noreia", which possibly just denotes a "Noric city". There seem to be two identical entries in the Tabula Peutingeriana, a 12th-century copy of a Late Roman road map. On the map an older Noreia, about 3.5 km in diameter, and a new city of the same name, measuring 7.5 by 3.4 km, can be found in the region of modern Styria. It is more probable, though, that the double entry of a Roman station called Noreia is a copyist's error.

== Literature ==
- Karin Erika Haas-Trummer, Noreia. Von der fiktiven Keltensiedlung zum mittelalterlichen Adelssitz. Eine historische und archäologische Spurensuche bis 1600, Wien - Köln - Weimar 2007.
- Stefan Seitschek, "Noreia - Viele Antworten, keine Lösung", Keltische Forschungen 3 (2008), 221-244.
