= Virunum =

Roman settlement

Coordinates: 46°41′57″N 14°21′54″E

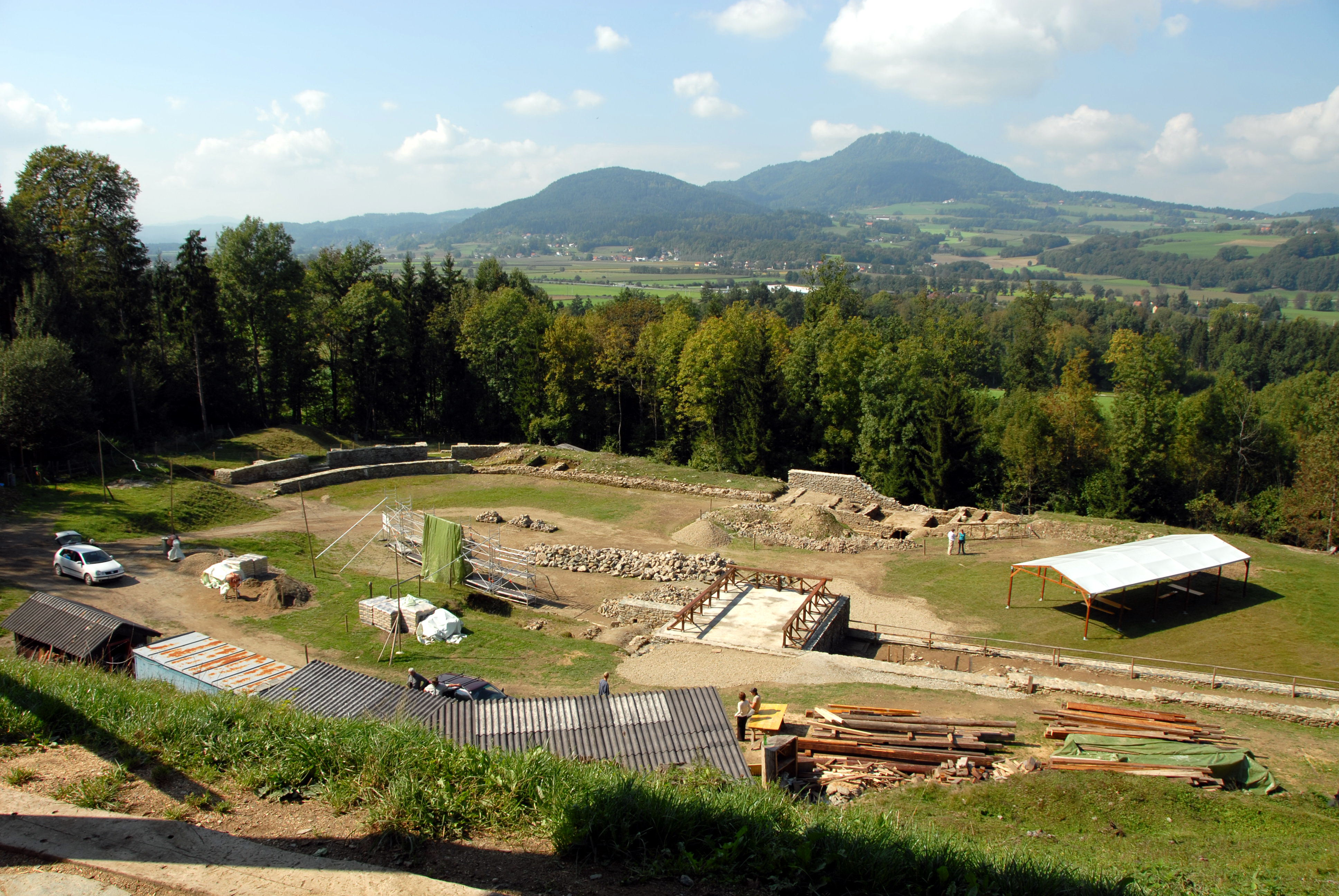
Virunum's Amphitheatre, southern part, near Maria Saal, with Zollfeld and Ulrichsberg

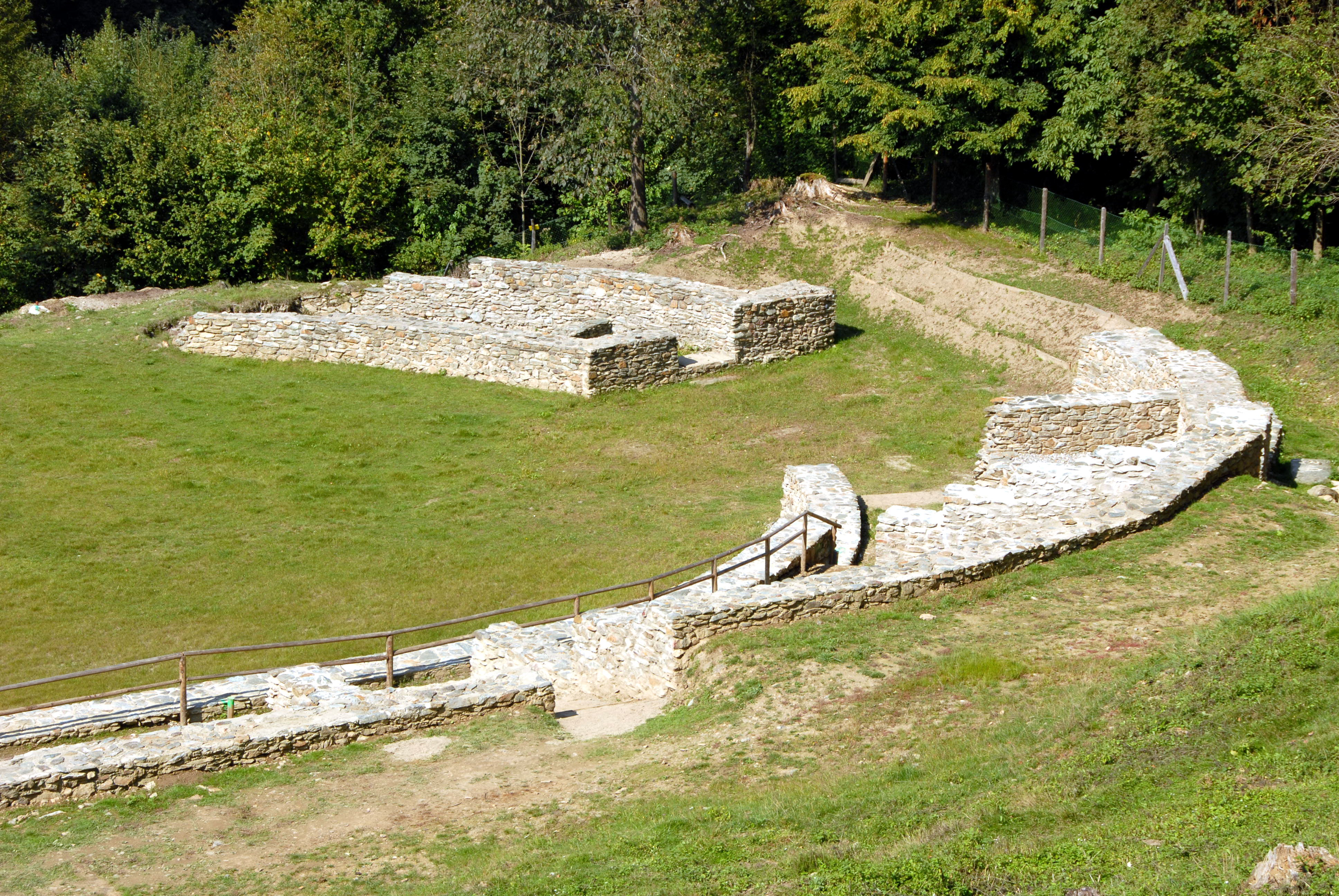
The Amphitheatre of Virunum, northern part

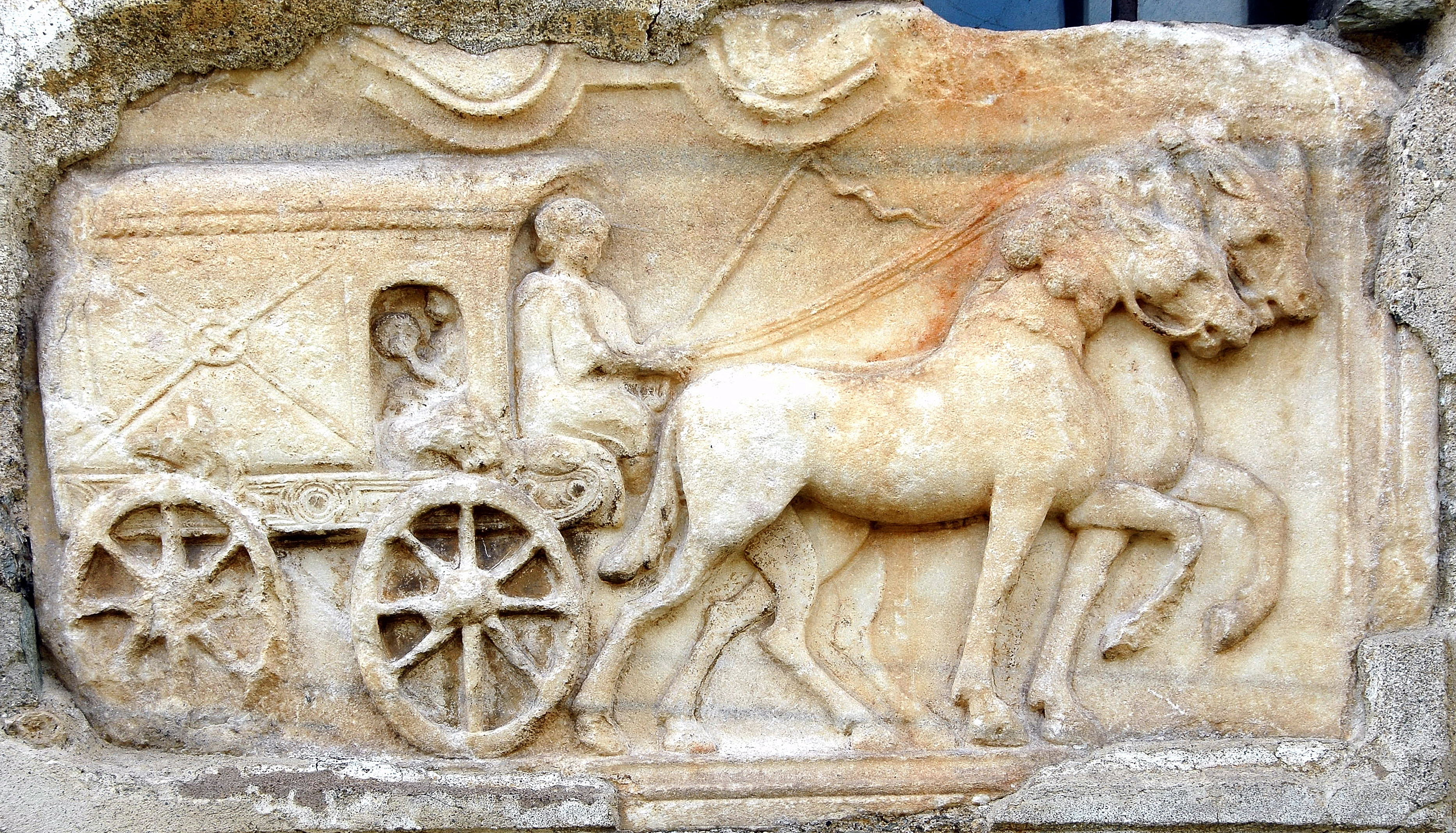
Carriage (to the underworld?) from a Roman tomb at Virunum. Today on the south wall of Maria Saal village church

Claudium Virunum was a Roman city in the province of Noricum, on today's Zollfeld in the Austrian State of Carinthia. Virunum may also have been the name of the older Celtic-Roman settlement on the hilltop of Magdalensberg nearby. Virunum (Virunensis) is today a Catholic titular see.

== History ==
Municipium Claudium Virunum, or simply, Virunum, was founded under Emperor Claudius as the capital of the province of Noricum succeeding the town upon the hilltop of Magdalensberg, perhaps also taking its name from that settlement, which is widely believed to have been the royal capital city of the pre-Roman Celtic kingdom of Noricum, a town whose name is, as yet, not known. The new Roman foundation was situated on the main route from the Adriatic to the Danube, with a branch through south eastern Carinthia connecting Virunum with the Amber Road. Established on a flood-proof terrace on the edge of Zollfeld parts of the city stretched as far as Töltschach Hill in the east.

The city had the Latin Right and was the seat of the provincial governor (procurator Augusti provinciae Norici) till the middle of the 2nd century. After the Marcomannic Wars (which the Romans called bellum Germanicum) the administration of the province was moved to Ovilava, today's Upper Austrian town of Wels, but the administration of the province's finances remained in Virunum. When Emperor Diocletian split the large province of Noricum, Virunum became the capital of the province of Noricum mediterraneum.

From AD 343 Virunum is known to have been a bishop's see. Little is known about the decline of the city. Being unfortified and situated in a flat valley, during the Migration Period (the "Barbarian Invasions") the city was probably partly or totally evacuated by its inhabitants, who left for the surrounding hills such as Ulrichsberg or Grazerkogel. In the 5th century there is mention of Teurnia in western Carinthia near today's town of Spittal an der Drau as the capital town of Noricum.

The territory administered from Virunum comprised central and lower Carinthia as well as parts of Styria and covered an area of about 9,000 square kilometres (3,500 sq mi). The usual authorities such as city council, magistrate and dual mayorship ("II viri iure dicundo") are known in part by name.

== Description ==
The city proper covered an area of about one square kilometre (0.39 sq mi). Excavations were first undertaken in the second half of the 18th and the beginning of the 19th centuries, yet documentation is poor. Extensive and systematic excavations took place from end of the 19th century until 1931. Further excavations were not undertaken until the end of the 20th century culminating in the excavation of the amphitheatre.

The city's layout is that of a checkerboard, with the main axis running SSW–NNE, along which the Forum and the Capitolium with two adjacent blocks to the west have been excavated. A Dionysus-mosaic of almost 30 square metres (320 sq ft) was discovered. The city's streets were not fortified, but the sewage system, lead pipes and public water places are proof of a fine water supply and disposal.

== Sanctuaries and secular public buildings ==
Apart from the city capitol, a Dolichenum for the military god Jupiter Dolichenus was excavated, inscriptions have been discovered proving the existence of two Mithraea, and in 1999 two votive relief plates were found from a Nemesis temple near the amphitheatre. Proof of an early Christian church, whose existence had been presumed for a long time, has recently been found in the northern section of the city.

A proper Roman theatre with a stage, the only one known in all Noricum, as well as elliptic amphitheatre were situated on the slope of Töltschach Hill. A large building further east is believed to have been the palace of the Praeses or provincial governor.

== Modern use ==
During the summer months, the amphitheatre is regularly used for historical reenactments, including staged gladiator combats, which have taken place since 2020 in cooperation with the Carinthian State Museum (Landesmuseum Kärnten) and with the participation of the association INDES Kärnten, a group dedicated to Historical European martial arts.

== The "Prunnerkreuz" ==
Several Roman stone slabs from Virunum have been incorporated in the Prunnerkreuz ("Prunner's Cross"), a small shrine from 1692 at the northern limits of the city. Johann Dominikus Prunner was the Secretary to the Estates of the Duchy of Carinthia and a private archaeologist.

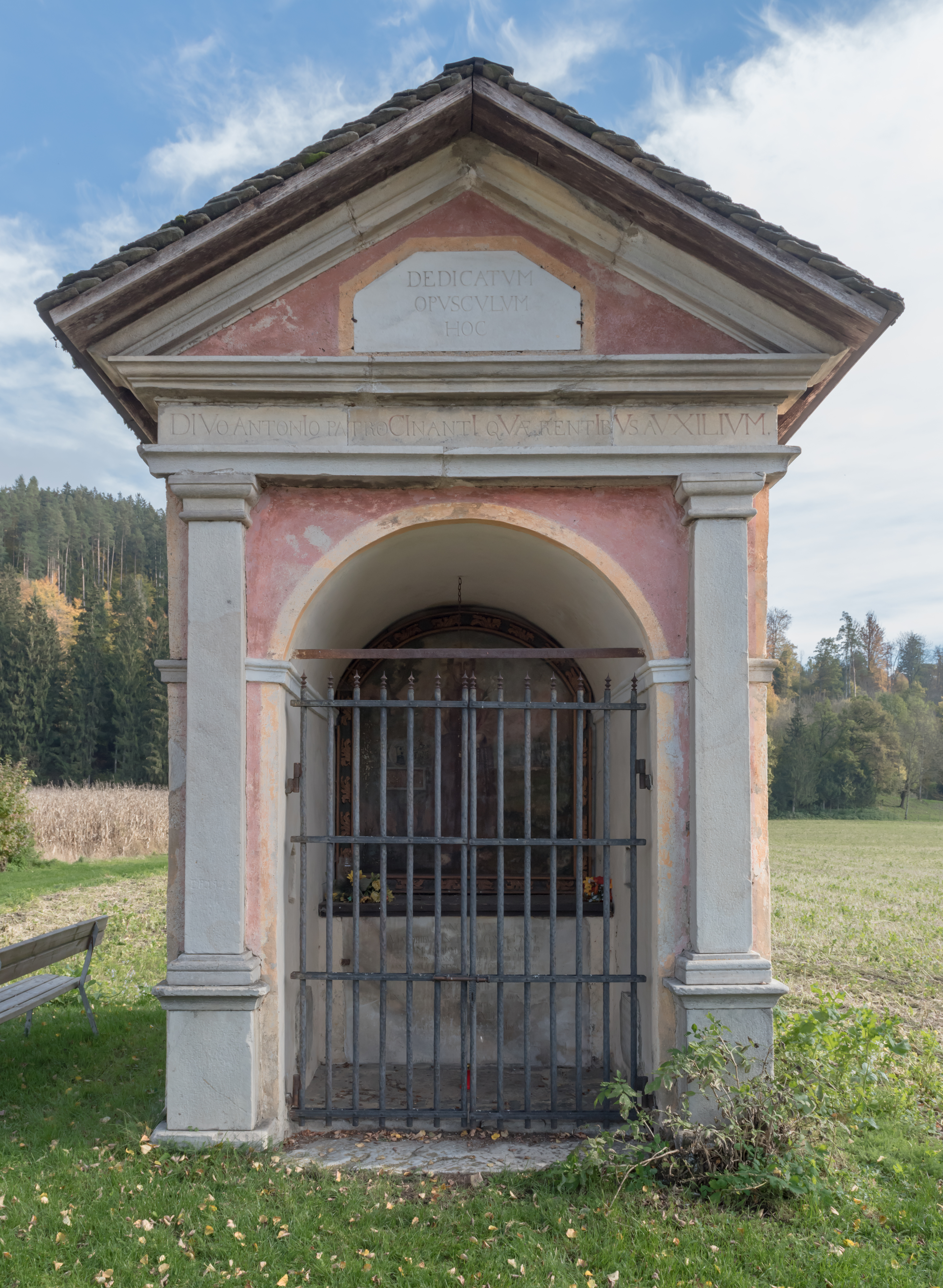
Prunnerkreuz sanctuary of 1692 incorporating Roman and Celtic slabs

Believing the city's name to have been Sala, from which name nearby Maria Saal's name was supposedly derived, Prunner had a medallion stele put in the southern wall of the sanctuary on which he had the inscription added HIC LOCVS EST UBI SALA STETIT – PENETRARE VIATOR (This is the Place where Sala once was. Wanderer, step inside). Other Virunum stones integrated are

- A stele from the middle of the 1st century AD is in memory of one C. Iulius Censo and his spouse Iulia Privata.
- The inscription from a tomb of c. 200 for one T. Accius Marcus, his wife Saturnina and their son Accius Maximus, soldier in the Signal Corps of the Legio II Italica.
- Two Early-Christian pilaster capitals were, until recently, the only evidence for an Early-Christian church in Virunum.
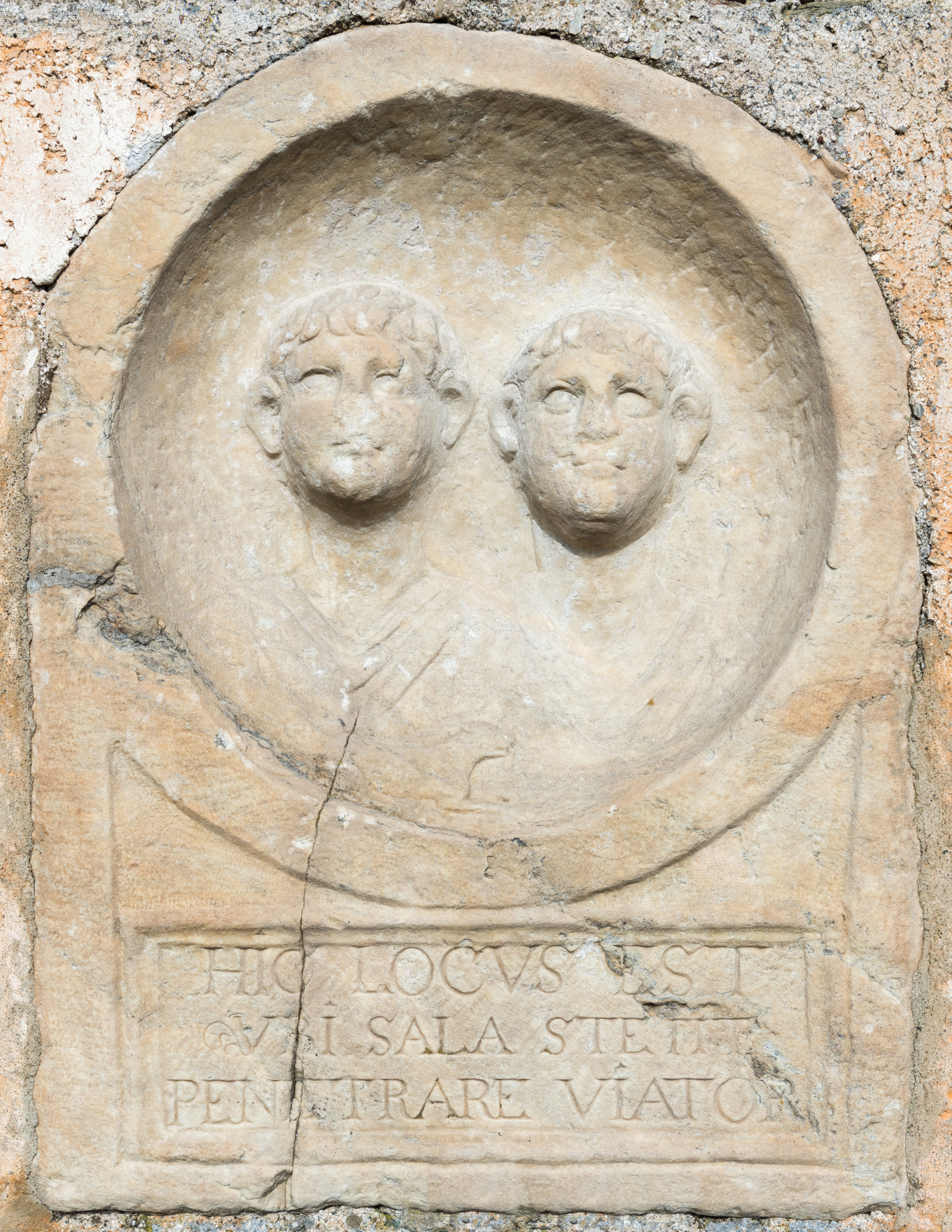
Medallion with Prunner's inscription

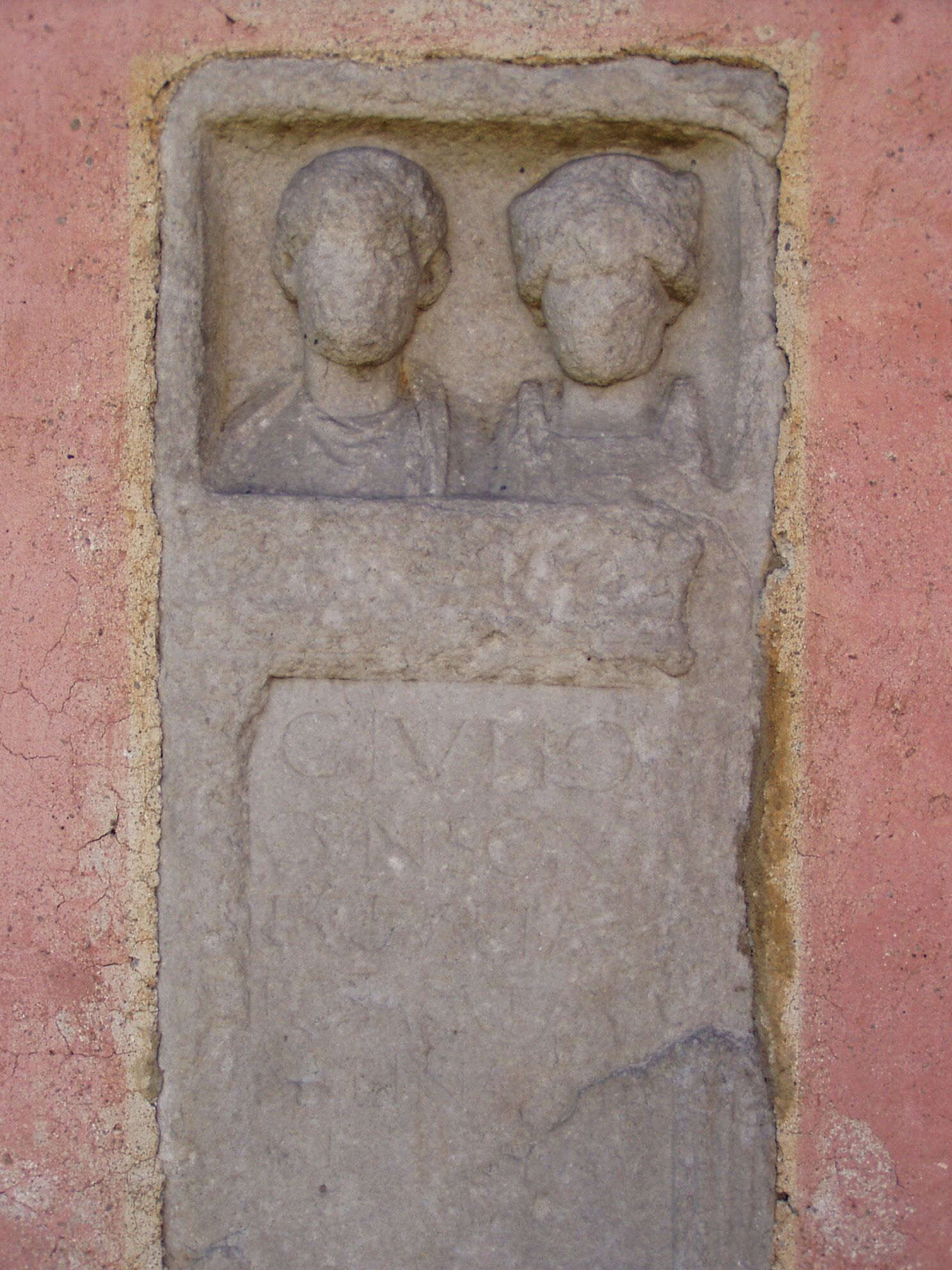
Stele in memory of C. Iulius Censo and Iulia Privata

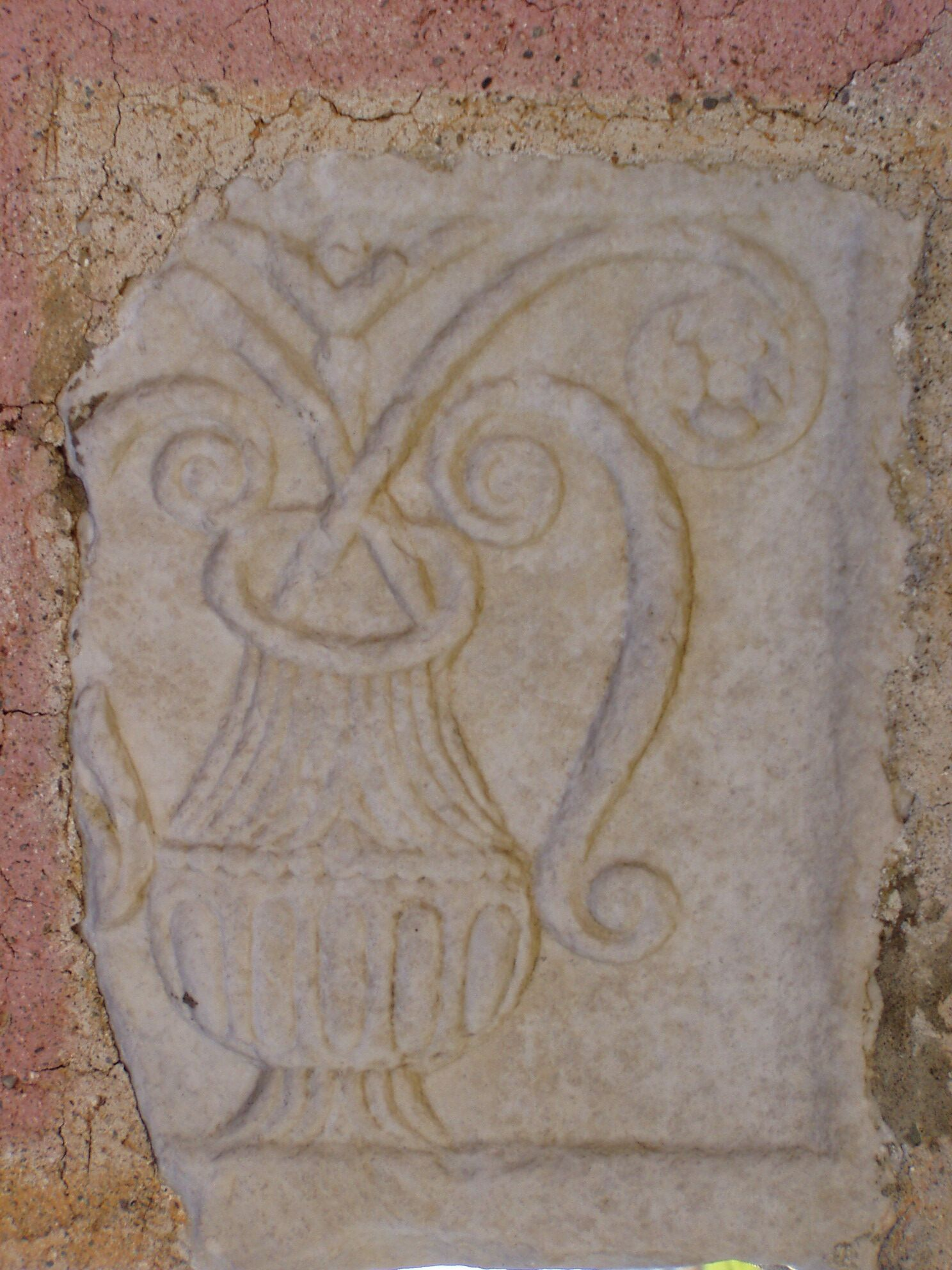
Ornamental slab

== Titular archbishops of Virunum ==
- Giuseppe Zabkar, (born 24 December 1914 – 19 May 1984), Titular Archbishop of Virunum 1969–1984, Pro-Nuntius in Iceland and Finland
- Antonio Mattiazzo, (born 20 April 1940 in Rottanova di Cavarzere), Titular Archbishop of Virunum 1985–1989, Nuntius to Ivory Coast and Pro-Nuntius to Burkina Faso and Niger 1985–1989, since 1989 Archbishop of Padua
- Oscar Rizzato, Papal Almoner of the Pope Emeritus of the Office of Papal Charities (23 Dec. 1989–28 July 2007), Titular Archbishop of Virunum since 23 December 1989, born 8 February 1929 at S. Giorgio delle Pertiche (Italy), ordained priest: 4 July 1954, consecrated bishop: 6 January 1990
- Fermín Emilio Sosa Rodríguez, archbishop designate

== See also ==
- Stadt auf dem Magdalensberg

== Literature ==
- Barley, Maurice Willmore, European towns: their archaeology and early history, New York: Academic Press for the Council for British Archaeology, 1977 ISBN 0-12-078850-0
- Beck, Roger, Qui Mortalitatis Causa Convenerunt: The Meeting of the Virunum Mithraists on June 26, A.D. 185 In: Beck on Mithraism: collected works with new essays, Farnham, Surrey: Ashgate Publishing, Ltd., 2004 ISBN 0-7546-4081-7
- Fuchs, Manfred, Virunum, Archaeologie Alpen-Adria, vol. 3, Klagenfurt 1997 (German)
- Glaser, Franz, Kelten-Römer-Karantanen, Klagenfurt: Geschichtsverein für Kärnten, 1998. (German)
- Harl, Ortolf, Der Stadtplan von Virunum nach Luftaufnahmen und Grabungsberichten. In: Jb. RGZM 36, 1989, 2, 521 ff. (city map, German)
- Piccottini, Gernot, Mithrastempel in Virunum, Klagenfurt: 1994 ISBN 3-85454-078-7 (German)
- Piccottini, Gernot, Die Römersteinsammlung des Landesmuseums für Kärnten, Klagenfurt: Verlag des Landesmuseums für Kärnten, 1996 (German)
- Piccottini, Gernot, Die Römer in Kärnten, Klagenfurt: Carinthia, 1989, pp. 168–183. ISBN 3-85378-333-3 (German)
