= Magdalensberg =

- Municipality
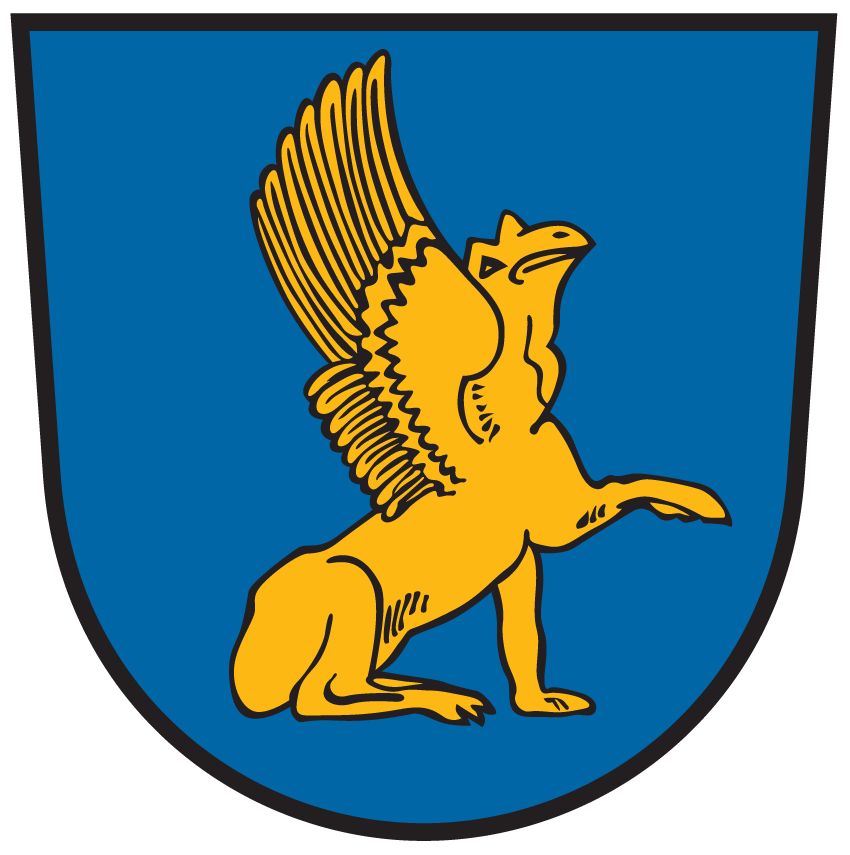
- Coat of arms

- Location within Austria
- Coordinates: 46°42′N 14°26′E
- Country: Austria
- State: Carinthia
- District: Klagenfurt-Land

Government
  - Mayor: Andreas Scherwitzl

Area
  - Total: 42.9 km^{2} (16.6 sq mi)
- Elevation: 450 m (1,480 ft)

Population (2018-01-01)
  - Total: 3,455
  - Density: 80.5/km^{2} (209/sq mi)
- Time zone: UTC+1 (CET)
  - Summer (DST): UTC+2 (CEST)
- Postal code: 9064
- Area code: 04224

Magdalensberg (Slovene: Štalenska gora) is a market town in the district of Klagenfurt-Land in Carinthia in Austria.

== Geography ==
Magdalensberg lies at the foot of the Magdalensberg in the Klagenfurt basin in the lower Gurk valley. The Gurk and the Raba flow through the municipality.

The municipality comprises 40 villages and hamlets:
Christofberg, Deinsdorf, Dürnfeld, Eibelhof, Eixendorf, Farchern, Freudenberg, Gammersdorf, Geiersdorf, Göriach, Gottesbichl, Großgörtschach, Gundersdorf, Haag, Hollern, Kleingörtschach, Kreuzbichl, Kronabeth, Lassendorf, Latschach, Leibnitz, Magdalensberg, Matzendorf, Ottmanach, Pirk, Pischeldorf, Portendorf, Reigersdorf, Schöpfendorf, Sillebrücke, St. Lorenzen, St. Martin, St. Thomas, Stuttern, Timenitz, Treffelsdorf, Vellach, Wutschein, Zeiselberg, Zinsdorf.
and is composed of 13 cadastral subdivisions ("Katastralgemeinden"): Zinsdorf, Reigersdorf, Ottmanach, Wutschein, Gammersdorf, Schurianhof, Timenitz, Vellach, Freudenberg, Portendorf, Zeiselberg, Lassendorf, St. Thomas All the villages have also Slovenian names.

== Name ==
The municipality took its name ("Magdalene's Mountain") from the mountain on its territory, which is renowned for the extensive Celtic settlement on the hilltop, which was probably the royal capital of the Celtic kingdom of Noricum. The excavations that have been going on for a century now have, however, so far not brought to light any traces of the Celtic town. This might be due to the fact that the excavations were focussed on the spectacular centre of the settlement, which was obviously completely "upgraded" by the Romans from about 50 BC onwards, before they started on building the municipium of Virunum, the new capital of the Roman Province of Noricum at the foot of the mountain. The Celtic settlement's name is still unknown. For a while it was assumed to be the Noreia of ancient sources, then this idea was rejected, and now the archaeologists in charge of the excavations think that the Roman city of Virunum had probably been given the name of its Celtic hilltop predecessor.

== Youth of Magdalensberg ==
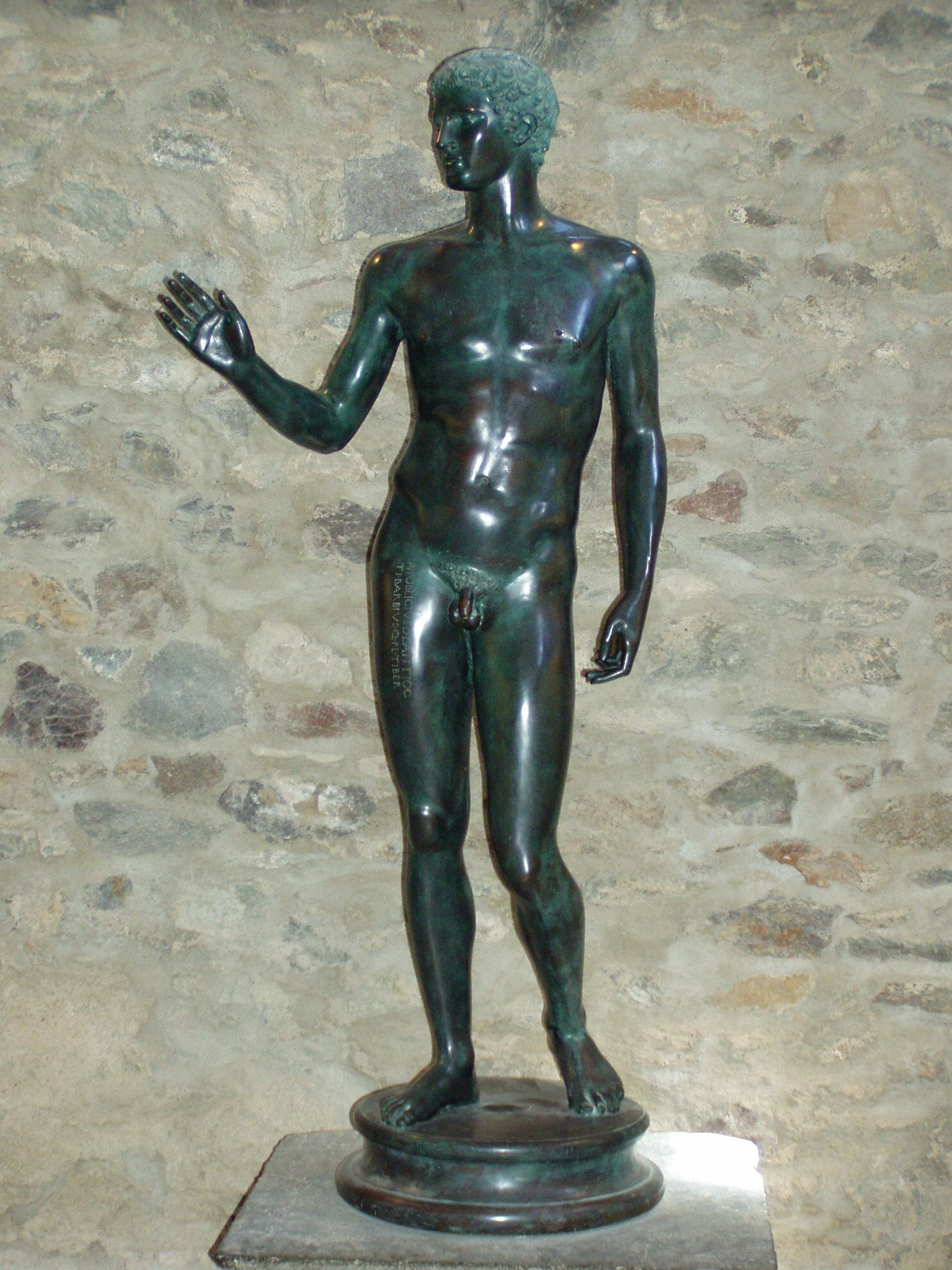
The Youth of Magdalensberg, originally a Celto-Roman piece of art

The most spectacular find was made as early as 1502: a perfect statue of a young man. The beautiful "Jüngling vom Helenenberg", so named after the mountain's name at that time which was Helenenberg, was a European sensation and as the finest example of Greek sculpturing in the monarchy has found its way into the Vienna Museum of Art. For tourism's sake the young man was renamed "Jüngling vom Magdalensberg" and copies of the statue can now be seen both in the Magdalensberg museum and in Klagenfurt. The "original" was then identified as a Roman copy of a Greek original of the 5th century BC; recently, however, it turned out to be an early Renaissance copy of an original Roman copy of the Greek original both of which had gone lost, yet their beauty has been preserved.

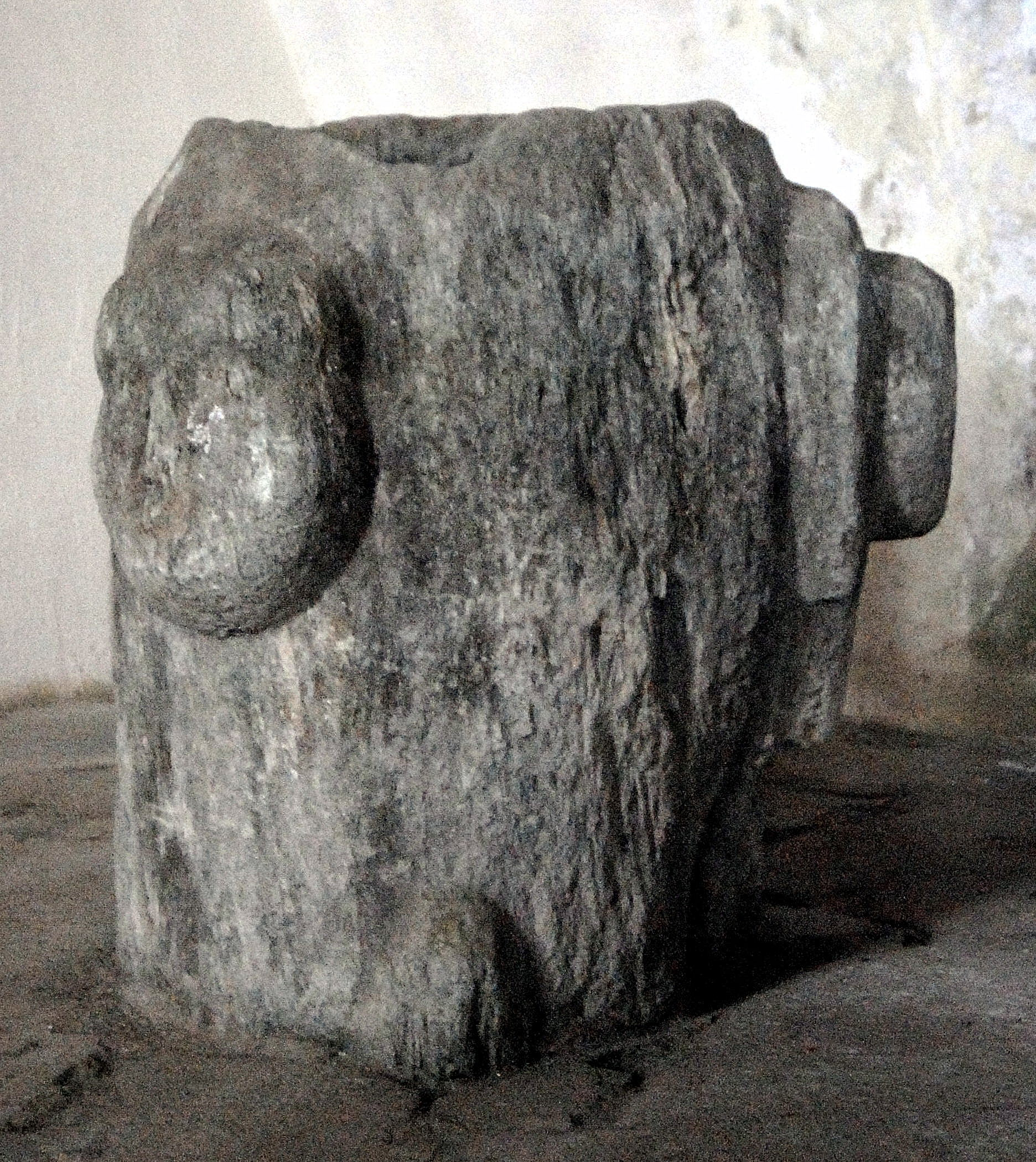
Three headed stone from Magdalensberg, said to be an inculturation of the Slavic divinity Triglav

== Roman Empire ==
According to Barry Cunliffe, Noricum was from the time of the Roman Republic a friendly ally of Rome. Trade between the two states was intense, particularly from Noricum's iron, gold, and agricultural produce. "The adjacent trading centre of Magdalensberg consisted of two elements, a native oppidum on the summit of the mountain and a Roman trading colony below. The oppidum was the principal administrative centre of the kingdom and the residence of the royal Noricum family, and as such provided a natural focus for Roman merchants. The Roman colony developed on a south-facing terrace below the oppidum. The earliest buildings were of timber and can be dated to c. 100 BC but by 30 BC the traders' houses were built in stone and were decorated with murals depicting classical mythological scenes painted by immigrant Roman artists. The focus of the colony was a large open forum where the commercial transactions would have been carried out. The Roman merchants who lived and worked here were representatives of the great business houses, mainly from Aquileia, and like all traders in foreign lands they surrounded themselves with the outward and visible signs of their own culture. The scale of the trade with Rome was considerable and acted as a spur to local production; it also introduced the Roman lifestyle to the natives who, over the decades, increasingly embraced Roman luxuries and Roman manners" (Cunliffe, 2001).

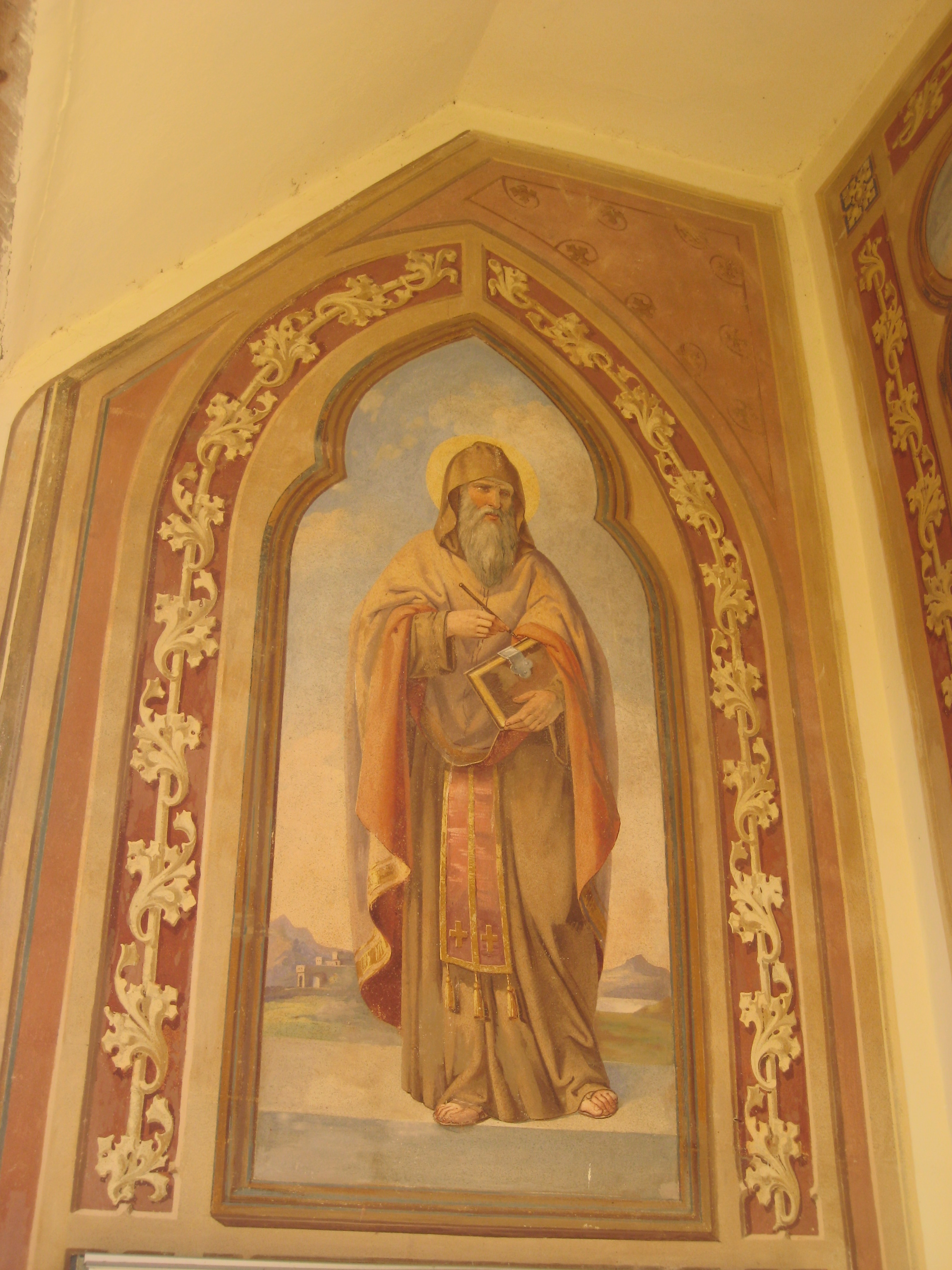
Saint Cyril, one of the major Slavic saints, symbol of Slovenes in the regions in the village of Saint Martin in Freudenberg

=== Slovenian cultural history ===
The area is also an important centre of the cultural and State history of the Slovenians. Numerous settlements emanate from the pre-feudal Slavic social structure, namely the so-called kosezi which were later named in German Edlinger. Those were the electors of the prince of the State of Carantania, whose centre was precisely nearby in the village of Karnburg (Slovenian: Krnski grad) in the valley of Zollfeld. The famous ritual departed from a village nearby the Municipality. In Thomas Jefferson's personal copy of Jean Bodin's Treatise on Republican Government (1576), Jefferson's initials appear next to the description of the ceremony. A myth has developed that this inspired Jefferson during the creation of the United States Declaration of Independence. However, there is no evidence for this theory and it has been dismissed by mainstream scholars.

The central mountain hill was also taken over by Slavs / Carantanians as a religious centre. Namely, Pavle Zablatnik, a local ethnologue, identified the pilgrimage on four hills departing of the peak of the Magdalensberg-mountain as being pre-christian, so it had to be first inculturated in to the Slavic culture before being practiced today. Also, the three headed stone of Magdalensberg is said to be a major example of early Slavic art from the 8th. to the middle of the 9th Century that represents at its perfection the process of Inculturation of the Slavic main divinity Triglav (the three headed god), as it would otherwise be destroyed during the early phase of christianization of the Slovenes. Numerous vestiges of Slovenian cultural history are still present, though the language became clearly a minority language.

== People ==
- Ottmanach, one of the constituent villages of the municipality, was the original home of the singer and light music composer Udo Jürgens.
- Zinsdorf, a municipality of Magdalensberg, was the birthplace of linguist Katja Sturm-Schnabl.

== See also ==
- Stadt auf dem Magdalensberg

== Literature ==
- Wilhelm Wadl: Magdalensberg: Natur – Geschichte – Gegenwart. Gemeindechronik. Verlag Johannes Heyn, Klagenfurt 1995, ISBN 3-85366-812-7.
- Wilhelm Wadl: Der Vierbergelauf. Geschichte – Sinngehalt – Ablauf. Klagenfurt 1985.
- Bojan-Ilija Schnabl: Celovško polje, neznani zaklad osrednje slovenske kulturne pokrajine, Izsledki enciklopedijskih raziskovanj. In: Koroški koledar 2013. Celovec 2012, 107–122.
- Bojan-Ilija Schnabl: Inkulturacija, fenomen kulturnih procesov. In: Studia Mitologica Slavica XV (Ljubljana 2012) 231–246. ISSN 1408-6271.
- Jean Bodin: Treatise on Republican Government, 1576
