= Noric steel =

Type of Celtic metal

Noric steel is a historical steel from Noricum, a kingdom located in modern Austria and Slovenia.

The proverbial hardness of Noric steel is expressed by Ovid: "...durior [...] ferro quod noricus excoquit ignis..." which roughly translates to "...harder than iron which Noric fire tempers [was Anaxarete towards the advances of Iphis]..." and it was widely used for the weapons of the Roman military after Noricum joined the Empire in 16 BC.

The iron ore was quarried at two mountains in modern Austria still called Erzberg "ore mountain" today, one at Hüttenberg, Carinthia and the other at Eisenerz, Styria, separated by c. 70 km (43 mi). The latter is the site of the modern Erzberg mine.

Buchwald identifies a sword of c. 300 BC found in Krenovica, Moravia as an early example of Noric steel due to a chemical composition consistent with Erzberg ore. A more recent sword, dating to c. 100 BC and found in Zemplin, eastern Slovakia, is of extraordinary length for the period (95 cm, 37 in) and carries a stamped Latin inscription (?V?TILICI?O), identified as a "fine sword of Noric steel" by Buchwald. A center of manufacture was at Magdalensberg.

== See also ==
- Bulat steel
- Crucible steel
- Damascus steel
- History of ferrous metallurgy
- Iron Age Europe
- Iron Age sword
- La Tène culture
- Tamahagane steel
- Toledo steel
- Wootz steel
