= Battle of Noreia =

Battle during the Cimbrian War (113 BCE)

- Part of the Cimbrian War
- The migrations of the Cimbri and the Teutons. Roman victories Cimbri-Teutonic victories
Date	113 BC
Location	Noreia, Noricum (precise location unknown)
Result	Cimbri-Teutonic victory

Belligerents
Roman Republic; Noricum	Cimbri; Teutons; Ambrones

Commanders and leaders
Gnaeus Papirius Carbo	Boiorix; Teutobod

Strength
30,000	300,000

Casualties and losses
24,000	Unknown, but light

The Battle of Noreia, in 113 BC, was the opening battle of the Cimbrian War fought between the Roman Republic and the migrating Proto-Germanic tribes, the Cimbri and the Teutons. It ended in defeat, and near disaster, for the Romans.

== Prelude ==
The Cimbri and Teutons left their home lands around the Baltic Sea in the Jutland peninsula and Southern Scandinavia. They travelled southeast and encountered the Scordisci, with whom they fought. Following their victory over the latter, they arrived at the Danube in Noricum (113 BC), which was home to the Taurisci, who were allied with Rome. Unable to repel these new invaders, the Taurisci appealed to Rome for assistance. The consul Gnaeus Papirius Carbo responded the following year, leading the legions into Noricum, where he took up a position on the heights near Aquileia.

== Battle ==
Carbo ordered them to vacate the territory of the Taurisci at once. The Cimbri had heard many stories from other tribes about the fearsome power of Rome, and after seeing the size of the Roman army and the strength of its position, they complied. However, Carbo was not going to allow enemies of Rome – nor an opportunity to gain a triumph – to escape. The guides he sent to escort the Cimbri and Teutons to the frontier were instructed to lead them into an ambush the consul had prepared. But somehow, perhaps due to being warned by their scouts or spies or possibly due to the treachery of one of the guides, the Cimbri became aware of Carbo's plan and, according to Theodor Mommsen:

An engagement took place not far from Noreia in the modern Carinthia, in which the betrayed gained the victory over the betrayer and inflicted on him considerable loss; a storm, which separated the combatants, alone prevented the complete annihilation of the Roman army.

== Aftermath ==
Carbo managed to escape with his life and the remnants of his army (though the Germanic tribesmen had erroneously thought and boasted that they had caught and slain their betrayer). He was later prosecuted for his failure by Marcus Antonius, rather than accepting exile, Carbo committed suicide. Rome prepared for the worst, but instead of invading Italy, the Cimbri and Teutons headed west, towards Gaul. There, in 105 BC, at the Battle of Arausio, the Cimbri and Teutons would again defeat a Roman army.
