= Noricum =

Historical region in modern Austria

Province of Noricum Provincia Noricum
- Province of the Roman Empire
- 16 BC – 476
- The province of Noricum in 125, in the reign of emperor Hadrian
- Capital: Virunum
- Historical era: Antiquity
  - Incorporated into the province: 16 BC
  - Divided to Noricum Ripense and Noricum Mediterraneum: c. 296
  - Odoacer's conquest and incorporated with his Italian Realm: 476
Preceded by
Kingdom of Noricum
Succeeded by
Noricum Ripense
Noricum Mediterraneum
Kingdom of Italy

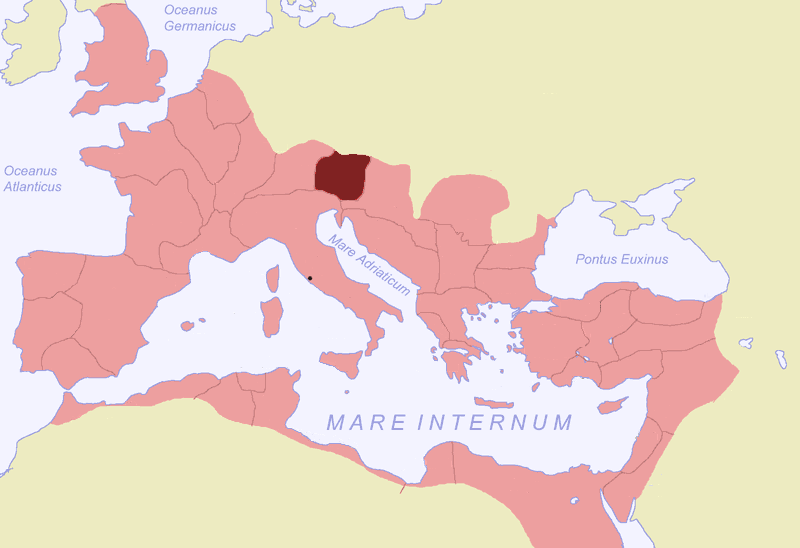
Roman province of Noricum highlighted

Noricum (/ˈnɒrɪkəm/) is the Latin name for the kingdom or federation of Celtic tribes that included most of modern Austria and part of Slovenia. In the first century AD, it became a province of the Roman Empire. Its borders were the Danube to the north, Raetia and Vindelici to the west, Pannonia to the east and south-east, and Italia (Venetia et Histria) to the south. The kingdom was founded around 400 BC, and had its capital at the royal residence at Virunum on the Magdalensberg.

== Area and population ==
Around 800 BC, the region was inhabited mostly by the people of the Hallstatt culture. Around 450 BC, they merged with the people of other areas in the south-western regions of Germany and eastern France.

The country is mountainous and rich in iron and salt. It supplied material for the manufacturing of arms in Pannonia, Moesia, and northern Italy. The famous Noric steel was largely used in the making of Roman weapons. Gold and salt were found in considerable quantities. The plant called saliunca (the wild nard, a relative of the lavender) grew in abundance and was used as a perfume according to Pliny the Elder.

The inhabitants developed a culture rich in art, salt mining, cattle breeding, and agriculture. When part of the area became a Roman province, the Romans introduced water management and the already important trade relations between the people north and south of the Alps increased.

Archaeological research, particularly in the cemeteries of Hallstatt, has shown that a vigorous civilization was in the area centuries before recorded history. The graves contained weapons and ornaments from the Bronze Age, through the period of transition, up to the Hallstatt culture, i.e., the fully developed older period of the Iron Age.

== Language ==
The Noric language is attested in only fragmentary inscriptions, one from Ptuj and two from Grafenstein, neither of which provide enough information for any conclusions about the nature of the language.

== History ==
=== Steel for Roman weaponry ===
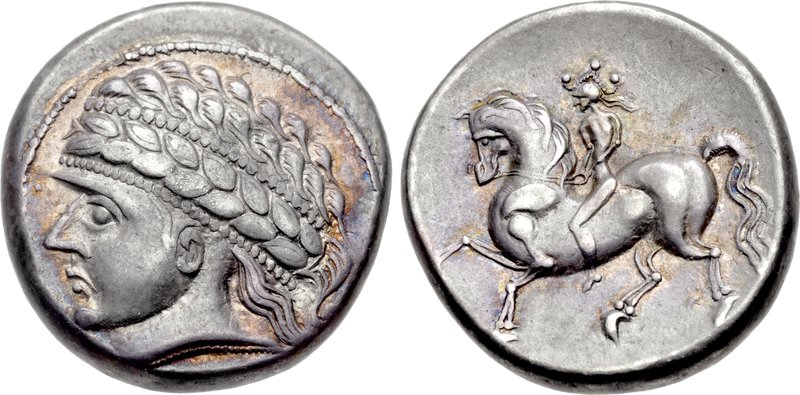
Coin of Noricum, mid-2nd century BC

The kingdom of Noricum was a major provider of weaponry for the Roman army from the mid-Republic onwards. Roman swords were made of the best-quality steel then available from this region, the chalybs Noricus. The strength of steel is determined by its composition and heat treatment. The wrought iron produced in the Greco-Roman world was too soft for tools and weapons. Ore from Noricum, by contrast, could yield a superior product. The ore needed to be rich in manganese (an element which remains essential in modern steelmaking processes), and contain little or no phosphorus, which weakens steel. The ore mined in Carinthia (S. Noricum) fulfilled both criteria particularly well. The Noricum discovered their ore made superior steel around 500 BC and built a major steel industry.

At Magdalensberg, a major production and trading centre, specialised blacksmiths crafted metal products and weapons. The finished arms were exported to Aquileia, a Roman colony founded in 180 BC.

From 200 BC, the Noricum tribes gradually united into a kingdom, known as the Regnum Noricum, with its capital at a place called Noreia. Noricum became a key ally of the Roman Republic, providing high-quality weapons and tools in exchange for military protection. This was demonstrated in 113 BC, when Teutones invaded Noricum. In response, the Roman consul Gnaeus Papirius Carbo led an army over the Alps to attack the tribes at the Noreia.

=== Roman rule ===
Noricum was incorporated into the Roman Empire in 16 BC. For a long time previously, the Noricans had enjoyed independence under princes of their own and carried on commerce with the Romans. In 48 BC they took the side of Julius Caesar in the civil war against Pompey. In 16 BC, having joined with the Pannonians in invading Histria, they were defeated by Publius Silius Nerva, proconsul of Illyricum. Thereafter, Noricum became a Roman province. It was not until the reign of Antoninus Pius that the Second Legion, Pia (later renamed Italica) was stationed in Noricum, and the commander of the legion became the governor of the province.

Under Diocletian (245–313), Noricum was divided into Noricum ripense ("Noricum along the river", the northern part southward from the Danube), and Noricum mediterraneum ("landlocked Noricum", the southern, more mountainous district). The dividing line ran along the central part of the eastern Alps. Each division was under a praeses, and both belonged to the diocese of Illyricum in the Praetorian prefecture of Italy. It was in this time (304 AD) that a Christian serving as a military officer in the province suffered martyrdom for the sake of his faith, later canonised as Saint Florian.

The Roman colonies and chief towns were Virunum (near Maria Saal to the north of Klagenfurt), Teurnia (near Spittal an der Drau), Flavia Solva (near Leibnitz), Celeia (Celje) in today's Slovenia, Juvavum (Salzburg), Ovilava (Wels), Lauriacum (Lorch at the mouth of the Enns, the ancient Anisus).

Knowledge of Roman Noricum has been decisively expanded by the work of Richard Knabl, an Austrian epigrapher of the 19th century.

The transition from Roman to barbarian rule in Noricum is well documented in Eugippius's Life of Saint Severinus, providing material for analogies for this process in other regions where primary sources from the period are lacking.

== In modern politics ==
In 1919, Heinrich Lammasch, the last prime minister of Imperial Austria, proposed to give the young republic the name of Norische Republik or Noric Republic, because the ancient borders were similar to those of the new state, which—at the time—did not wish to be considered the heir of the Habsburg monarchy, but an independent, neutral and peaceful state.

== Episcopal sees ==
Episcopal sees of Noricum that are now listed in the Annuario Pontificio as titular sees include:

- Aguntum
- Virunum

== See also ==
- List of Roman governors of Noricum
- Varisci
- Aetius campaign in the Alps

== General and cited references ==
- Alföldy, Géza. Noricum. Routledge & K. Paul, 1974.
- Fischer, Thomas. Noricum. Mainz: Zabern, ISBN 3-8053-2829-X.
- Healy, John F., Mining and Metallurgy in the Greek and Roman World, Thames and Hudson, 1978.
- Strobel, Karl (2012): "Das Regnum Noricum, die sogenannte Norische Münzprägung und Rom: Frühe Kontakte als Vorspiel von Annexion und Romanisierung – Fiktion oder Realität? Mit einem Appendix zur Noreia-Frage" in "Archaeologia Austriaca" Vol. 96. pp. 11–34
