= Gold of Tolosa =

Treasure seized by Roman conquerors of Gaul

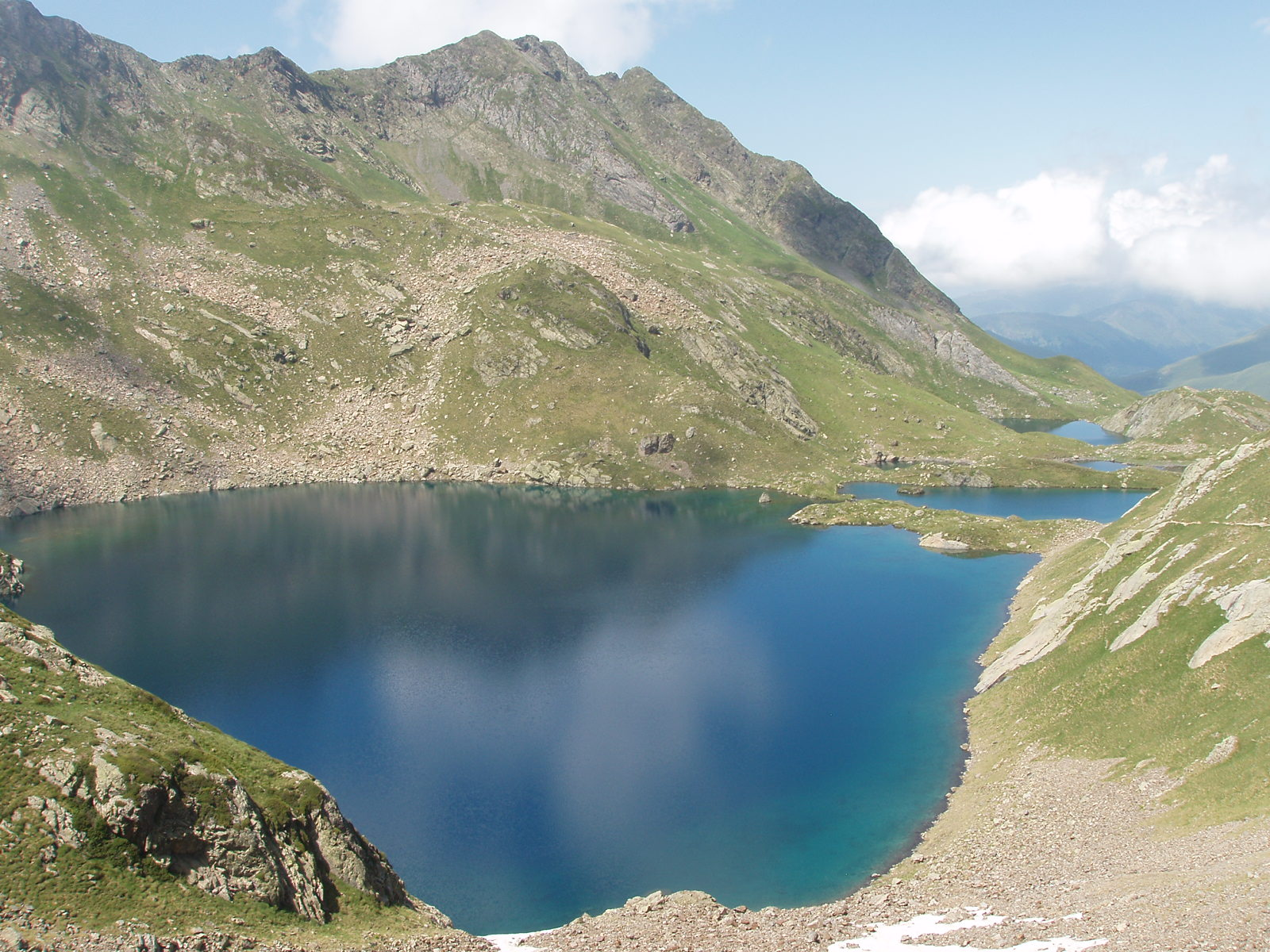
Boums Lake in Haute-Garonne, one of the many lakes near Toulouse suspected to have held the 'cursed' riches

The Gold of Tolosa (also the aurum Tolosanum) was a treasure hoard seized by the ancient Roman proconsul Quintus Servilius Caepio from the Volcae town of Tolosa, modern-day Toulouse.

Near-contemporary Cicero briefly mentioned it in his philosophical dialogue De Natura Deorum, referencing political scandal in the late Roman Republic with the line "Consider other judicial inquiries, the one in reference to the gold of Tolosa, and the one on the Jugurthine conspiracy..." The treasure itself was discussed by several ancient historians, including Strabo and Cassius Dio.

== Greek origins of Gallic treasure ==
The course of Volcae tribal migration throughout the 3rd centuries BC, noting the destination of some Tectosages and the Arecomisci to the area around Tolosa

In a fragment from Cassius Dio's work, the historian asserted that the Gold of Tolosa had its origins in the Gallic invasion of Greece under Brennus.

In 280 BC, a great army of Gallic warriors invaded Macedon and central Greece. According to Pausanias, the Gauls were motivated by a desire for plunder. The success of the expedition was rich enough to prompt Brennus, who had been one of the leaders of the 280 BC expedition, to persuade the Gallic tribes to launch another invasion. Brennus convinced the Gauls that the relative Greek weakness at the time and the great wealth of the Greek cities and temple sanctuaries were opportunities to be exploited. Strabo relates that the Volcae Tectosages were believed to have been amongst the tribes that joined Brennus in this invasion.

The campaign of 279 BC proved less successful than that of the previous year. While a Greek coalition force of Aetolians, Boeotians, Athenians, Phocians, and other Greeks north of Corinth mustered at the narrow pass of Thermopylae, on the east coast of central Greece, Brennus pushed southward with his warriors. A Greek attempt to delay the Gauls at the Spercheios failed when a Gallic force of ten thousand swam the river and moved to outflank the outnumbered Greeks.

At the Battle of Thermopylae, the Greeks initially managed to check the Gallic advance, inflicting heavy losses on Brennus' army. In an attempt to divide the Greek coalition force and thereby weaken it, Brennus detached approximately forty thousand of his warriors from the main army and dispatched them to Aetolia. This detachment sacked Callia and proceeded to brutally pillage the Aetolian towns and temples. Alarmed at the news, the Aetolian detachment left Thermopylae in order to defend their homeland.

The news from Aetolia undermined Greek morale and prompted the defection of the Heracleots and the Aenianians from the Greek coalition. Eager for the Gauls to leave their territories, the Heracleots and the Aenianians showed Brennus how to bypass the main pass at Thermopylae in order to outflank the Greek force. Brennus once again divided his army, leaving the main force under the command of Acichorius while he himself took a detachment through the same path used by the Persians some two centuries previously, defeating the Phocian attachment charged with guarding it.

Alerted by the Phocians, the Greek coalition force abandoned Thermopylae and were evacuated by the Athenian fleet. Unwilling to wait for Acichorius, Brennus marched his warriors to the sanctuary of Apollo at Delphi and according to some sources, despoiled it.

The Greeks eventually succeeded in driving out the Gauls, wounding Brennus and causing his eventual death. At this point, the Gauls splintered. Some of them, including a part of the Tectosages, would cross the Hellespont and settle in Galatia. The rest were thought to have returned to their homelands in southern Gaul, bearing with them the treasures of Greece.

Junianus Justinus, excerpting the work of Gnaeus Pompeius Trogus, claims that those Tectosages who returned to Tolosa suffered "a pestilential distemper" that was not dispelled until after they had thrown their plunder into the lakes.

== Disappearance of the gold ==
The migrations of the Cimbri and the Teutones.

During the latter part of the second century BC, a large coalition of German and Gallic tribes, which eventually included the Cimbri, the Teutones, the Boii, the Tigurini, and the Ambrones, undertook a mass migration. After this coalition inflicted several defeats on Rome, a Roman army under the command of the consul Lucius Cassius Longinus in 107 BC confronted the Tigurini near Burdigala, modern-day Bordeaux. The Romans were defeated badly and a number of Gallic tribes, including the Volcae Tectosages, revolted. A second force, under the command of the consul Quintus Servilius Caepio, was dispatched to Gallia Transalpina to restore order in 106 BC.

After subduing Tolosa, Caepio reported the discovery of a massive hoard of treasure. Strabo, citing Poseidonius, said the treasure amounted to some fifteen thousand talents of gold and silver bullion, while Justinus and Orosius reports the haul at 100,000 pounds of gold and 110,000 pounds of silver.

Despite orders to send the treasure to Rome, the gold never reached the city. Orosius recorded that Caepio had sent the treasure under guard to Massilia, a local Roman ally. However, the soldiers guarding the gold were slain, with the treasure itself never found again. Caepio was suspected of having stolen the gold in its entirety.

The theft of the gold was soon overshadowed by Caepio's prominent role in the defeat at the Battle of Arausio in 105 BC, the greatest Roman disaster since Cannae. Now proconsul and unwilling to cooperate with his superior, the novus homo consul Gnaeus Mallius Maximus, Caepio, eager for glory, provoked a battle with the Cimbri. The end result was a rout, with at least 70,000 Roman legionaries dead, and total losses numbering over 120,000.

While Caepio survived the debacle, his career did not. He was quickly stripped of his proconsular imperium and his seat in the Roman Senate. He was soon brought up on charges by the tribune of the plebs Gaius Norbanus. Charged over the loss of his army, Caepio was stripped of his Roman citizenship, fined 15,000 talents, had his property confiscated, and forbidden fire and water within eight hundred miles of Rome. He died in exile in Smyrna.

== Aurum habet Tolosanum ==
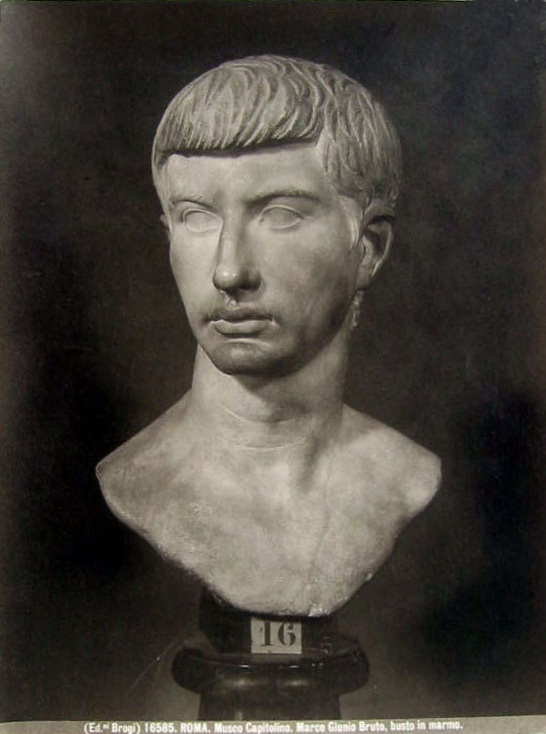
Marble bust of Brutus, supposedly the last heir of the Gold of Tolosa

The gold of Tolosa was never found, but was suspected to have remained in the custody of the Servilli Caepiones, who despite the total impoverishment of their patriarch, became immensely wealthy. Despite this, the heirs of Caepio also seemed to suffer from unlucky ends. During the Social War, Caepio's son, also called Quintus Servilius Caepio, was tricked by the Marsic general Quintus Poppaedius Silo and ambushed, which resulted in the destruction of his army and his own death. Caepio's grandson died young from an unnamed illness, while the last heir, Caepio's great-grandson Marcus Junius Brutus, would undertake the assassination of Julius Caesar, an action which eventually led to the rise of Octavian and the Roman Empire, and Brutus' death at the Battle of Philippi.

Perhaps as a consequence of these generational misfortunes, the sources make frequent allusions to the gold being cursed. The earliest, Strabo, says that due to "having laid hands on [the gold of Tolosa]... Caepio ended his life in misfortunes", while his near-contemporary Pompeius Trogus even suggested that the defeat at Arausio was punishment for the theft of the treasure. A Latin proverb, Aurum habet Tolosanum ("He has got the gold of Tolosa"; taken to mean “His ill-gotten wealth will do him no good.”) was even formed as a result.

== Disagreements in the ancient sources ==
As is common, the ancient sources frequently contradict each other. Cicero is the earliest author whose extant writings mention the Gold of Tolosa, referencing the inquiry into its disappearance in De Natura Deorum, which was written in the two years before his death in 43 BC. Cicero does not mention its provenance, but at least establishes that it was believed to exist. A fragment from the history-book written by Cassius Dio between 200 and 222 AD, asserts the hoard's origin as that of treasure looted from Delphi.

Strabo, writing as late as 17 AD, also mentions the account of the treasure's origin as the plunder of Delphi, but prefers Poseidonius's account, now lost. Quoting Poseidonius, Strabo asserts that "the temple at Delphi was in those times already empty of such treasure, because it had been robbed at the time of the sacred war by the Phocians." Poseidonius did not believe that the Tectosages successfully brought away the plunder of Delphi to Tolosa, as they had "suffered wretchedly" during the retreat and gone in different directions. Instead, Poseidonius wrote that the origin of the hoard was in Gaul itself, "since the country was rich in gold, and also belonged to people who were god-fearing and not extravagant in their ways of living, it came to have treasures..."

The only extant sources to mention the Gallic attack on Delphi are the second-century AD travelogue of Pausanias and the history of Justinus, the latter of which excerpts the first century BC works of Pompeius Trogus. Pausanias states that the Gauls did not sack the temple sanctuary and that none of the Gauls survived the retreat, while Justinus's summary states that the attack was a disaster and resulted in the fragmentation of the Gallic force, with some settling in Anatolia, others in Thrace, and a third contingent that returned to Tolosa.

While Strabo argued that the Temple of Apollo at Delphi lacked the treasure to be plundered as the Phocians had already taken it in during the Third Sacred War (356–346 BC), Philip of Macedon's settlement of that conflict had included the stipulation that the Phocians repay what they had plundered from the temple of Delphi at the rate of 60 talents a year. Excluding Phocian reparations, Pausanias' account describes a number of expensive artistic votive offerings made to the sanctuary from all over the ancient Greek world in the years preceding the invasion.
