= Gaius Flavius =

Gaius Flavius or Gaius Flavius Fimbria may refer to:

- Gaius Flavius Fimbria (cavalry prefect)
- Gaius Flavius Fimbria (consul 104 BC)
- Artur Hulu, known online as Gaius Flavius; originator of the "How often do you think of the Roman Empire?" TikTok trend
