= Servilia (wife of Catulus) =

- Born: ca. 124 BC
- Spouse: Quintus Lutatius Catulus
- Children: Lutatia
- Parents: Quintus Servilius Caepio (father); Caecilia Metella (mother)

Servilia was the wife of Quintus Lutatius Catulus, the consul during 102 BC. She was of the patrician Caepione branch of the Servilia gens.

== Biography ==
=== Early life ===
Servilia was most likely the daughter and oldest child of Quintus Servilius Caepio the consul of 106 BC. If so she was the sister of another Quintus Servilius Caepio and Servilia, the wife of Marcus Livius Drusus. Their mother is uncertain but was likely a Caecilia Metella. The historian Edward Courtney identified her as Cato the Younger's half-sister Servilia, but this is unlikely. Yet another theory was by Brunt who believed her to be the sister of the consul of 106, but Susan Treggiari thinks this is less probable than her being his daughter.

=== Marriage ===
Servilia married Quintus Lutatius Catulus and they had at least one child, a daughter named Lutatia who married the orator Quintus Hortensius, she also became the step-mother of his son Quintus Lutatius Catulus Capitolinus. In 105 BC her father is disgraced because of the Arausio disaster and forced into exile, Catulus divorces her and marries a woman named Claudia. It appears that Servilia lived with her son-in-law and daughter later in life. When governor Gaius Verres was accused of abuse on the island of Sicily his accuser Quintus Caecilius Dio fled to Servilia since she was Dio's hostess on the island. In Rome Dio informed Hortensius and Servilia of the issues with Verres. In 70 BC when Verres was on trial Hortensius served as Verres lawyer while Servilia was there to support Dio. It is also possible that Servilia was related to the Quintus Caecilius Metellus who enfranchised Dio, since her mother was likely a Metella.

She is praised by Cicero in his letters as a wonderful woman (femina primaria).

Despite this she was insulted by Strabo who claimed that both she and her sister became prostitutes.

== See also ==
- Women in ancient Rome
- List of Roman women

== Sources ==
- Cic. Verr, ii. 8.
