= Lucius Cassius Longinus =

Lucius Cassius Longinus may refer to:

== Romans ==
- Lucius Cassius Longinus (consul 30)
- Lucius Cassius Longinus (proconsul 48 BC)
- Lucius Cassius Longinus (praetor 66 BC), and part of the Second Catilinarian conspiracy
- Lucius Cassius Longinus (tribune 105 BC)
- Lucius Cassius Longinus (consul 107 BC)
- Lucius Cassius Longinus Ravilla, a Roman consul in 127 BC

== See also ==
- Cassius Longinus (disambiguation)
