= Gaius Atilius Serranus =

Roman senator

Gaius Atilius Serranus (c. 149 – 87 BC) was a Roman senator, who served as consul in 106 BC as the colleague of Quintus Servilius Caepio.

== Career ==
Although noted by Cicero as being a "a most stupid man" (stultissimus homo), he managed to defeat Quintus Lutatius Catulus in the consular elections of the previous year. Before this, Serranus had presumably held the office of praetor by 109 BC, a necessary requirement in the senatorial career track.

Serranus was one of the senators of consular rank who took up arms against the tribune Saturninus in 100 BC. He is probably the Atilius Serranus who was murdered on orders of Gaius Marius following the conclusion of the civil war in 87 BC.

== Family ==
Serranus may have been the father or more likely grandfather of Atilia the wife of Cato the Younger.

== See also ==
- List of Roman consuls

== Sources ==
- Broughton, T. Robert S. (1951). The Magistrates of the Roman Republic Volume I: 509 B.C.–100 B.C. New York: American Philological Association. pp. 545, 553.
- Klebs, Elimar, "Atilius 64", Realencyclopädie der classischen Altertumswissenschaft, volume 2, part 2, column 2098 (Stuttgart, 1896).

Political offices
Preceded by Lucius Cassius Longinus; Gaius Marius	Roman consul 106 BC with Quintus Servilius Caepio	Succeeded by Publius Rutilius Rufus; Gnaeus Mallius Maximus
