= Fimbria =

A fimbria (plural fimbriae, adjective fimbriate) is a Latin word that literally means "fringe." Fimbria or Fimbriate may also refer to:

- Fimbria (bivalve), a genus of clams
- Fimbria, also called Pilus, hair-like projection on bacteria and archaea
- Fimbria (female reproductive system), a fringe of tissue near the ovary leading to the fallopian tube
- Fimbria (neuroanatomy), a prominent band of white matter along the medial edge of the hippocampus in the brain
- Fimbriate, a botanical term meaning "fringed" e.g. petals
- Fimbriation, in heraldry and vexillology, the use of contrasting strips to separate similar colours

== Roman name ==
- Gaius Flavius Fimbria (consul 104 BC), consul of the Roman Republic with Gaius Marius
- Gaius Flavius Fimbria (cavalry prefect) (died 84 BC), son of the consul of 104 BCE
