= Publius Rutilius Rufus =

Roman statesman and historian

- Born: c. 160 BC
- Died: after 78 BC
- Occupations: Politician; soldier; orator; historian
Office
Military tribune	134–132 BC
Praetor	by 118 BC
Legate	109–107 BC
Consul	105 BC
Legate (Asia)	c. 97 BC

Publius Rutilius Rufus (c. 160 BC – after 78 BC) was a Roman politician, soldier, orator, and historian. He was consul in 105 BC, with Gnaeus Mallius Maximus as his colleague. A military man, he had served in more junior roles in wars against Numantia, Jugurtha, and the Cimbri.

After his consulship, while serving as a legate of Quintus Mucius Scaevola in provincial Asia, he attempted to safeguard the population from extortion by influential equites. Prosecuted at Rome c. 94 BC for extorting those same provincials, according to the Ciceronean tradition he was unjustly condemned. He then left for exile in Asia, settling at Mytilene and Smyrna, living among those he had supposedly extorted. The author of a history of Rome in Greek, he survived the upheavals of the Mithridatic Wars and was still alive in the early 70s BC when Cicero visited him there.

== Early life ==
The child of a homonymous father who had served as plebeian tribune in 169 BC, Rutilius also had a brother called Gaius and a sister. His early political career was likely rocky: his father's citizenship was stripped by the censors shortly his tribunate amid a clash with them; he also had no known consular ancestors. Rufus studied philosophy under Panaetius (becoming a Stoic), law, and public speaking under Sulpicius Galba.

== Military career and consulship ==
He was a military tribune in 134 BC, assigned to the war against the Numantines in Spain under Publius Cornelius Scipio Aemilianus. While in Spain he must have come into contact with Gaius Marius and Jugurtha who also served under Scipio. He probably saw action during the Siege of Numantia. After his return to Rome, probably around the late 120s BC, he stood for the plebeian tribunate but was defeated.

He must have served a praetorship, probably as urbanus, in or before 118 BC since, in 116 BC, he stood for the consulship. He was however defeated in the election by Marcus Aemilius Scaurus. After the elections he prosecuted Scaurus for ambitus. Scaurus in turn prosecuted Rufus for the same charge. Both prosecutions failed. He remained active in politics, with a focus on forensic activity and legislation.

By 109 BC, Rufus was a legate of Quintus Caecilius Metellus Numidicus in the war on Jugurtha. He feuded with one of the other legates under Metellus' command, Gaius Marius. He distinguished himself in the Battle of the Muthul, where he faced a charge by Bomilcar and managed to capture or maim most of the Numidian war elephants. He remained in Numidia until 107 BC with Metellus, serving until Marius – who had won the consulship of 107 BC with a campaign attacking Metellus' record in Numidia – arrived to take over the command. The following year, in 106 BC, he stood for the consulship again with substantial aristocratic support.

Elected, he served as consul in 105 BC with Gnaeus Mallius Maximus. During his time as consul, Rome was in the Cimbrian War against the migrating Germanic tribes, the Cimbri and Teutons, in Transalpine Gaul. The consular command in the war fell to Mallius, likely by lot; Mallius' defeat at the Battle of Arausio left Rutilius in sole charge of state affairs. In the aftermath of the defeat, he levied more troops for the defence of Italy, even issuing an edict to bar anyone eligible for conscription from leaving the peninsula. He also improved military training by bringing gladiatorial instructors to train the men how to use their swords and imposing strict military discipline. He also passed legislation to allow for consular appointment of military tribunes amid a shortage of officers. His enmity with Marius was likely exacerbated when Marius, one of his consular successors, took his army along with Cimbrian command.

After the war against the Cimbri was won, Rutilius participated in the suppression of Lucius Appuleius Saturninus' insurrection in Rome. An associate of the Metelli, after the retirement of Metellus Numidicus in 98 BC (alongside his recall from exile), his political allies were mostly spent. A political realignment away from the Metelli towards the factions arrayed around Marius and Scaurus, the princeps senatus, left Rutilius politically isolated with his personal enemies in power.

== Exile and later life ==
Accompanying his friend Quintus Mucius Scaevola Pontifex to provincial Asia, he served there as his legate. He was possibly legate in 98 or 97 BC, though 98 BC is more probable. The two men severely punished and suppressed abuses of the publicani in the province and were honoured by the provincials with festival celebrations. When Scaevola left the province after some eight months, Rutilius remained there to govern it until a successor arrived.

Under the ire of the equestrians and more politically isolated than Scaevola, he was thus prosecuted for extortion. The year of the trial is not certain; it must have occurred after 95 BC and in or before 92 BC. Prosecuted by one Apicius (possibly the famous 1st century gorumand), possibly with the support of Marcus Scaurus (though this has been disputed), Rutilius spoke pro se with the support of Scaevola and Gaius Aurelius Cotta. He declined to seek the support of the then-prominent advocates Marcus Antonius and Lucius Licinius Crassus. Although Cicero paints Rutilius' trial as a martyrdom in the vein of Socrates – apparently refusing to don mourning dress and omitting character witnesses – it is likely he genuinely sought acquittal. His conviction on false charges by an all-equestrian jury within a few years became a cause célèbre for jury reform, taking up by the reformist tribune Marcus Drusus, who was also related to Rutilius by marriage. The verdict fined him an enormous sum which he could not pay (Cassius Dio adduces this as evidence that the charges of corruption were false); he was forced to sell his estate at Formiae and leave into exile.

He retired to Mytilene, where he lived "as an honoured citizen among the provincials he was alleged to have oppressed". Escaping the Mithridatic massacres of Italians across provincial Asia in 88 BC, he then moved to Smyrna, where he was one of the envoys in the negotiations between Lucius Cornelius Sulla and Gaius Flavius Fimbria (commanders of opposing Roman armies) during the First Mithridatic War. Although invited by Lucius Cornelius Sulla to return to Rome as part of his retinue, Rutilius refused, possibly feeling that he had been betrayed by the Roman aristocracy. He acquired citizenship at Smyrna and instead continued his retirement, during which he wrote an apologetic history which was deeply critical of Marius. It was eventually one of the sources used by the biographer Plutarch. Cicero, who had studied with Rutilius' friend Scaevola in his youth, visited Rutilius at Smyrna as late as the year 78 BC. He possessed a thorough knowledge of law, and wrote treatises on that subject, some fragments of which are quoted in the Digests.

== Family ==
He married Livia, the daughter of the Gaius Livius Drusus who was consul in 147 BC. No adult children are known. A son, mentioned in the narrative of his consulship of 105 BC, likely died young.

== In fiction ==
- In Steven Saylor's novel Wrath of the Furies, Publius Rutilius Rufus features as one of the secondary characters.
- In Colleen McCullough's novel The First Man in Rome (the first book in her Masters of Rome series) Publius Rutilius Rufus features as one of the secondary characters.

== Bibliography ==
- Alexander, Michael Charles (1990). Trials in the late Roman republic, 149 BC to 50 BC. Toronto: University of Toronto Press. ISBN 0-8020-5787-X. OCLC 41156621.
- Badian, Ernst (2012). "Rutilius Rufus, Publius". Oxford Classical Dictionary (4th ed.). Oxford University Press. doi:10.1093/acrefore/9780199381135.013.5638.
- Broughton, Thomas Robert Shannon (1951). The magistrates of the Roman republic. Vol. 1. New York: American Philological Association.
- Broughton, Thomas Robert Shannon (1952). The magistrates of the Roman republic. Vol. 2. New York: American Philological Association.
- Broughton, Thomas Robert Shannon (1986). The magistrates of the Roman republic. Vol. 3. Atlanta, GA: Scholars Press.
- Kallet-Marx, Robert (1990). "The trial of Rutilius Rufus". Phoenix. 44 (2): 122–139. doi:10.2307/1088326. ISSN 0031-8299. JSTOR 1088326.
- Münzer, Fredrich (1914). "Rutilius 34" . Realencyclopädie der classischen Altertumswissenschaft (in German). Vol. I A, 1. Stuttgart: Butcher. cols. 1269–1280 – via Wikisource.
- Sumner, G V (1973). The orators in Cicero's Brutus: prosopography and chronology. Heritage. University of Toronto Press. JSTOR 10.3138/j.ctvcj2j22.
- Zmeskal, Klaus (2009). Adfinitas (in German). Vol. 1. Passau: Verlag Karl Stutz. ISBN 978-3-88849-304-1.

Preceded by Quintus Servilius Caepio and Gaius Atilius Serranus	Consul of the Roman Republic with Gnaeus Mallius Maximus; 105 BC	Succeeded by Gaius Flavius Fimbria and Gaius Marius
