= Quintus Lutatius Catulus Capitolinus =

Senator of the Roman Republic

Quintus Lutatius Catulus Capitolinus (c. 121 – 61 BC) was a politician in the late Roman Republic. His father was the like-named Quintus Lutatius Catulus, consul in 102 BC. He gained the agnomen "Capitolinus" for his defense of the capital in 77 BC against Lepidus.

== Biography ==
Catulus inherited his father's hatred of the leading statesman and general Marius, and was a consistent though moderate supporter of the aristocracy. During Sulla's proscription, Catulus avenged the death of his father with the assistance of Catiline, who tortured and killed Marcus Marius Gratidianus at the tomb of the senior Catulus.

During Sulla's dictatorship, he was involved in the reconstruction of the Temple of Jupiter Optimus Maximus which had been destroyed by fire in 83, also giving his name to the new temple.

In 78 BC, he was consul with Marcus Aemilius Lepidus, who after the death of Sulla proposed the overthrow of his constitution, the re-establishment of the distribution of grain, the recall of the banished, and other measures in the populares spirit. Catulus vigorously opposed this, and a temporary compromise was effected.

But Lepidus, having levied troops in his province of Transalpine Gaul, returned to Rome at the head of an army. Catulus defeated him at the Milvian bridge and near Cosa in Etruria after which Lepidus made his escape to Sardinia, where he died soon afterwards. In 67 and 66 Catulus unsuccessfully opposed the Gabinian and Manilian laws which he viewed as prejudicial to constitutional freedom because they conferred special powers upon Pompey. He consistently opposed Julius Caesar, whom he endeavoured to implicate in the Catilinarian conspiracy. Caesar, in return, accused him of embezzling public money during the reconstruction of the temple on the Capitol, and proposed to obliterate his name from the inscription and deprive him of the office of commissioner for its restoration. Catulus' supporters rallied round him, and Caesar dropped the charge. Later Caesar took his revenge on Catulus by defeating him in the election to the religious office of Pontifex Maximus in 63 BC.

Catulus held the office of censor, but soon resigned, being unable to agree with his colleague Crassus. Although not a man of great abilities, Catulus exercised considerable influence through his political consistency and his undoubted solicitude for the welfare of the state.

Catulus's great-grandson was the emperor Galba, whom Suetonius claims was extremely proud of his ancestry: "Nero was succeeded by Galba, who was related in no degree to the house of the Caesars, although unquestionably of noble origin and of an old and powerful family; for he always added to the inscriptions on his statues that he was the great-grandson of Quintus Lutatius Catulus Capitolinus."

== See also ==
- Tabularium, built by Catulus and Lepidus in 78 BC.

Political offices
Preceded by P. Servilius Vatia; Ap. Claudius Pulcher	Roman consul 78 BC; With: M. Aemilius Lepidus	Succeeded by D. Junius Brutus; Mam. Aemilius Lepidus Livianus
