= Porticus Catuli =

The Porticus Catuli (Latin for the "Portico of Catulus") was a portico on the Palatine Hill in ancient Rome. It was a local landmark (monumentum). It was built by Quintus Lutatius Catulus (consul 102 BC) to commemorate his joint victory with Gaius Marius over the Cimbri at Vercellae.

The portico was adjacent to Catulus's house (domus), which Pliny the Elder regarded as one of the grandest built in the late 2nd century BC. The practice of expanding a family's home from the relatively modest structures of the mid-Republic began at this time. The Porticus Catuli became known for the display of artwork there. Its impressiveness rivaled that of the Temple of Honor and Virtue built by Marius also to commemorate the victory, for which both men earned a triumph.

The Porticus Catuli was located on a prominent piece of real estate that had already been highly politicized. It had formerly been the site of the house of M. Fulvius Flaccus, one of the supporters of the popularist Gaius Gracchus who were condemned to death and had their property confiscated and destroyed. In the mid-1st century BC, the Porticus Catuli was involved in the feud between Cicero and Clodius. When Cicero was condemned to exile for putting Roman citizens to death without allowing them right of appeal, Clodius razed Cicero's house and perhaps also the Porticus Catuli to build a shrine (aedes) to Libertas. If the portico was razed rather than incorporated into the new religious complex, it was rebuilt along with Cicero's house when the orator was restored to Rome.
