= Gaius Flavius Fimbria (consul 104 BC) =

Roman consul 104 BCE

Gaius Flavius Fimbria, according to Cicero, rose to the highest honours in the republic through his own merit and talent.

In 105 BC, he was a candidate for the consulship, and the people gave him the preference to his competitor, Quintus Lutatius Catulus; and accordingly, Fimbria was the colleague of Gaius Marius in his second consulship, 104 BC. Fimbria must have acquired his popularity about that time, for previously he had been an unsuccessful candidate for the tribuneship.

What province he obtained after his consulship is unknown, but he seems to have been guilty of extortion during his administration, for M. Gratidius brought an accusation of embezzlement against him, and was supported by the evidence of Marcus Aemilius Scaurus; but Fimbria was nevertheless acquitted. During the revolt of Saturninus in 100 BC, Fimbria, with other consulars, took up arms to defend the public good. Cicero describes him as a clever jurist; as an orator he had considerable power, but was bitter and vehement in speaking. Cicero, in his boyhood, read the speeches of Fimbria; but they soon fell into oblivion, for, at a later time, Cicero says that they were scarcely to be found anywhere.

Preceded by Gnaeus Mallius Maximus and Publius Rutilius Rufus	consul of the Roman Republic with Gaius Marius; 104 BC	Succeeded by Lucius Aurelius Orestes and Gaius Marius
