= Lucius Cassius Longinus (tribune 105 BC) =

Roman plebeian tribune in 105 BC

Lucius Cassius Longinus was a Roman politician and statesman who served as tribune of the plebs in the year 105 BC. He was of no relation to his identically-named contemporary, the consul for 107 BC who died fighting the Tigurini.

In the tribunate, he served with colleagues including Gnaeus Domitius Ahenobarbus. During his year, Longinus passed a law stripping persons who had their imperium revoked by the assemblies of their seats in the Roman Senate; the law was targeted towards the defeated general Quintus Servilius Caepio who had lost the Battle of Arausio in 107 BC, and after the battle, was stripped of his proconsular imperium by the assembly.

The tribunate of 104 BC is the only office recorded for this Cassius in T R S Broughton's Magistrates of the Roman Republic.
