= Quintus Servilius Caepio (consul 106 BC) =

Ancient Roman general and statesman

- Died: after 90 BC
- Criminal penalty: Exile
- Spouse: Caecilia Metella
- Children: Quintus Servilius Caepio; Servilia; Servilia (possibly)

Quintus Servilius Caepio was a Roman statesman and general, consul in 106 BC, and proconsul of Cisalpine Gaul in 105 BC. He was the father of Quintus Servilius Caepio and the grandfather of Servilia.

== Consulship and Arausio ==
During his consulship in 106 BC, he passed a controversial law, with the help of the famous orator Lucius Licinius Crassus, by which the jurymen were again to be chosen from the senators instead of the equites. However, it appears this law was overturned by a law of Gaius Servilius Glaucia in either 104 or 101 BC.

After his consulship, he was assigned to Gaul, where he captured the town of Tolosa, ancient Toulouse. There, he found some 50 thousand bars of gold and 10 thousand bars of silver which were legendarily stolen from the temple of Delphi by the Scordisci in the Gallic invasion of the Balkans in 279 BC. The riches of Tolosa were shipped back to Rome, but only the silver arrived; the gold was stolen by a band of marauders, rumoured to have been hired by Caepio himself. The Gold of Tolosa was never found, and was said to have been passed all the way down to the last heir of the Servilii Caepiones, Marcus Junius Brutus.

During the southern migration of the Cimbri in 105 BC, Caepio was assigned an army to defeat the migrating tribe. Also tasked to defeat the Cimbri was the consul for that year, Gnaeus Mallius Maximus, who was a novus homo ("new man"). While the sitting consul outranked Caepio, Caepio refused to cooperate with the consul and his army. Leading one of the two Roman armies into the Battle of Arausio, this refusal to cooperate with his superior officer, led to the destruction of both armies. Caepio refused to camp with Maximus and his troops; when the battle began, both Roman armies were overrun and defeated by the massively numerically superior Cimbri force, resulting in the deaths of some 60 to 80 thousand Roman soldiers.

== Exile ==
Upon his return to Rome, Caepio was stripped of his proconsulship by the Assembly. A law proposed by Lucius Cassius Longinus stripped any person of his seat in the Senate if he had had his imperium revoked by the Senate. Based on this law, Caepio was stripped of his seat in the Senate. Then, he was tried in the courts for the theft of the Tolosa gold, but with many senators on the jury, he was acquitted.

He was then tried for "the loss of his army" by two tribunes of the plebs, Gaius Norbanus and Lucius Appuleius Saturninus. Despite being defended by the orator Lucius Licinius Crassus, Caepio was convicted, and was given the harshest sentence allowable: he was stripped of his citizenship, forbidden fire and water within eight hundred miles of Rome, nominally fined 15,000 talents (about 825,000 lb) of gold, and forbidden to see or speak to his friends or family until he had left for exile. The huge fine — which greatly exceeded the amount in the Roman treasury — was never collected.

Two versions detail what happened thereafter: according to one, Caepio died in prison and his body, mangled by the executioner, was put on display on the Gemonian stairs; however, according to the more commonly accepted version, he spent the rest of his life in exile in Smyrna in Asia Minor. Historian Timagenes claimed that he was survived only by his daughters, if true, he must have died after 90 BC since that was when his son Quintus was killed.

== Family ==
Caepio was likely married to a Caecilia Metella with whom he had at least three children, a son named Quintus Servilius Caepio, and at least two daughters; Servilia, the wife of Marcus Livius Drusus and possibly Servilia, the wife of Catulus (although it is possible that Catulus' wife was actually his sister). His wife may have been a daughter of Quintus Caecilius Metellus Macedonicus.

== See also ==
- Servilia gens

== Notes ==
- Chisholm, Hugh, ed. (1911). "Caepio, Quintus Servilius" . Encyclopædia Britannica (11th ed.). Cambridge University Press.

Preceded by Lucius Cassius Longinus; Gaius Marius	Roman consul 106 BC; With: Gaius Atilius Serranus	Succeeded by Publius Rutilius Rufus; Gnaeus Mallius Maximus
