= Quintus Lutatius Catulus (consul 102 BC) =

Roman politician and general (149–87 BC)

- Born: 149 BC
- Died: 87 BC (aged 62)
- Spouse(s): Domitia; Servilia; Claudia
- Children: Q. Lutatius Catulus Capitolinus; Lutatia

Quintus Lutatius Catulus (149–87 BC) was a consul of the Roman Republic in 102 BC. His consular colleague was Gaius Marius. During their consulship the Cimbri and Teutones marched south again and threatened the Republic. While Marius marched against the Teutones in Gaul, Catulus had to keep the Cimbri from invading Italy. In this he failed; the Cimbri succeeded in invading the Po Valley. In 101 BC Catulus, as proconsul, continued the war against the Cimbri. Marius, elected consul for the fifth time, joined him and together they campaigned against the Germanic invaders in the Po Valley. At the Battle of Vercellae Marius and Catulus decisively defeated the Cimbri and ended the Germanic invasion. After Vercellae the two feuded, and Catulus consequently committed suicide following Marius's victory in the civil war of 87 BC.

== As a general ==
During Catulus' consulship, the Romans found out the wandering Cimbri and Teutones were planning to invade Italy. Catulus, as junior consul, was sent to defend the passes through the Alps from Noricum against the Cimbri while the senior consul, Gaius Marius, campaigned against the Teutones and their allies the Ambrones in Gaul. While he was up in the Alps, Catulus pacified much of the territory's tribes with the help of Lucius Cornelius Sulla, who served Catulus as a legate. Catulus found his task impractical, because there were multiple passes and he would have to divide and weaken his army; he decided to retreat to a more defensible position.

During the retreat Catulus became worried the Cimbri would corner his army; therefore he decide to attempt to score a minor victory in order to extricate his troops from the region. He led his army onto a mountain, which overlooked the Cimbri camp, and then ordered his men to remain ready for battle while he had a camp raised in view of the barbarians. When night fell Catulus attacked the Cimbri, then used the chaos this caused to cross a stream and continue his march southwards.

Catulus marched until he reached the Atesis River; there he ordered his men to construct fortifications on both sides of the river with a bridge between them. When the Cimbri arrived, they made camp and investigated Catulus' defences. Their scouts reported they could not cross the river anywhere in the immediate area, so they decided to dam the Atesis by throwing earth, rocks, and trees into the stream creating a makeshift dam. Unnerved by the diminishing water flow the Romans started to break camp.

Catulus unsuccessfully tried to get his troops back to their stations. When the Cimbri finally launched their assault, they found just one cohort defending the camp on the far side of the river. These men fought with courage and somehow managed to escape. Catulus had retreated in the face of the enemy twice, but he had kept his army intact. The following year (101) his command was prolonged and he was given proconsular powers.

The Cimbri, who had advanced into the Po Valley, were eventually defeated on the Raudine plain, near Vercellae, by the combined armies of Catulus and Gaius Marius. Catulus commanded the Roman centre during the battle and redeemed himself by leading his men to victory. For his part in the victory over the Cimbri he was awarded a Triumph. Despite their joint success, the two commanders regarded each other as bitter rivals and after the war built competing temples to demonstrate divine favour.

When the chief honour for victory over the Cimbri was given to Marius, Catulus turned vehemently against his former co-commander and sided with Sulla to expel Marius, Cornelius Cinna and their supporters from Rome. When Cinna and Marius regained control of the city in 87 BC, Catulus was prosecuted by Marius's nephew, Marcus Marius Gratidianus. Rather than accept the inevitable guilty verdict, he committed suicide by locking himself in a room with a charcoal fire and suffocated.

== As an author ==
Catulus was a distinguished orator, poet and prose writer, and was well versed in Greek literature. He wrote a history of his consulship (De consulatu et de rebus gestis suis) in the manner of Xenophon. A non-extant epic on the Cimbrian War, sometimes attributed to him, was more likely written by Archias. Catulus's contributions to Latin poetry are considered his most significant literary achievements. He is credited with introducing the Hellenistic epigram to Rome and fostering a taste for short, personal poems that comes to fruition with the lyric oeuvre of Valerius Catullus in the 50s BC. Among his circle of literary friends, who ranged widely in social position and political sympathies, were Valerius Aedituus, Aulus Furius, and Porcius Licinius.

Pliny lists him among distinguished men who wrote short poems that were less than austere (versiculi parum severi). Only two epigrams by Catulus have been preserved, both directed at men. Cicero preserves one of Catulus's couplets on the celebrated actor Roscius, who is said to make an entrance like a sunrise: "though he is human, he seems more beautiful than a god."

The other epigram, modelled directly after Callimachus, is quoted by Aulus Gellius and may be paraphrased in prose as follows:

My mind escapes me; I imagine it's decamped to the usual place: Theotimus. That's right, he runs the asylum. What if I don't outlaw it, and instead of letting the fugitive come to him inside, he prefers ejection? We'll go on a manhunt, but in truth I'm alarmed that we might be captured in the flesh ourselves. What to do? Venus, I need a plan.

"The willingness of a member of the highest Roman aristocracy to toss off imitations of Hellenistic sentimental erotic poetry (homosexual at that)," notes Edward Courtney, "is a new phenomenon in Roman culture at this time."

== As a builder ==
Catulus was a man of great wealth, which he spent in beautifying Rome. Two buildings were known as Monumenta Catuli: the Temple of Fortuna Huiusce Diei (the "Fortune of This Day"), to commemorate the day of Vercellae, and the Porticus Catuli, built from the sale of the Cimbrian spoils.

== Family ==
Catulus' mother Popillia later married a Lucius Julius Caesar and by him was mother to Lucius Julius Caesar and Gaius Julius Caesar Strabo. Cicero lauded Catulus for the panegyric he delivered on the death of his mother, describing it as the first time a Roman matron had been so honoured.

Three wives are attested for Catulus:

1. Domitia of the Ahenobarbi, the mother of his son Quintus Lutatius Catulus Capitolinus (consul 78, censor 65 BC).
2. Servilia of the Caepiones, who was mother of his daughter Lutatia, the wife of the great orator Quintus Hortensius (consul 69).
3. Claudia, of uncertain family but probably of the Marian aligned branch of Marcelli, likely a daughter of Marius' friend and legate Marcus Claudius Marcellus. This was probably Catulus' longest marriage (c. 103-87 BC), if, as seems likely, he wed her to secure Marian support for his election as a consul, which he only belatedly achieved at the comitia in 103 for 102 BC. However, she is only attested as his wife at the time of his death at the end of 87 BC. There is no record of any children by this match.

An approximate chronology of the marital affairs of Catulus:

- c. 126 BC: Married Domitia
- 125 or 124 BC: Birth of Catulus Capitolinus
- c. 111 BC: Death or divorce of Domitia
- c. 109 BC: Praetor, married Servilia. She was probably the eldest daughter (born around 124 BC) of his coeval, and colleague as praetor, Quintus Servilius Caepio (cos. 106 BC). The latter's apparently promiscuous daughters were harshly abused as whores by Timagenes of Alexandreia.
- c. 108 BC: Birth of Lutatia (mother of Hortensia Oratrix and Quintus Hortensius Hortalus, the poet and Caesarian)
- 105 BC: Arausio disaster, and disgrace and imprisonment of Quintus Servilius Caepio
- 104 BC: Caepio escaped into exile and Catulus divorces Caepio's daughter Servilia
- 103 BC: Catulus married Claudia and is finally elected consul for 102 BC after three previous defeats.

== In fiction ==
Catulus appears in Colleen McCullough's Masters of Rome novels. Rather than a half brother to Caesar Strabo and Lucius Caesar, McCullough depicts Catulus as having been born a Caesar and adopted into the Lutatius Catulus family; she names him "Catulus Caesar" according to the custom of retaining the former name.

This version of Catulus is a pompous aristocrat and an inept general during his consulship with Marius in The First Man in Rome. When fighting the Cimbri his senior legate, Sulla, forces him, on threat of mutiny, to retreat to a more defensible position.

== See also ==
- Hortensius (Cicero)

Political offices
Preceded by Gaius Marius; Lucius Aurelius Orestes	Consul of the Roman Republic; 102 BC; With: Gaius Marius	Succeeded by Gaius Marius; Manius Aquillius
