= Gnaeus Mallius Maximus =

Roman politician and general

Gnaeus Mallius Maximus (fl. 108 – 105 BC) was a Roman Republican politician and general. A novus homo, he was consul in 105 BC during which he was defeated by the Cimbri at the battle of Battle of Arausio.

Little is known of his career before the consulship of 105 BC. He must have previously served as praetor, at least by 108 BC, before his consular term. In 105 BC he was consul posterior and assigned to the province of Transalpine Gaul to stop the migration of the Cimbri and the Teutons. However, when he arrived with his army, he and the proconsul also the province, Quintus Servilius Caepio, refused to cooperate. The proconsul's army remained on the far side of the River Rhône, keeping them disunited, even in defiance of envoys from the Senate. With Caepio encamping between Mallius' army and the Cimbri, the migrating tribes attacked and overran both armies in detail at the Battle of Arausio.

Among the fatalities were Mallius' two sons, one of his legates, and most of his army. He returned to Rome and, two years later in 103 BC, he was prosecuted for the defeat before a iudicium populi. Relevant proceedings were called by the plebeian tribune Lucius Appuleius Saturninus, who may have prosecuted; although defended by the orator Marcus Antonius, he was convicted. After the conviction Mallius was placed under an aquae et ignis interdictio by rogatio; that is, like Cicero later, he was "denied water and fire", a formulaic expression of banishment. The proconsul Quintus Servilius Caepio, blamed by all the ancient historians for the defeat, was also exiled after two trials that occurred the same year.

The defeat at Arausio created fear in Rome for the safety of the Italian peninsula and the continuation of the Republic. The Assembly then took the unprecedented and then-illegal step of electing, in absentia, Gaius Marius, then proconsul in Africa prosecuting the Jugurthine War, to a second consulship in three years to deal with the threat.

== Bibliography ==
- Alexander, Michael Charles (1990). Trials in the late Roman republic, 149 BC to 50 BC. Toronto: University of Toronto Press. ISBN 0-8020-5787-X. OCLC 41156621.
- Broughton, Thomas Robert Shannon (1951). The magistrates of the Roman republic. Vol. 1. New York: American Philological Association.
- Broughton, Thomas Robert Shannon (1952). The magistrates of the Roman republic. Vol. 2. New York: American Philological Association.
- Broughton, Thomas Robert Shannon (1986). The magistrates of the Roman republic. Vol. 3. Atlanta, GA: Scholars Press.
- Duncan, Mike (2017). The storm before the storm. New York: PublicAffairs. ISBN 978-1-5417-2403-7.
- Kelly, Gordon P (2006). A history of exile in the Roman republic. Cambridge University Press. doi:10.1017/CBO9780511584558. ISBN 978-0-521-84860-2.

Preceded by Quintus Servilius Caepio and Gaius Atilius Serranus	Consul of the Roman Republic with Publius Rutilius Rufus; 105 BC	Succeeded by Gaius Flavius Fimbria and Gaius Marius
