= Gaius Marius =

Roman general and statesman (c. 157–86 BC)

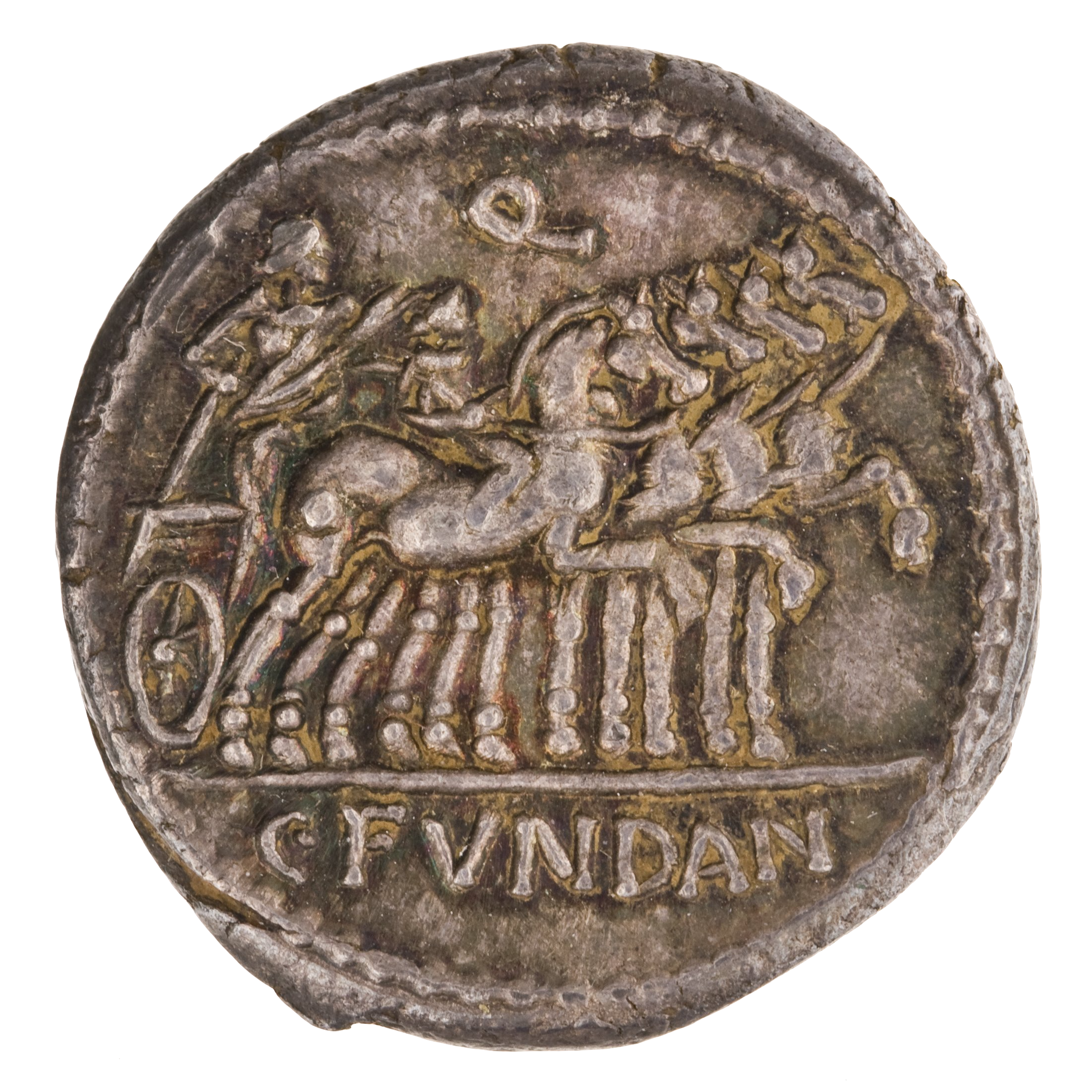
- Reverse of a denarius of 101 BC, depicting Marius as triumphator in a chariot, his son before him
- Born: c. 157 BC; Cereatae, Italy
- Died: 13 January 86 BC (aged 70–71); Rome
Office
Tribune of the plebs	119 BC
Praetor	115 BC
Proconsul, Hispania Ulterior	114–13 BC
Legate, Numidia	109–08 BC
Consul	107, 104–100 BC
Proconsul, Italy	88–87 BC
Consul	86 BC
- Spouse: Julia (aunt of Julius Caesar)
- Children: Gaius Marius the Younger

Military service
- Awards: 2 Roman triumphs
- Wars: Numantine War; Jugurthine War; Cimbrian War; Social War; Bellum Octavianum

Gaius Marius (Latin: [ˈɡaːiʊs ˈmariʊs]; c. 157 BC – 13 January 86 BC) was a Roman general and statesman. Marius held the office of consul seven times, more than any other Roman in the Republican period. Rising from a family of smallholders in a village called Ceraetae in the district of Arpinum, Marius acquired his initial military experience serving under Scipio Aemilianus at the Siege of Numantia in 134 BC. He won election as tribune of the plebs in 119 BC and passed a law limiting aristocratic interference in elections. Barely elected praetor in 115 BC, he next became the governor of Further Spain where he campaigned against bandits.

Marius attained his first consulship in 107 BC and became the commander of Roman forces in Numidia, where he brought an end to the Jugurthine War. By 105 BC Rome faced an invasion by the Cimbri and Teutones, and the comitia centuriata elected Marius consul for a second time to face this new threat. Marius was consul every year from 104 to 100 BC, defeating the Teutones at Aquae Sextiae and the Cimbri at Vercellae. Marius suffered political setbacks during his sixth consulship in 100 BC and subsequently withdrew from active public life.

The Roman Republic entered a period of crisis with the outbreak of the Social War in 91 BC, in which Marius held a command with limited success. He became embroiled in a conflict with the Roman general Sulla which resulted in his exile to Africa in 88 BC. Marius returned to Italy from Carthage during the War of Octavius, seized Rome, and conducted a purge of political opponents, after which he was elected consul for the seventh time. He died within weeks of assuming this seventh consulship in 86 BC.

In the nineteenth century, Marius was credited with the Marian reforms, including the transition from militia levies to a professional soldiery, modifications to the pilum (a kind of javelin), and changes to the logistical structure of the Roman army. Twenty-first-century historians generally characterise this attribution as "a construct of modern scholarship".

== Life ==
=== Early career ===
Marius was born in Cereatae c. 157 BC, a small village near the town of Arpinum in south-east Latium. The town had been conquered by the Romans in the late fourth century BC and was initially given Roman citizenship without voting rights (civitas sine suffragio). Only in 188 BC, thirty years before his birth, did the town receive full citizenship. Although Plutarch claims that Marius's father was a labourer, this is almost certainly false since Marius had connections with the nobility in Rome, he ran for local office in Arpinum, and he had marriage relations with the local nobility in Arpinum, all of which when taken together indicate that he was born into a locally important family of equestrian status. While many of the problems he faced during his early career in Rome show the difficulties that faced a "new man" (novus homo) in being accepted into the stratified upper echelons of Roman society, Marius – even as a young man – was not poor or even middle-class; he was most assuredly born into inherited wealth, gained most likely from large land holdings. In fact, his family's resources were definitely large enough to support not just one member of the family in Roman politics, but two: Marius's younger brother, Marcus Marius, (Note: Marcus Marius was a few years younger than Gaius Marius. He was elected as a praetor for 102 BC and later served as governor pro consule of Hispania Ulterior. The younger Marius, however, would never be able to attain the consulship, likely dying in the 90s BC.) also entered Roman public life.

In 134 BC, Marius joined the personal legion of Scipio Aemilianus as an officer for the expedition to Numantia. It is unclear whether or not Marius was already present and serving in Numantia with the previous commander when Aemilianus arrived. While serving with the army at Numantia, his military aptitude brought him to the attention of Scipio Aemilianus. According to Plutarch, during a conversation after dinner, when the conversation turned to generals and someone asked Scipio Aemilianus where the Roman people would find a worthy successor to him, the younger Scipio gently tapped on Marius's shoulder, saying "Perhaps this is the man".

It would seem that even at this early stage of his military career, Marius had ambitions for a political career in Rome. He was elected on the basis of his accomplishments, even though he was not known by sight to the electors, as one of the twenty-four special military tribunes. After election, he likely served Quintus Caecilius Metellus Balearicus on the Balearic Islands, helping him win a triumph. Next, Marius possibly ran for the quaestorship after losing an election for local office in Arpinum. He may have stood for local office as a means of gaining support back home, and lost to a local competitor. It is possible, however, that Marius never ran for the quaestorship at all, jumping directly to plebeian tribune. He likely participated in the major Roman victory at the Battle of the Isère River in 121 BC, which permanently cemented Roman control over southern Gaul.

In 120 BC, Marius was returned as a plebeian tribune for the following year. He won with the support of the Metelli, specifically Lucius Caecilius Metellus Dalmaticus. While Plutarch says the Metelli were one of his family's hereditary patrons, this may be a latter-day exaggeration. It was not uncommon for prospective consuls to campaign for their candidates for the tribunate and lower the possibility of opposition tribunes exercising their vetoes.

Plutarch relates that against the wishes of his patrons, he pushed through a law that restricted the interference of the wealthy in elections. In the 130s, voting by ballot had been introduced in elections for choosing magistrates, passing laws and deciding legal cases, replacing the earlier system of oral voting. The wealthy continued to try to influence the voting by inspecting ballots, and Marius passed a law narrowing the passages down which voters passed to cast their votes in order to prevent outsiders from harassing the electors or seeing who was voted for. It is not clear, however, whether Plutarch's narrative history properly reflects how controversial this proposal in fact was; Cicero, writing during the Republic, describes this lex Maria as quite straightforward and uncontroversial. Plutarch reports that he then alienated the plebs by vetoing a bill expanding the grain dole, but it is more likely that Plutarch misinterpreted Marius as vetoing attempts to interfere in the existing grain provisions.

Soon thereafter, in 117 BC, Marius stood for the aedileship and lost. It seems clear that by this time, due to the enormous financial difficulties that any prospective aedile would have to shoulder, Marius had either amassed or was availed of significant financial resources. This loss was at least in part due to the enmity of the Metelli. In 116 BC he barely won election as praetor for the following year, coming in last, and was promptly accused of ambitus (electoral corruption). Being accused of electoral corruption was common during the middle and late Republic and details of the trial are sketchy or apocryphal. Marius, however, was able to win acquittal on this charge, and spent an uneventful year as praetor in Rome, likely as either praetor peregrinus or as president of the corruption court. In 114 BC, Marius's imperium was prorogued and he was sent to govern the highly sought-after province of Further Spain (Latin: Hispania Ulterior) pro consule, where he engaged in some sort of minor military operation to clear brigands from untapped mining areas. He likely governed his province for two years before returning to Rome late in 113 BC with his personal wealth greatly enlarged.

He received no triumph on his return, but he did marry Julia, the aunt of Julius Caesar. The Julii Caesares were a patrician family, but at this period seem to have found it hard to advance beyond the praetorship into the consulship. The Julii had done so only once in the second century, in 157 BC. The match was advantageous to both sides: Marius gained respectability by marrying into a patrician family and the Julii received a great injection of energy and money. Sources are unclear on whether Marius joined the annual race of former praetors for the consulship, but it is likely that he failed to be elected at least once.

=== Subordinate to Metellus ===
The Jugurthine War started in 112 BC due to "Roman exasperation with the ambitions of Jugurtha", a Numidian king who had killed his half-brothers, massacred Italians in his civil war against them, and bribed many prominent Romans to support him in the Senate. After the start of hostilities, the first army sent to Numidia was apparently bribed to withdraw and the second army was defeated and forced to pass under the yoke in humiliation. These debacles eroded trust in the ability of the aristocracy to adequately manage foreign affairs.

While Marius had seemingly broken with the Caecilii Metelli during his time as tribune and praetor, the Metelli did not seem to hold this rupture against him so much as to pass over him for selection as legate in the opening phases of the Jugurthine War. In 109 BC, likely to improve his chances for the consulship, Marius joined then-consul Quintus Caecilius Metellus in his campaign against Jugurtha. In Sallust's long account of Metellus's campaign, no other legates are mentioned, so Marius was probably Metellus's senior subordinate and right-hand man. Metellus was using Marius's strong military experience, while Marius was strengthening his position to stand for the consulship.

During the Battle of the Muthul, Marius's actions probably saved the army of Metellus from annihilation. Jugurtha had cut the Romans off from the River Muthul where they wanted to refill their water reserves. The Romans had to fight Jugurtha in the desert where the Numidian light cavalry had an advantage. The Numidian cavalry scattered the Romans into small detachments and soon had control of the battlefield. Each group of Romans was fighting for survival independently. At this point Marius re-organized a few detachments and led a column of 2,000 men through the Numidians to link up with Metellus. Together they led their men against the Numidian infantry who occupied a hill. After gaining control of the hill Marius and Metellus led their men against the rear of the Numidian cavalry. The Romans gained the initiative and the Numidians had no choice but to withdraw.

=== Standing for the consulship ===
By 108 BC, Marius expressed his desire to stand for consul. Metellus did not give Marius his blessing to return to Rome, allegedly advising Marius to wait until Metellus's son was elected (who was at the time only twenty, signifying a campaign decades in the future). Undeterred, Marius began to campaign for the consulship. Sallust claims that this was catalysed, in part, by a fortune-teller in Utica who "declared that a great and marvellous career awaited him; the seer accordingly advised him, trusting in the gods, to carry out what he had in mind and put his fortune to the test as often as possible, predicting that all his undertakings would have a happy issue".

Marius soon earned the respect of the troops by his conduct towards them, eating his meals with them and proving he was not afraid to share in any of their labours. He also won over the Italian traders by claiming that he could capture Jugurtha in a few days with half of Metellus's troops. Both groups wrote home in praise of him, suggesting that he could end the war quickly, unlike Metellus, who was pursuing a policy of methodically subduing the countryside.

During the winter of 109 and 108 BC, a detachment of Roman soldiers serving as the garrison of Vaga was ambushed and cut down almost to a man. The garrison commander, one Titus Turpilius Silanus, a client of Metellus, escaped unharmed. Marius allegedly urged Metellus to sentence Silanus to death on charges of cowardice, but then turned on Metellus, arguing that the sentence was disproportionate and overly harsh. Marius also sent letters back to Rome claiming that Metellus had become enamoured with the unlimited powers associated with his imperium. Metellus, wary of an increasingly disgruntled and resentful subordinate, permitted Marius to return to Rome. According to Plutarch, he returned with barely enough time to make it back for the consular elections; but according to Sallust, with enough time to effectively canvass for votes.

With growing political pressure towards a quick victory over Jugurtha and equestrian hostility toward the senate's conduct of the war, Marius was elected consul for 107 BC, campaigning against Metellus's apparent lack of swift action against Jugurtha, with Lucius Cassius Longinus as his colleague. The senate prorogued Metellus's command in Numidia, thereby preventing Marius from assuming command. Marius got around this by inducing an ally of his, then-tribune Titus Manlius Mancinus, to have the concilium plebis override the Senate's decision and give him the command. Metellus refused to personally hand over command to Marius and returned to Rome. Upon his return, the senate voted Metellus a triumph and the agnomen Numidicus.

=== Command in Numidia ===
Seeking troops to bolster the forces in Numidia and win his promised quick victory, Marius found it difficult to recruit from Rome's traditional source of manpower, property-holding men. Except in emergencies, normal practice in the middle republic was only to allow property-owning citizens to enlist in the legions; this may have been related to Tiberius Gracchus's reforms which would have, by giving more people more land, made more men eligible to serve in the legions. While the senate allowed Marius to conscript men normally, he preferred instead to request volunteers, especially among discharged veterans (evocati), with promises of victory and plunder. He also recruited volunteers from men without property, the capite censi. With more troops mustering in southern Italy, Marius sailed for Africa, leaving his cavalry in the hands of his newly elected quaestor, Lucius Cornelius Sulla.

Marius found that ending the war was more difficult than he had previously boasted. Jugurtha was fighting a guerrilla war, and it appeared that no strategy would work better than Metellus's strategy of denying Jugurtha local reinforcement and support. Marius arrived comparatively late in 107 BC but still fought and won a battle near Cirta (modern Constantine, Algeria). At the end of 107 he surprised Jugurtha by a dangerous desert march to Capsa in the far south where, after the town surrendered, he killed all the adult men, enslaved the remaining survivors, and razed the town, distributing the loot to his soldiers. Keeping up the pressure, he drove Jugurtha's forces southwards and westwards into Mauretania. Marius had been supposedly unhappy at receiving the dissolute and libertine Lucius Cornelius Sulla as his quaestor, but Sulla proved a highly competent officer and was well liked by the men.

Meanwhile, Jugurtha was trying to get his father-in-law king Bocchus of Mauretania to join him in the war against the Romans. In 106, Marius marched his army far to the west, capturing a fortress near the river Molochath. Unfortunately, this advance brought him near the dominions of Bocchus, finally provoking the Mauretanian into action; in the deserts just west of Serif, Marius was taken by surprise by a combined army of Numidians and Mauretanians under the command of the two enemy kings. For once, Marius was unprepared for action and in the melee all he could do was form defensive circles. The attack was pressed by Mauretanian and Gaetulian horsemen and for a time Marius and his main force found themselves besieged on a hill, while Sulla and his men were on the defensive on another hill nearby. The Romans managed to hold off the enemy until evening and the Africans retired. The next morning at dawn the Romans surprised the Africans' insufficiently guarded camp and completely routed the Numidian–Mauretanian army. Marius then marched east to winter quarters in Cirta. The African kings harried the retreat with light cavalry, but were beaten back by Sulla, whom Marius had put in command of the cavalry. It was by now evident that Rome would not defeat Jugurtha's guerrilla tactics through military means. Therefore, Marius resumed negotiations with Bocchus, who, though he had joined in the fighting, had not yet declared war.

Ultimately, Marius reached a deal with Bocchus whereby Sulla, who was friendly with members of Bocchus's court, would enter Bocchus's camp to receive Jugurtha as a hostage. In spite of the possibility of treachery on the Mauritanian's part, Sulla agreed; Jugurtha's remaining followers were massacred, and he himself was handed over in chains to Sulla by Bocchus. In the aftermath, Bocchus annexed the western part of Jugurtha's kingdom and was recognised as an ally of Rome. Jugurtha was thrown into an underground prison (the Tullianum) in Rome, and ultimately died after gracing Marius's triumph in 104 BC.

Sulla and Marius, after the triumph, disputed who received credit for capturing Jugurtha. As Sulla was acting as Marius's subordinate, under Roman tradition, the credit was Marius's; Sulla and his noble allies, however, focused on Sulla's direct responsibility to discredit Marius's victory. According to Plutarch, this was "the first seed" of their "incurable hatred".

=== Putative reforms to the military ===
Marius has, in modern scholarship starting from the 1840s in Germany, repeatedly been attributed with broad reforms to the military during his consulships between 107 and 100 BC. The standard narrative is that after a series of manpower shortages, Marius received a dispensation to recruit volunteers from the poorest census class, the proletarii, for the war against Jugurtha in 107 BC. There is, however, very little evidence that Italy's population fell during the second century, that any major reforms to the Roman army occurred in the second century, or that Marius was responsible; specialists now increasingly dismiss these "Marian reforms" as a "construct of modern scholarship".

The recruitment of proletarii in 107, documented in Sallust, seems to have been a one-time affair: the volunteers were discharged on their return from the war and Marius, upon assuming command against the Cimbri, took over command of a consular army in northern Italy levied in the traditional manner. There are no indications that open recruitment of volunteers changed the social composition of the legions and later texts indicate that the Romans continued to raise most of their armies by conscription. The armies of the late Republic still were predominantly drawn from rural populations. The narrative that the army's domination by poor volunteers, who in search of riches and retirement bonuses became the clients of their generals, who then used those armies to overthrow the republic, is now rejected.

Other reforms attributed to Marius include the abolition of the citizen cavalry and light infantry, a redesign of the pilum, a standardised eagle standard for all legions, and the substitution of the cohort for the maniple. There is little evidence for the abolition of the citizen cavalry and light infantry by the first century BC, as they are still attested in evidence. If Marius redesigned the pilum, archaeological finds indicate his design was soon discarded. Literary evidence indicates that eagle standards continued to co-exist through the late republic with other traditional animal standards including the ox and wolf. (Note: Beyond army proletarianisation, attested in Sallust, the only reforms attributed to Marius in the ancient evidence are his redesigned pilum and the introduction of the aquila. Both claims are given in relatively late sources, removed by centuries from Marius' time. They are also both disproved by, respectively, archaeological and documentary evidence.) Lastly, there is no ancient evidence that Marius introduced the cohort; Sallust's narrative gives the last attestation of the maniple in 109 BC under Metellus Numidicus' command.

Changes to logistical arrangements and training, the muli Mariani ("Marius's mules") of common historiography, were regular practice among Roman generals: seeking victory, they generally sought the speed advantages of operating without large baggage trains and to ensure that their men were well-trained for combat.

=== Cimbri and Teutones ===
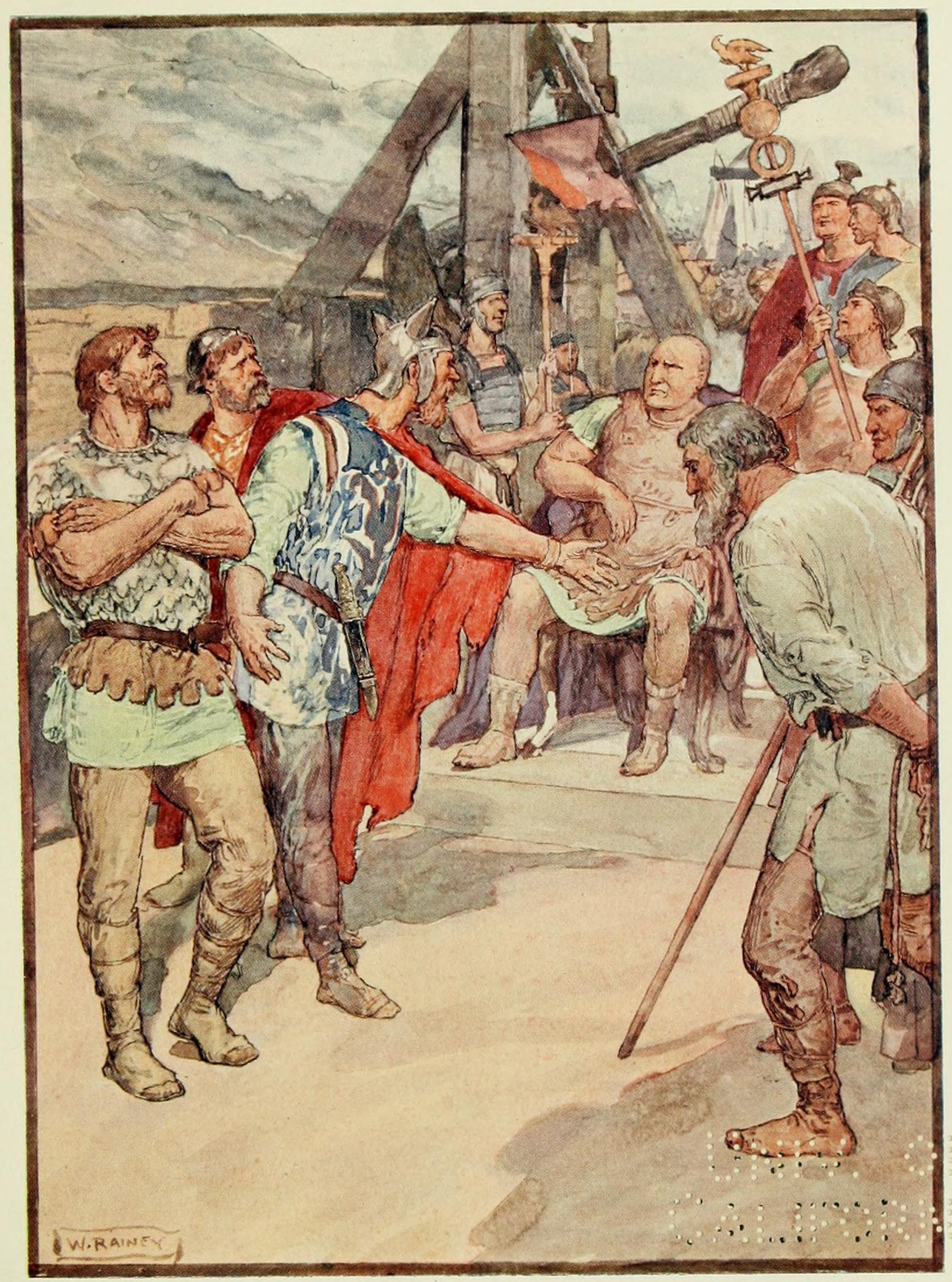
Marius and the ambassadors of the Cimbri, depicted by W. Rainey in the 1900 book Plutarch's lives for boys and girls

In 109 BC a migrating Germanic tribe called the Cimbri appeared in Gaul and routed the Roman army there under Marcus Junius Silanus. This defeat reduced Roman prestige and resulted in unrest among the Celtic tribes recently conquered by the Romans in southern Gaul. In 107 the consul Lucius Cassius Longinus was completely defeated by the Tigurini, and the senior surviving officer (one Gaius Popillius, son of the consul of 132) had saved what was left only by surrendering half the baggage and suffering the humiliation of having his army "pass under the yoke". The next year, 106 BC, another consul, Quintus Servilius Caepio, marched to Gaul with a new army to salvage the situation. Caepio was prorogued into the next year and the new consul for 105 BC, Gnaeus Mallius Maximus, was also assigned to southern Gaul with another army. Caepio's disdain for Mallius – a new man like Marius with a hunger for glory – made it impossible for them to cooperate.

The Cimbri and another tribe called the Teutones appeared on the Rhône, and while Caepio was on the west bank he refused to come to the aid of Mallius on the east. The Senate was unable to induce Caepio to cooperate with Mallius, which proved both generals' undoing. At the Battle of Arausio (modern Orange), the Cimbri overran Caepio's legions with massively overwhelming numbers. Caepio's routed men crashed into Mallius's troops, which led to both armies being pinned against the Rhône and annihilated by the numerically dominant Cimbrian warriors. News of this defeat reached Rome just shortly after Marius completed the campaign against Jugurtha successfully.

The Republic, altogether lacking generals who had recently concluded military campaigns successfully, took the illegal step of electing Marius in absentia for a second consulship in three years. While his election was not unprecedented, as Quintus Fabius Maximus had been elected for consecutive consulships and it was not unheard of for consuls to be elected in absentia, the precedent was certainly not recent. Yet, since the Assembly had the ability to overturn any law, it simply set aside the requirements and made Marius consul.

==== As consul ====
Marius was still in Africa when the Assembly elected him consul for 104 BC. At the start of his consulship, Marius returned from Africa in spectacular triumph, bringing Jugurtha and the riches of North Africa to awe the citizenry. Jugurtha, who had prophesied the purchase and destruction of Rome, met his end in a Roman prison after having been led through the streets of the city in chains. Marius was assigned (it is unclear whether by the Assembly or by sortition) the province of Gaul to deal with the Cimbric threat.

The Cimbri, after their decisive victory at Arausio, marched west into Hispania. Marius was tasked with rebuilding, effectively from scratch, the Gallic legions. Building his army around a core of trained legionaries from the last year, Marius again secured exemption from the property requirements and with his newly minted reputation for victory, raised an army of some thirty thousand Romans and forty thousand Italian allies and auxiliaries. He established a base around the town of Aquae Sextiae (modern Aix-en-Provence) and trained his men.

One of his legates was his old quaestor, Sulla, which shows that at this time there was no ill will between them. In 104 BC, Marius was returned as consul again for 103 BC. Though he could have continued to operate as proconsul, it is likely that the people re-elected him as consul so as to avoid another incident of disputed command à la Caepio and Mallius. While Plutarch – possibly referencing the memoirs of Rutilius Rufus – jibed that Marius's consular colleagues were his servants, Evans dismisses this.

In 103 BC, the Germans still did not emerge from Hispania, and Marius's colleague died, requiring Marius to return to Rome to call elections. Lacking a decisive conclusion to the Cimbrian conflict over the last two years, it was not a foregone conclusion that Marius would win reelection. An appeal by a young tribune, Lucius Appuleius Saturninus, in a public meeting before the vote – along with a field of candidates without great name recognition – allowed Marius to be returned as consul again in 102 BC. His colleague was Quintus Lutatius Catulus. Over his successive consulships, Marius was not idle. He trained his troops, built his intelligence network, and conducted diplomacy with the Gallic tribes on the provincial frontiers.

==== Battle with the Germanic tribes ====
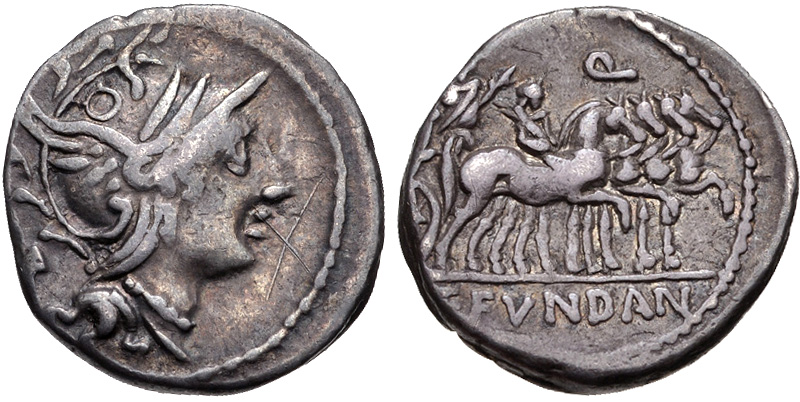
Denarius of the quaestor Gaius Fundanius, 101 BC. The obverse depicts the head of Roma, while the reverse depicts Gaius Marius as triumphator in a chariot; the young man on horseback is probably his son. Marius was awarded this triumph for his victory over the Teutones.

The migration of the Cimbri and the Teutons.: Roman victories.: Cimbric and Teutonic victories.

The decision to re-elect Marius as consul for 102 BC was vindicated when the Cimbri returned from Hispania and, with a number of other tribes, moved on Italy. The Teutones and their allies the Ambrones were to head south and advance toward Italy from the west along the coast; the Cimbri were to attempt to cross the Alps into Italy from the north by the Brenner Pass; and the Tigurini (the allied Celtic tribe who had defeated Longinus in 107) were to cross the Alps from the northeast. The two consuls divided their forces, with Marius heading west into Gaul and Catulus holding the Italian Alps.

In the west, Marius denied the Teutones and Ambrones battle, staying inside a fortified camp and fighting off their attempts to storm it. Failing to take his camp, the Teutones and their allies moved on. Marius shadowed them, waiting for an opportune moment to attack. Near Aquae Sextiae (modern Aix-en-Provence), an accidental skirmish between Roman camp servants, getting water, and bathing Ambrones turned into a spontaneous battle between Marius's army and the Ambrones in which the Romans defeated some 30,000 Ambrones. (Note: The Ambrones had apparently camped apart from the Teutones.) The next day, the Teutones and the Ambrones counterattacked up a hill against the Roman position. Marcus Claudius Marcellus flanked their advance with a column of three thousand men, turning the battle into a slaughter: estimates vary from 100,000 to 200,000 being slain or captured. Marius sent Manius Aquillius with a report to Rome that said 37,000 superbly trained Romans had succeeded in defeating over 100,000 Germans in two engagements.

Marius's consular colleague in 102 BC, Quintus Lutatius Catulus, who Marius may have expected to "spend a fruitless year employed in garrison duty", did not fare so well. He suffered some casualties in a minor engagement up in one of the mountain valleys near Tridentum. Catulus then withdrew and the Cimbri entered northern Italy. The Cimbri paused in northern Italy to regroup and await expected reinforcements from the other Alpine passes.

Shortly after Marius had vanquished the western invaders at Aquae Sextiae, Marius received news that he had been re-elected to his fourth consecutive consulship (and fifth consulship as a whole) as consul for 101 BC. His colleague would be his friend Manius Aquillius. After election, he returned to Rome to announce his victory at Aquae Sextiae, deferred a triumph, and promptly marched north with his army to join Catulus, whose command was prorogued since Marius's consular colleague was dispatched to defeat a slave revolt in Sicily.

In late July 101 BC, during a meeting with the Cimbri, the invading tribesmen threatened the Romans with the advance of the Teutones and Ambrones. After informing the Cimbri of their allies' destruction, both sides prepared for battle. In the ensuing battle – the Battle of Vercellae (or the Raudine Plain) – Rome decisively defeated the Cimbri. Caught off guard by Sulla's cavalry, pinned down by Catulus's infantry and flanked by Marius, the Cimbri were slaughtered and the survivors enslaved. Upwards of 120,000 Cimbri perished. The Tigurini gave up their efforts to enter Italy from the northeast and went home.

After fifteen days of thanksgiving, Catulus and Marius celebrated a joint triumph. Plutarch reports that Marius was also hailed as "the third founder of Rome", but this is unlikely, as the identification of Camillus as a second founder dates to after the Sullan-era annalists and may be in fact post-Ciceronean. In the popular imagination, it was Marius who "deserved to be the sole beneficiary of the two triumphs awarded for the decisive conclusion of the war". At the same time, Marius's consular colleague, Manius Aquillius, defeated the Sicilian slave revolt in the Second Servile War. Having saved the Republic from destruction and at the height of his political powers, Marius desired another consulship to secure land grants for his veteran volunteers and to ensure he received appropriate credit for his military successes. Marius was duly returned as consul for 100 BC with Lucius Valerius Flaccus; according to Plutarch, he also campaigned on behalf of his colleague so to prevent his rival Metellus Numidicus from securing a seat.

=== Sixth consulship ===
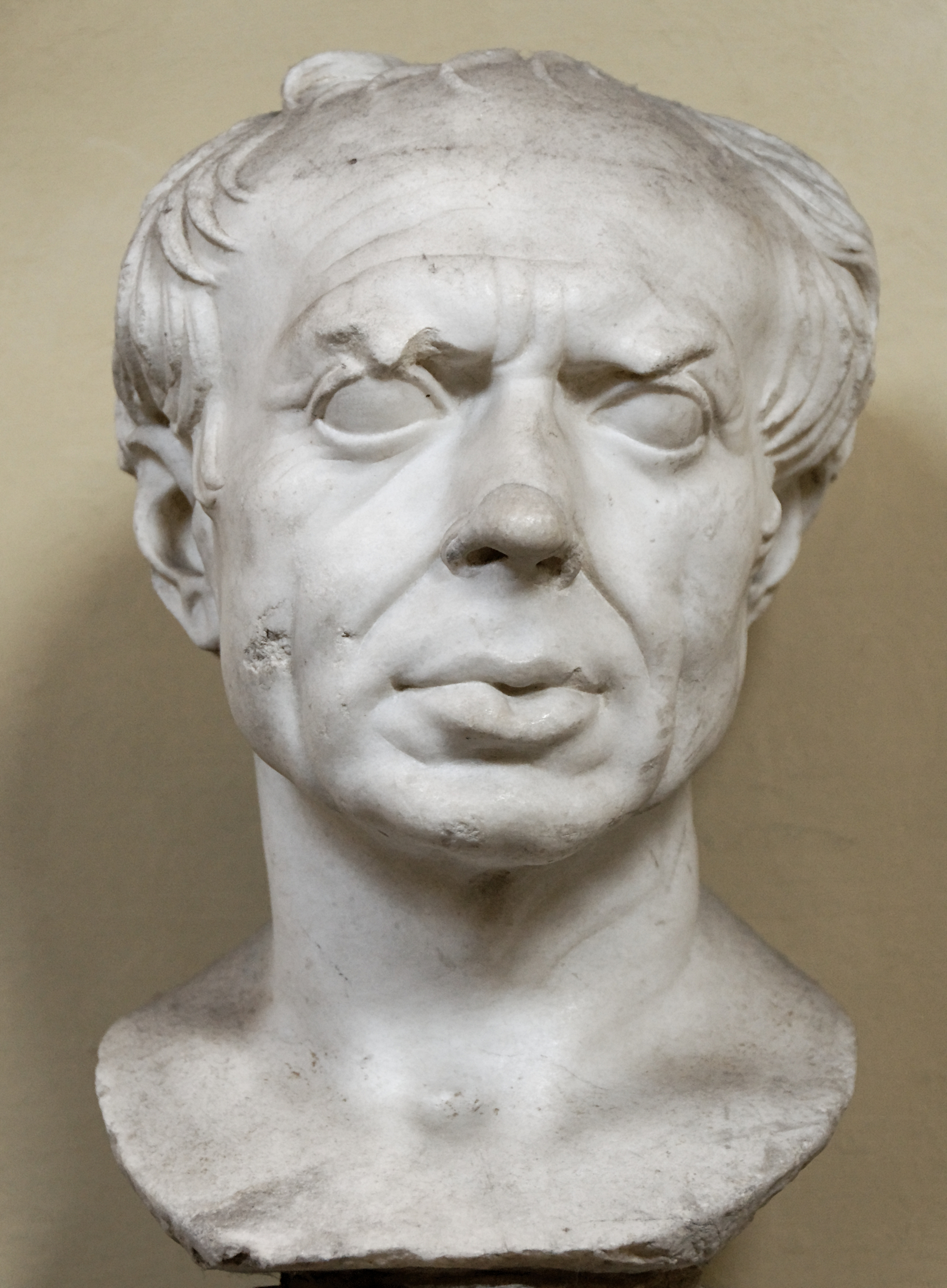
First century BC marble bust, the so-called "Marius"

During the year of Marius's sixth consulship (100 BC), Lucius Appuleius Saturninus was tribune of the plebs for the second time and advocated reforms like those earlier put forth by the Gracchi. Saturninus, after assassinating one of his political opponents to the tribunate, pushed for bills that would drive Marius's former commanding officer Metellus Numidicus into exile, lower the price of wheat distributed by the state, and give colonial lands to the veterans of Marius's recent war. Saturninus's bill gave lands to all veterans of the Cimbric wars, including those of Italian allies, which was resented by some of the plebs urbana.

Marius worked with Saturninus and Saturninus's ally Glaucia to pass the land bill and banish Metellus Numidicus, (Note: Metellus Numidicus refused to swear an oath required in the lex agraria; Saturninus attempted to have him removed from the senate but was vetoed by his tribunician colleagues. He brought a proposal to exile Metellus; Metellus went into exile before the proposal passed. Lintott 1994, p. 100) but then distanced himself from them and their more radical policies. Around the start of the annual campaign season for the consulship, Marius attempted to disqualify Glaucia from standing for consul. Because other candidates would lower the chances of Glaucia's victory, Saturninus and Glaucia had an opponent – Gaius Memmius – killed during the consular elections for 99 BC. The elections then were delayed. The Senate responded to Saturninus's attempt, to by violence force through Glaucia's candidacy over Marius's disqualification, by issuing a senatus consultum ultimum, and – for the first time – ordered the magistrates to take whatever actions they felt necessary to end unrest generated by other Roman magistrates.

After rejecting a plan to deploy the army near Rome under proconsul Marcus Antonius, Marius rallied volunteers from the urban plebs and his veterans. He cut the water supply to the Capitoline hill and put Saturninus under a short and decisive siege. After Saturninus surrendered, Marius attempted to keep Saturninus and his followers alive by locking them safely inside the senate house, where they would await prosecution. Possibly with Marius's implied consent, an angry mob broke into the building and, by dislodging the roof tiles and throwing them at the prisoners below, lynched those inside. Glaucia too was dragged from a house and killed.

In complying with the Senate's wishes, Marius tried to show the Senate, who had always been suspicious of his motives, that he was one of them instead of the outsider that Quintus Metellus said he was in 108 BC. Marius's overall concern was always how to maintain the Senate's esteem: in the words of the scholar A.N. Sherwin-White, Marius "wanted to end his days as vir censorius, like the other great worthies among the novi homines of the second century".

This episode in the city, however, won Marius little advantage. After he left office, Metellus Numidicus' relatives dogged him in mourning dress for his maltreatment of the general, pleading for his recall from exile. Plutarch states that Marius had alienated both senators and the people. It is, however, unlikely that Marius was abandoned by his clients and peers, as Plutarch also claims. Evans tells us that Marius entered a semi-retirement as an elder statesman, a role which "precluded a more active participation in public life".

=== 90s BC ===
After the events of 100 BC, Marius at first tried to oppose the recall of Metellus Numidicus, who had been exiled by Saturninus in 103. However, seeing that opposition was impossible, Marius decided to travel to the east to Galatia in 98 BC, ostensibly to fulfil a vow he had made to the goddess Magna Mater.

Plutarch portrays this voluntary exile as a great humiliation for the six-time consul: "considered obnoxious to the nobles and to the people alike", he was even forced to abandon his candidature for the censorship of 97. Plutarch also reports that while in the East, Marius attempted to goad Mithridates VI of Pontus into declaring war on Rome – telling Mithridates to either become stronger than Rome or obey her commands – so that the Roman people might be forced to rely on Marius's military leadership once more. This anecdote, however, is discounted by Evans, who dismisses it as "nothing more than a malicious rumour" perhaps created by Rutilius Rufus or Sulla. Other scholars have argued that the mission was instead planned by the Senate with the support of the princeps senatus Marcus Aemilius Scaurus for the purpose of investigating Mithridates' campaigns in Cappadocia without arousing too much suspicion.

However, scholars have pointed out that Marius's supposed "humiliation" cannot have been too long-lasting. In c. 98–97 BC, he was given the unprecedented honour of being elected in absentia to the college of priestly augurs whilst away in Asia Minor. Furthermore, Marius's mere presence at the trial of Manius Aquillius in 98 BC, his friend and former colleague as consul in 101 BC, was enough to secure acquittal for the accused, even though he was apparently guilty. Marius also successfully acted as sole defence for T. Matrinius in 95 BC, an Italian from Spoletium who had been granted Roman citizenship by Marius and who was now being prosecuted under a new citizenship law.

=== Social War ===
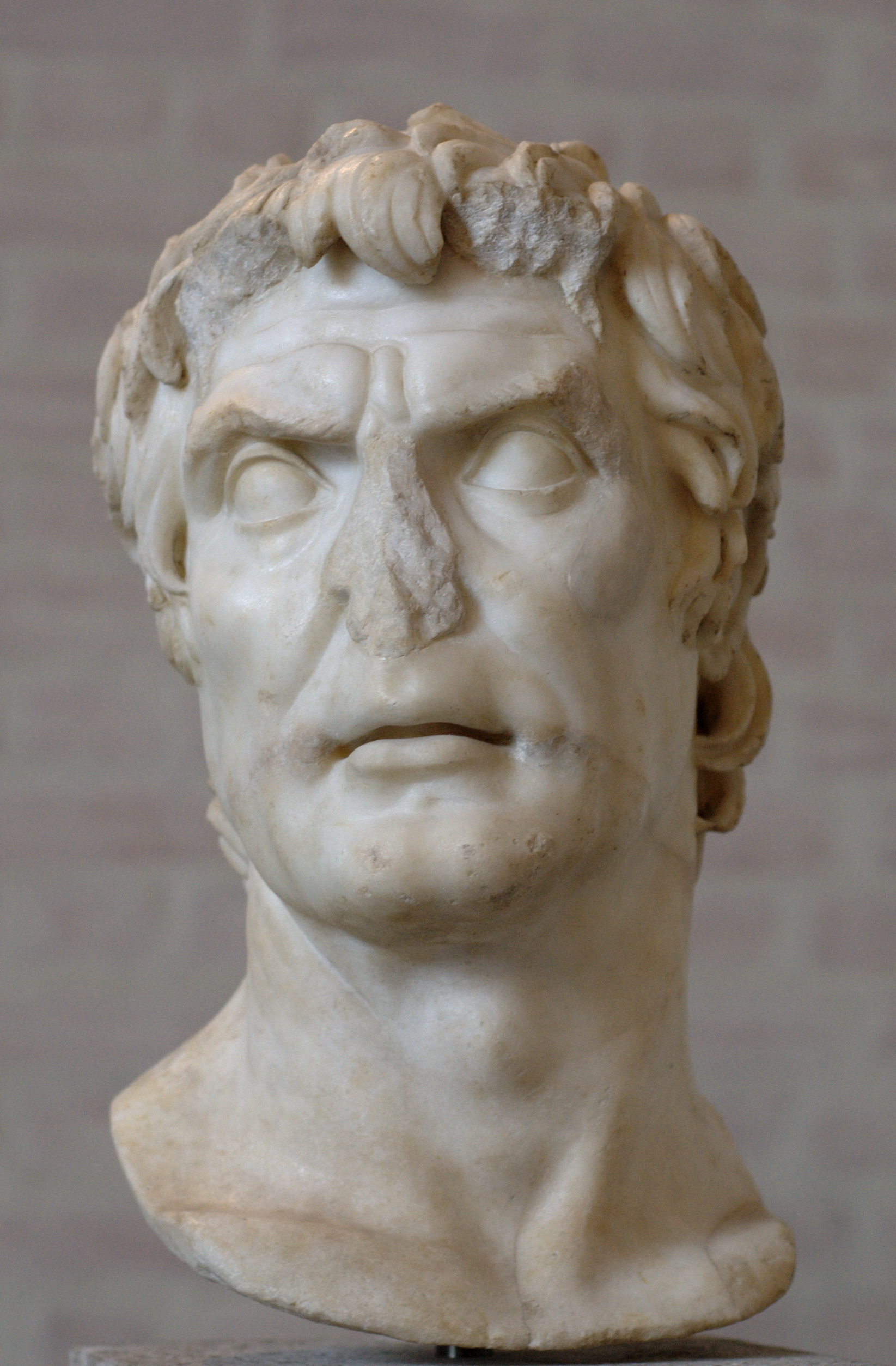
Possible portrait bust of Lucius Cornelius Sulla, Marius's former legate and the general he would fight with for control of the Mithridatic War

While Marius was away in the east and after he returned, Rome had several years of relative peace. But in 95 BC, Rome passed a decree, the lex Licinia Mucia, expelling from the city all residents who were not Roman citizens. In 91 BC, Marcus Livius Drusus was elected tribune; he proposed a wide-ranging reform programme to support the plebs with land reform and grain distribution laws, grant citizenship to the Italians to compensate for land reform's infringement on Italian property rights, and enlarge the senate with equestrians. Marius seemed not to have an opinion on Drusus's Italian question. However, after Drusus was assassinated, many of the Italian states revolted against Rome in the Social War of 91–87 BC, named after the Latin word for allies, socii.

In the next campaigning year, Marius is listed as one of the senior legates of the consul Publius Rutilius Lupus, who was perhaps one of his relatives. Lupus fell to a Marsic ambush on 11 June 90 BC while crossing the river Tolenus; Marius, commanding a different wing of the army, was yet able to drive the enemy back with heavy losses. The senate, after Lupus' death, appointed Marius in joint command with the praetor Quintus Servilius Caepio; Caepio, however, quickly fell to a Marsic act of perfidy, leaving Marius in sole command. After taking command over the northern front of the war, Marius moved energetically forward, defeating the Marsi with his former legate Sulla's help on hilly ground south of the Fucine Lake; Herius Asinius, a praetor of the Marrucini, was among the slain. According to Plutarch, Marius then entered a state of inaction and refused to pursue – probably because he did not trust his men – which led Poppaedius Silo to challenge him: "So if you are such a great general, Marius, why not come down [from your fortifications] and fight?" To this Marius retorted, "Well, if you think you are any good a general, why don't you try to make me?"

The next year saw Marius relieved by Lucius Porcius Cato, one of the consuls, and him excluded from command. We do not know why for sure he was not given another command: "his age should have been outweighed by his experience". It may be possible that Marius had relinquished command on account of illness or had been relieved under a perception of insufficient aggressiveness. The war was immensely hard fought but drew to an end within the next few years, as the Romans brought the lex Julia in 90 BC, granting citizenship to all the allies who were loyal or would otherwise promptly put down arms. Marius's efforts in the conflict brought him few honours, though he served at a senior level and won at least a few victories. In all likelihood, this experience rekindled his desire for further commands and glory, embarking him upon a path towards seeking command in the east.

=== Sulla and the First Civil War ===
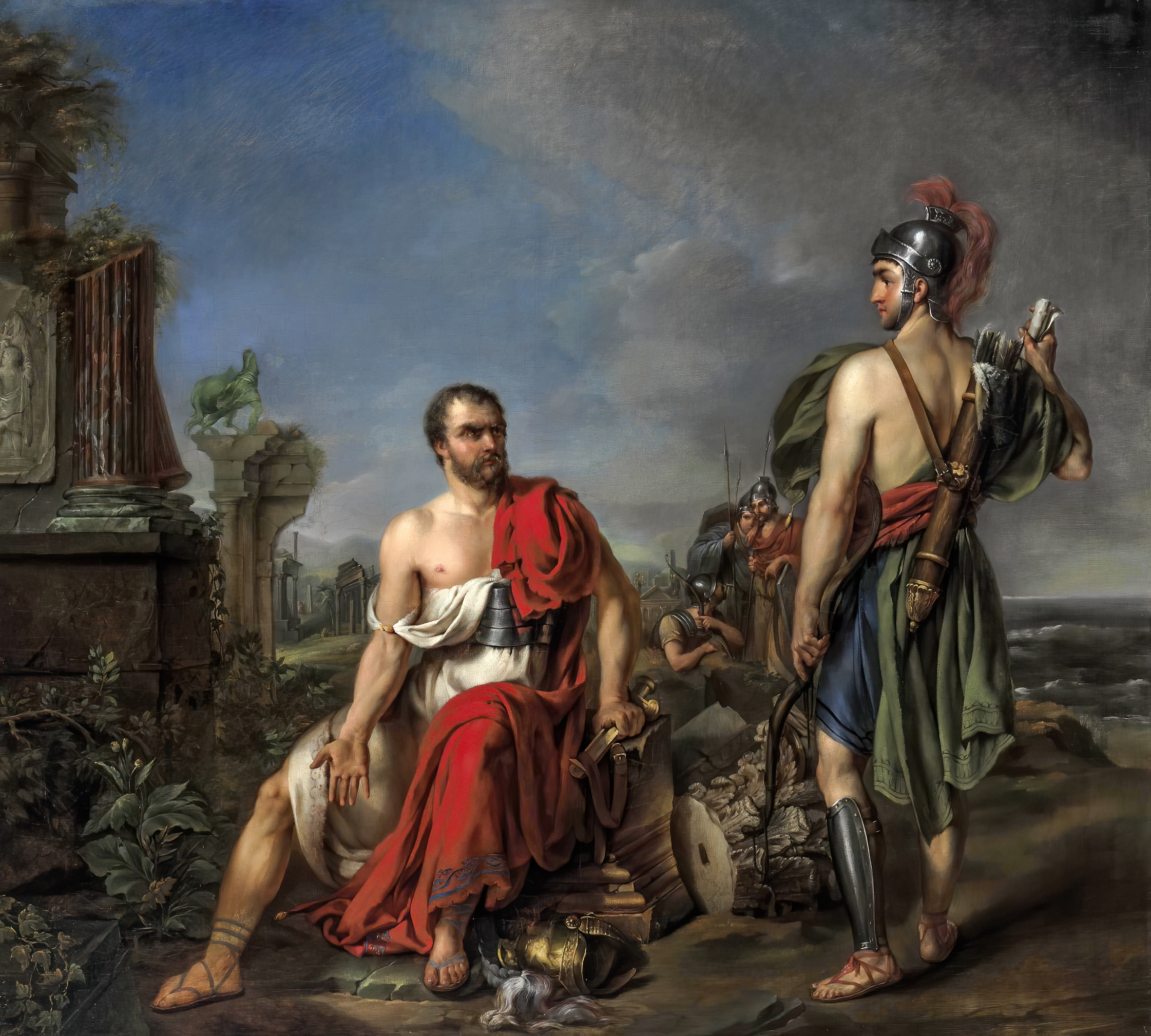
Exiled Gaius Marius sitting among the ruins of Carthage, by Joseph Kremer

During the Social War, one of Marius's clients and friends, Manius Aquillius, had apparently encouraged the kingdoms of Nicomedia and Bithynia to invade Pontus. In response King Mithridates of Pontus invaded both kingdoms as well as the Roman holdings in Asia (in present-day western Turkey). Defeating the meagre forces at Aquillius's disposal, Mithridates marched across the Bosphorus and Aquillius retreated to Lesbos. With the Social War concluded and with the prospects of a glorious and fabulously rich conquest, there was significant competition in the consular elections for 88 BC. Eventually, Lucius Cornelius Sulla was elected consul, and received command of the army being sent to Pontus.

After news of Mithridates' actions reached Rome, Marius may have considered a seventh term as consul. A tribune, Publius Sulpicius Rufus, was also working on proposals to distribute the new Italian citizens into the thirty-five voting tribes. Marius was likely the one pushing for this most, while also positioning himself for a seventh consulship and – when bundled with Sulpicius's other voting reforms – a long-lasting political base. Sulpicius's proposals raised a furore in the forum, leading to a riot in which the consul – Sulla – was forced to shelter in Marius's house, where a compromise was reached allowing the voting bill to pass through and for Sulla to prepare to go east.

After Sulla left Rome to prepare for his army in Nola to depart for the east, Sulpicius had his measures passed into law, and tacked on a rider which unprecedentedly appointed Marius – now a private citizen lacking any office in the Republic – to the command in Pontus. Marius then sent two of his legates to take the command from Sulla. These moves were foolish: Evans notes "Marius's political ingenuity seems to have deserted him" and calls his actions rash. Sulla refused to relinquish his post, even though all but one of his own subordinates opposed Sulla's course of action. After killing Marius's legates, Sulla rallied his troops to his personal banner and called upon them to defend him against the insults of the Marian faction. The ancient sources say that Sulla's soldiers pledged their loyalty because they were worried that they would be kept in Italy while Marius raised troops from his own veterans who would then proceed to plunder great riches. Marius's faction sent two tribunes to Sulla's legions in eastern Italy, but the tribunes were promptly murdered by Sulla's troops.

Sulla then ordered his troops to begin a slow march on Rome. This was a momentous event, unforeseen by Marius, as no Roman army had ever marched upon Rome: it was forbidden by law and ancient tradition. Once it became obvious that Sulla was going to defy the law and seize Rome by force, Marius attempted to organise a defence of the city with gladiators. Unsurprisingly, Marius's ad hoc force was no match for Sulla's legions. Marius was defeated and fled the city. He narrowly escaped capture and death on several occasions and eventually found safety with his veterans in Africa. Sulla and his supporters in the Senate proscribed twelve men, and passed a death sentence on Marius, Marius's son, Sulpicius and a few other allies. Sulpicius was executed but, according to Plutarch, many Romans disapproved of Sulla's actions.

Some who opposed Sulla were elected to office in 87 BC – Gnaeus Octavius, a supporter of Sulla, and Lucius Cornelius Cinna, a supporter of Marius and member of Sulla's extended family, were elected consuls – as Sulla wanted to demonstrate his republican bona fides. Regardless, Sulla was again confirmed as the commander of the campaign against Mithridates, so he took his legions out of Rome and marched east to war.

=== Seventh consulship and death ===
While Sulla was on campaign in Greece, fighting broke out between the conservative supporters of Sulla, led by Octavius, and the popular supporters of Cinna over voting rights for the Italians. When Cinna was forced to flee the city by Octavius's gangs, he was able to rally significant Italian support: some 10 legions including the Samnites. Marius along with his son then returned from exile in Africa to Etruria with an army he had raised there, and they placed themselves under Cinna's command to oust Octavius. Marius demanded the tribunes lift his banishment by passage of law. Cinna's vastly superior army coerced the Senate into opening the gates of the city.

They entered Rome and started to purge a number of their opponents, including Octavius. Their heads were exhibited in the Forum. Fourteen of the victims, including six former consuls, were noteworthy individuals: Lucius Licinius Crassus (older brother of the triumvir), Gaius Atilius Serranus, Marcus Antonius, Lucius Julius Caesar, his brother Caesar Strabo, Quintus Mucius Scaevola the Augur, Publius Cornelius Lentulus, Gaius Nemotorius, Gaius Baebius and Octavius Ruso. A number of those targeted by the purge were not immediately killed: show trials were set up before the victims committed suicide. Marius and Cinna also declared Sulla an enemy of the state and stripped him of his proconsular command in the east.

While Marius and Cinna were both responsible for the deaths and the headed pikes in the forum, it is unlikely that Marius and his men killed everyone in their paths, as reported in Cassius Dio and Plutarch. The killings, more likely, served to terrorise the political opposition. With competitors suitably frightened, show elections were held for 86 BC, (Note: Smith believes that the account in Livy's Periochae is confused, in part due to misuse of the verb renuntio therein, preferring the tradition in Plutarch and Appian instead. Smith 2017, pp. 44–46.) with Marius and Cinna being elected by the comitia centuriata irregularly. Within a fortnight of assuming the consulship for the seventh time, Marius was dead.

Plutarch relates several opinions on the end of Marius: one, from Posidonius, holds that Marius contracted pleurisy; Gaius Piso has it that Marius walked with his friends and discussed all of his accomplishments with them, adding that no intelligent man ought leave himself to fortune. Plutarch then anonymously relates that Marius, having gone into a fit of passion in which he announced in a delusionary manner that he was in command of the Mithridatic War, began to act as he would have on the field of battle; finally, Plutarch relates that, ever an ambitious man, Marius lamented on his deathbed that he had not achieved all of which he was capable, despite his having acquired great wealth and having been chosen consul more times than any man before him.

After his death, Lucius Valerius Flaccus, another patrician like Cinna, was elected as the sole candidate to succeed Marius as consul; Flaccus was dispatched immediately with two legions to fight Mithridates alongside (but not with) Sulla. While Marius is at times blamed for the purges, his sudden death more than likely was used to deflect blame, avoiding an actual change in policy. Cinna and one of his later consular colleagues, Carbo, would lead their faction into the civil war, which continued until their defeat (and that of Marius's son) by Sulla's army, eventually allowing Sulla to make himself dictator.

== Legacy ==
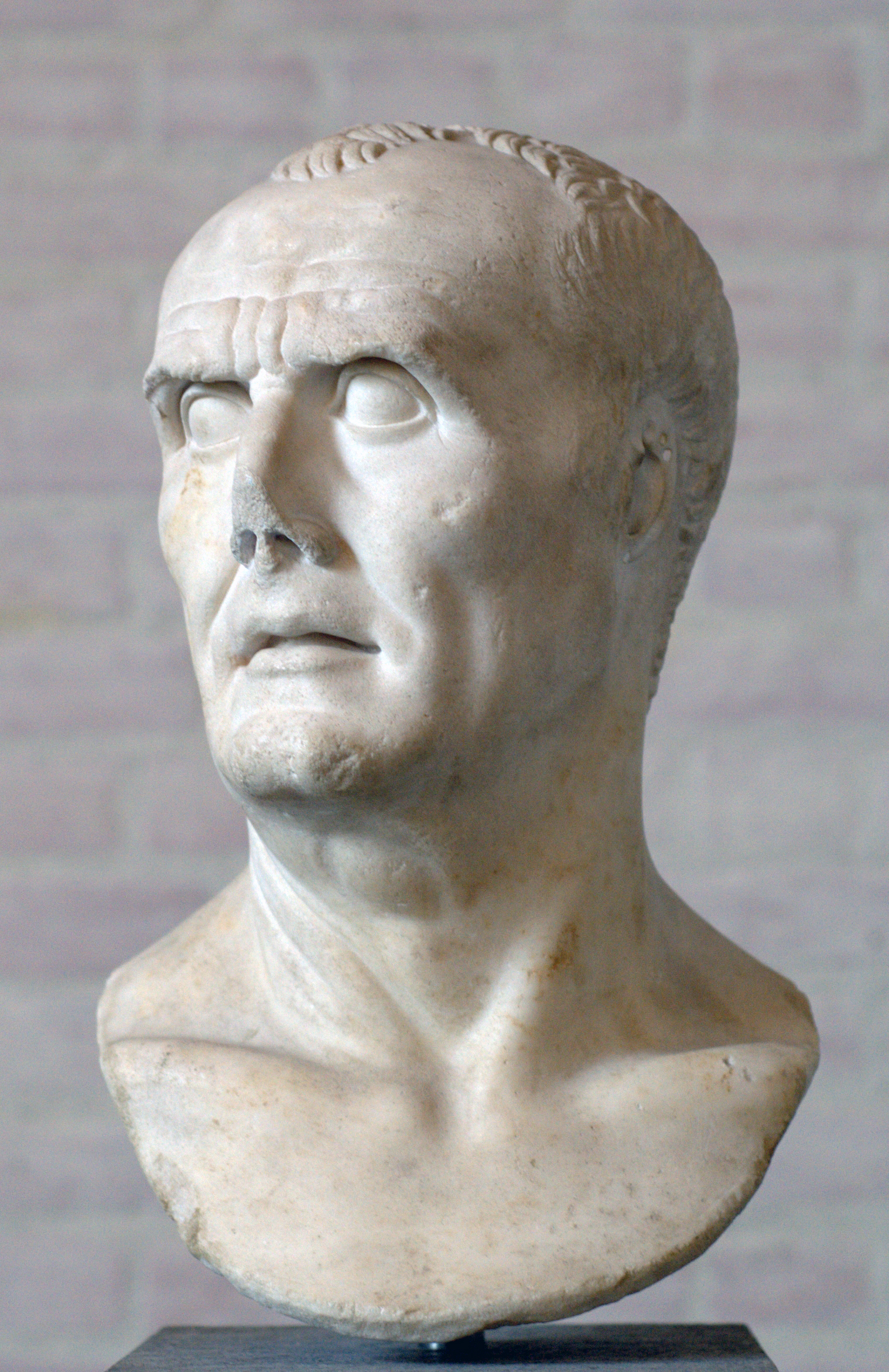
Bust formerly identified as Marius, likely depicting instead Scipio Asiaticus.

Marius was an extremely successful Roman general and politician. In ancient sources, he has been repeatedly characterised as having unending ambition and opportunism. (Note: This is especially the case of Marius's characterisation in the narratives of both Sallust and Plutarch. Plutarch especially, as he relied partially on Sulla's (now lost) memoirs as a source.) Plutarch says of him:

if Marius could have been persuaded to sacrifice to the Greek Muses and Graces, he would not have put the ugliest possible crown upon a most illustrious career in field and forum, nor have been driven by the blasts of passion, ill-timed ambition, and insatiable greed upon the shore of a most cruel and savage old age.

According to Evans this characterisation is not entirely fair, because Marius's attempts to win the consulship and for self-aggrandisement were not out of the norm for politicians of the middle to late Republic. Marius's legacy is heavily defined by his example: his five successive consulships, while seen at the time as necessary for the survival of Roman civilisation, gave unprecedented power into the hands of a single man over a never-before-seen length of time.

However, that Marius died "so hated by contemporaries is really rather unremarkable, because to his unrealistic, even senile, dreams of further triumphs may be laid the prime cause for the disastrous civil war of 87 [BC]... His unquenchable ambitio overcame an unusually astute sense of judgement; the result, the beginning of the Roman revolution". Broadly, "traditional republican culture had been based on the principles of equality between colleagues in office and short terms of office holding... the inherited republic could not survive Marius and his ambitions".

=== Supposed reforms to the legions ===
In the narratives of Plutarch and Sallust, Marius's reforms to the recruitment process for the Roman legions are roundly criticised for creating a soldiery wholly loyal to their generals and beholden to their beneficence or ability to secure payment from the state. However, Evans argues this development did not emerge from Marius, and it was likely initially envisioned as nothing more than a temporary measure to meet the extraordinary threats of Numidia and the Cimbrian tribes. Moreover, the armies in the late republic were broadly similar to those of the middle republic.

The willingness of the soldiers to kill fellow Romans changed after the Social War: "if Sulla's army had been unwilling to march on Rome... then the outcome would obviously have been completely different, no matter how power-hungry Marius or Sulla were". The Social War had the related effect of breaking down the Roman government's legitimacy. Lintott, in the Cambridge Ancient History, similarly writes that "Roman armies were only to be used for civil war after their scruples had been drowned in a blood-bath of fighting with their own Italian allies... it may as well be argued that civil war created the self-seeking unprincipled soldier".

There were political effects, however, to the promise of land after service: the decision to call up the proletarii would not be fully felt until the time to draw down the troops. As the spoils of war became increasingly inadequate as compensation for the soldiers – the spoils of war do not guarantee a long term stream of income – it became common practice to allocate land (generally abroad) for the foundation of veterans' colonies. Political unrest over veterans' land bonuses in the first century BC, however, is exaggerated: soldiers both in the Marian and post-Marian periods largely went home peacefully when land demands were not immediately met. Moreover, through the post-Marian period, land distributions were sporadic and volunteers were taken on with no promises or reasonable expectations of land at discharge. It was only by the second half of the last century BC that veteran demands for land had become an expectation, later fulfilled by the Second Triumvirate.

=== Assemblies and foreign affairs ===
Marius's repeated use of the assemblies to overturn senatorial assignments to commands had significant negative effects on the stability of the state. The senate generally used sortition to choose generals for command posts, removing the conflict of interest between consuls. Marius's use of the Assemblies to remove Metellus from command in Numidia spelled an end to collective governance in foreign affairs. In later years, use of plebiscita became the main means by which commands were granted to other generals, adding to personal rivalries and diminishing the ability to govern the state. The size of the rewards gained from manipulating the Assemblies was irresistible to future generations of ambitious politicians.

The similar use of the Assemblies in an attempt to replace Sulla with Marius for the Mithridatic War was unprecedented, as never before had laws been passed to confer commands on someone lacking any official title in the state. Marius's legal strategy misfired disastrously because he failed to predict Sulla's reaction of marching on the city to protect his command:

It was plainly expected that Sulpicius's bill and the sanctity of the law, even if much abused, would be obeyed without question... Sulla's unforeseen rejection of the 'popular' will, which he must surely have believed to have been of equivocal legality, was made from a position of great strength since he had the means and the opportunity to impose his will on the situation.

=== Political violence ===
While political violence had been increasingly normalised throughout the middle and late Republic, starting with the murder of the Gracchi brothers, the passage of the senatus consultum ultimum against Saturninus and Glaucia in Marius's sixth consulship created a precedent justifying the use of force against fellow magistrates. Prior to the events of 100 BC, such decrees had only been moved against private citizens. Even if those magistrates were seditious, their deaths in the senate house undermined senatorial legitimacy and made it more difficult for the senate to govern effectively.

Moreover, Marius's attempts to undermine Sulla's command at the start of the First Mithridatic War massively expanded the scope of that violence. No longer would only mobs clash in the streets of Rome. No longer would personal grudges be pursued by mere political prosecutions in the courts: (Note: E.g., the extortion and treason courts set up by Saturninus and Gaius Mamilius's Mamilian commission.) political enemies would be killed. (Note: See both Sulla's and Marius's purges in 88 and 87, respectively, after they captured the city under arms.) The use of the assemblies eroded senatorial control which, along with Sulla's decision to march on Rome, created significant and prolonged instability, only resolved by the destruction of the Republican form of government and the transition to Empire.

== Timeline ==
Years are from Broughton 1952, p. 589.

== Offices ==
=== Table ===
The following table is sourced from Broughton 1952, p. 589.

Year (BC)	Office	Colleague	Comment
121?	Quaestor		
119	Tribune of the plebs		
115	Praetor		
114	Promagistrate (pro praetore?)		Farther Spain
109–08	Legate (lieutenant)		Under Metellus in Numidia
107	Consul	Lucius Cassius Longinus	Numidia
106–05	Proconsul		Numidia
104–01	Consul	Gaius Flavius Fimbria (104); Lucius Aurelius Orestes (103); Quintus Lutatius Catulus (102); Manius Aquillius (101)	Cimbri and Teutones
100	Consul	Lucius Valerius Flaccus	Saturninus and Glaucia
97	Legate (ambassador)		
90?	Legate (lieutenant)		Social War
88–87	Proconsul		Social War
86	Consul	Lucius Cornelius Cinna	Died shortly after taking office

=== Consulships ===
Political offices
Preceded by Ser. Sulpicius Galba; M. Aurelius Scaurus	Roman consul 107 BC; With: L. Cassius Longinus	Succeeded by Q. Servilius Caepio; C. Atilius Serranus
Preceded by P. Rutilius Rufus; Cn. Mallius Maximus	Roman consul 104–100 BC; With: C. Flavius Fimbria; L. Aurelius Orestes; Q. Lutatius Catulus; Manius Aquillius; L. Valerius Flaccus	Succeeded by M. Antonius; A. Postumius Albinus
Preceded by Cn. Octavius; L. Cornelius Cinna	Roman consul 86 BC; With: L. Cornelius Cinna	Succeeded by L. Valerius Flaccus as suffect
