= Marcus Livius Drusus =

Marcus Livius Drusus may refer to:

- Marcus Livius Drusus Aemilianus, father of the general Gaius Livius Drusus and Marcus Livius Drusus the consul of 147 BC
- Marcus Livius Drusus, Roman consul in 147 BC
- Marcus Livius Drusus, Roman reformer and adoptive grandfather of empress Livia
- Marcus Livius Drusus Claudianus, father of empress Livia
- Marcus Livius Drusus Libo, adoptive brother of empress Livia
