= Livia gens =

Ancient Roman family

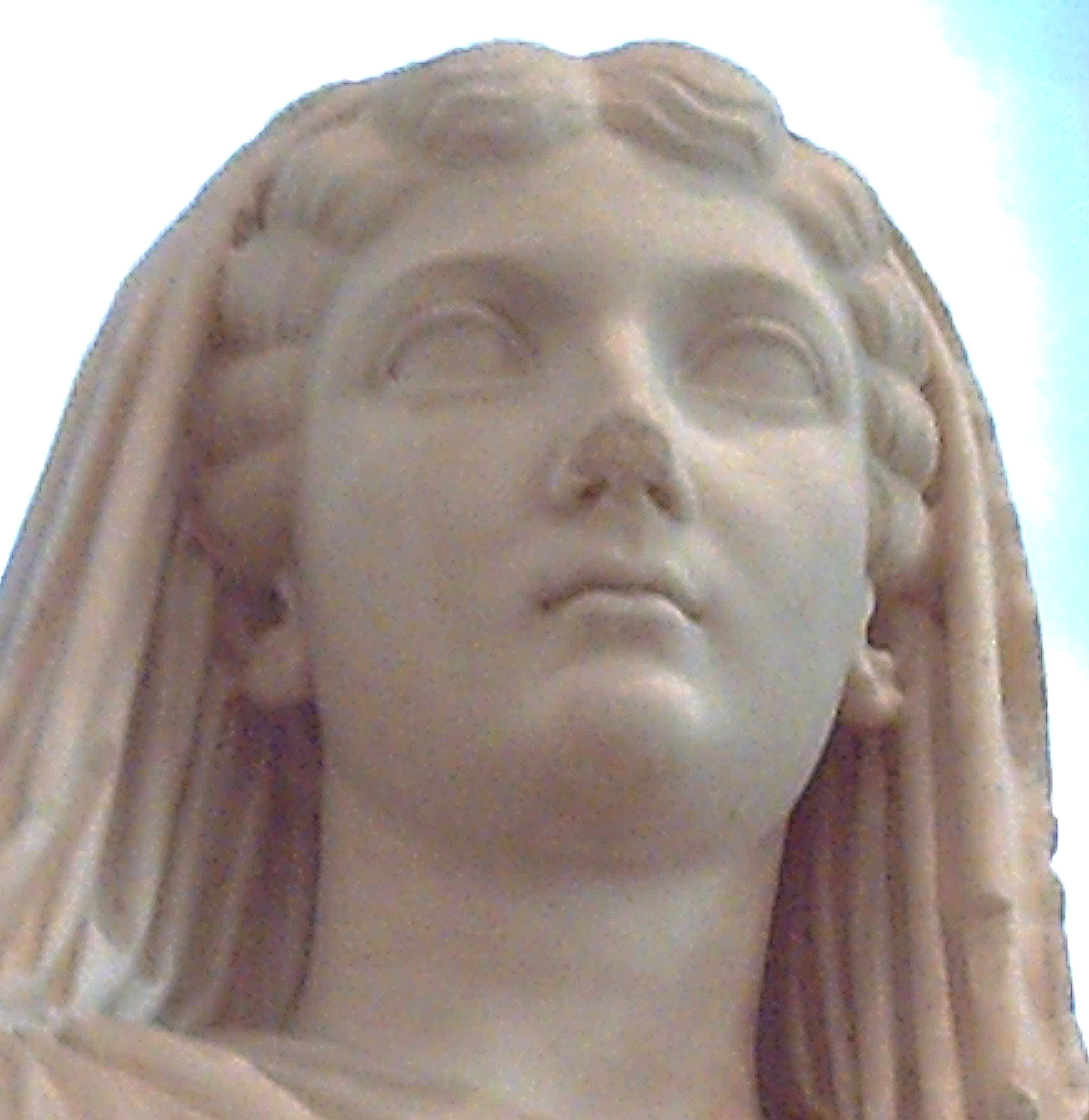
Livia Drusilla, wife of the emperor Augustus.

The gens Livia was an illustrious plebeian family of ancient Rome. The first of the Livii to obtain the consulship was Marcus Livius Denter in 302 BC, and from his time the Livii supplied the Republic with eight consuls, two censors, a dictator, and a master of the horse. Members of the gens were honoured with three triumphs. In the reign of Augustus, Livia Drusilla was Roman empress, and her son was the emperor Tiberius.

== Origin ==
History preserves no traditions concerning the origin of the Livian gens. Although its members are not found in the first two centuries of the Republic, there is nothing in particular to suggest a foreign origin. The regular cognomina of the Livii are all Latin. The nomen Livius is generally supposed to be derived from the same root as liveo, lividus, and livor, all with the meaning of leaden or bluish-grey, but this connection is not absolutely certain. Pokorny dismissed this derivation, arguing that the nomen either predated these words, or could not be linguistically connected with them. He hypothesized an Etruscan origin for the Livii.

== Branches and cognomina ==
The cognomina of the Livii during the Republic were Denter, Drusus, Libo, Macatus, and Salinator. Of these, Denter was a common surname originally referring to someone with prominent teeth. Macatus means "spotted", being derived from the same root as macula.

Drusus probably means "stiff", although Suetonius records a tradition that the first of the name received it after slaying a Gallic chieftain named Drausus. If this is the true origin of the name, then it probably dates the story to the year 283 BC, when the Senones, the Gallic people of whom Drausus was said to be the leader, were defeated and scattered, for the most part vacating northern Italy. Libo, derived from libere, designated a libation pourer, and entered the family from the Scribonia gens, one of whom was adopted by the Livii Drusi.

The surname Salinator, meaning a salt-merchant, (Note: The word came to mean a money-dealer or banker, as salt was a valuable commodity, and a common medium of exchange. Salt-works were generally termed salinae, but the district of Salinae at the foot of the Aventine Hill was probably the place where salt from Ostia was offloaded and sold. "Salinae... does not refer to the salt fields, since the coastline is located nearly thirty kilometres away, but rather to a site for unloading, stocking and supplying the precious product.") is said to have been given in derision to Marcus Livius, who as censor in 204 BC, imposed an unpopular salt tax. A question arises from the fact that Marcus' father is also referred to as Salinator, although the historians may simply have applied the cognomen retroactively.

== Members ==
This list includes abbreviated praenomina. For an explanation of this practice, see filiation.

=== Early Livii ===
- Gaius Livius, grandfather of the consul of 302 BC, may have been the magister equitum of 348.
- Lucius Livius, tribune of the plebs in 320 BC, the year after the disaster at the Caudine Forks. The consul, Albinus, had pledged himself and the other Roman magistrates as guarantors of the peace, in order to preserve the lives of the Roman army. Livius and one of his colleagues resisted the demand to turn themselves over to the Samnites as hostages, as they had nothing to do with the agreement, and moreover were sacrosanct as tribunes, the entire body of the Roman people obliged to defend them; but Postumius browbeat them until they agreed to become hostages. However, the Samnites rejected the hostages, when they realised that the Romans were bound to continue the war with or without them.
- Marcus Livius Denter, consul in 302 BC. Previously he had been one of the pontiffs chosen from the plebeians to augment the numbers of that college.

=== Livii Drusi ===
- Livius Drusus, according to Suetonius, a propraetor in Gaul, who defeated the chieftain Drausus in single combat, thereby earning his surname. He brought back the gold taken by the Senones as the price of departing Rome in 390 BC, thereby avenging the Gallic sack of the city. Pighius conjectures that he was the son of Marcus Livius Denter, consul in 302 BC, which would agree with the probable date of his struggle with Drausus, in 283.
- Marcus Livius M. f. Drusus Aemilianus or Mamilianus, father of the consul of 147. His agnomen suggests, but does not prove, that he was adopted from either the Aemilii or the Mamilii. (Note: Which version of his name is correct is uncertain, as the Fasti Capitolini are broken in the place where his name appears. As for whether he was the natural or adopted son of Marcus Livius Drusus, an agnomen such as Aemilianus or Mamilianus typically indicates adoption, but it could also signify descent through the female line, particularly if his father were married more than once.)
- Gaius Livius M. f. M. n. Drusus, consul in 147 BC. Either he or his son Gaius should probably be identified with the jurist of this name.
- Gaius Livius C. f. M. n. Drusus, known for his friendliness, courtesy, and persuasiveness, which he shared with his brother. Some identify him, instead of his father, as the jurist of this name. (Note: Pighius confuses him with Livius Drusus Claudianus, the grandson of Marcus and grandfather of the emperor Tiberius; Mai supposes that a certain graffitic barb aimed at the Drusi ("this law binds all the people but the two Drusi"), recorded by Diodorus, refers to Marcus and his father, but it seems much more likely that it was aimed at two brothers.)
- Marcus Livius C. f. M. n. Drusus, tribune of the plebs in 122 BC, opposed the measures of his colleague, Gaius Gracchus, and undermined his authority by proposing similar measures for which the optimates, the aristocratic party of the Senate could take credit. He was consul in 112, and perhaps triumphed over the Scordisci in the following year. He is probably the censor of 109 BC, who died during his year of office.
- Livia C. f. M. n., daughter of the consul of 147 BC. She married Publius Rutilius Rufus and became the mother of Publius Rutilius Nudus. She was noted by the Roman historians Valerius Maximus and Pliny for her longevity, both recorded that she lived to be 97.
- Marcus Livius M. f. C. n. Drusus, one of the most influential figures in Roman politics in the years leading up to the Social War. He went to great lengths to win over the Senate, espousing the party of the optimates, but then as tribune of the plebs in BC 91, he sought to conciliate the people by passing the various measures of the Gracchi. He won over the socii by promising them the rights of Roman citizenship, and passed a law to fill up the ranks of the Senate with equites. But he made a violent enemy of the consul, Lucius Marcius Philippus, who had his measures declared void ab initio. Drusus was assassinated in his house just as civil war began to break out.
- (Gaius) Livius M. f. C. n. Drusus, afterwards Mamercus Aemilius Lepidus Livianus, consul in 77 BC, was brother of the tribune Marcus and adopted into the Aemilii Lepidi. He was a supporter of Sulla's party, the optimates, but was one of those who had persuaded Sulla to spare the life of the future dictator, Julius Caesar.
- Livia M. f. C. n., sister of the tribune, married Quintus Servilius Caepio, whose sister, Servilia, married Drusus. Caepio became her brother's bitter opponent, and she divorced him, marrying Marcus Porcius Cato. Her sons were Gnaeus Servilius Caepio and Cato the Younger; her eldest daughter Servilia Major was the mistress of Julius Caesar as well as the mother of Brutus and mother-in-law of Cassius, the assassins of Caesar; her middle daughter was Servilia Minor the wife of Lucullus; her youngest daughter Porcia married Lucius Domitius Ahenobarbus the consul of 54 BC and became the ancestress of emperor Nero.
- Livia (M. f. M. n.), a woman who expressed interest in adopting Publius Cornelius Dolabella the consul of 44 BC. She may have been a daughter of Drusus the tribune of 91 BC and Servilia.
- Marcus Livius M. f. M. n. Drusus Claudianus, born as Appius Claudius Pulcher, was adopted by one of the Livii Drusi, apparently the tribune Marcus. (Note: Pighius, followed by Vaillant, makes him the son of Gaius Livius Drusus, consul in 147 BC, which cannot be justified on chronological grounds.) He was thus connected with Brutus and Cassius, two whom he allied himself after the death of Caesar. Proscribed by the triumvirs, he took his own life after the Battle of Philippi. He was the father of Livia Drusilla, Roman empress, and the grandfather of Tiberius.
- Gaius Livius (M. f. M. n. Drusus), possibly the son of Claudianus and elder brother of empress Livia. His existence can be inferred from an inscription of his daughter Livia C. f. Pulchra. He might have died before 42 as his father adopted another son before he died at the Battle of Philippi.
- Livia M. f. M. n. Drusilla, married first Tiberius Claudius Nero, and second Octavian, the future emperor Augustus. She was the mother of the emperor Tiberius, and of the general Drusus the Elder, as well as the grandmother and great-grandmother of the emperors Claudius and Caligula, both of whom she helped raise.
- Marcus Livius M. f. M. n. Drusus Libo, apparently born a member of the Scribonii Libones, and adopted by one of the Livii Drusi, generally supposed to be Claudianus, although there are several uncertain details in his relationships to the other Livii Drusi and Scribonii. He was aedile about 28 BC, and consul in 15 BC.
- Livia C. f. (M. n.) Pulchra, a woman recorded in inscription who based on her name is presumed to have been a granddaughter of Drusus Claudianus and niece of empress Livia.
- Livia M. f. M. n. "Scriboniana", daughter of Marcus Livius Drusus Libo and mother of Livia Medullina, the fiancee of the young Claudius who died before they could be married.
- Lucius Scribonius Libo Drusus, generally supposed to be the son (or grandson) of Marcus Livius Drusus Libo, was induced by the Senator and delator Firmius Catus to consult soothsayers with respect to his chances of attaining the empire. At first the accusations were ignored by Tiberius, but then he was brought to trial and, finding no hope of vindication, he took his own life.

=== Livii Salinatores ===
- Marcus Livius M. f. M. n. (Salinator), father of the consul, was decemvir sacris faciundis in 236 BC. Either he or perhaps his son purchased an educated Greek, named Andronicus, as a tutor for his children; once freed, Andronicus became the founder of Roman drama.
- Marcus Livius M. f. M. n. Salinator, was consul during the Second Illyrian War, and despite triumphing over the enemy, he was afterward charged with misappropriating the spoils of war, and sent into exile. During the Second Punic War he was induced to return and resume his seat in the Senate, although he rarely spoke, except to speak on behalf of his kinsman, Marcus Livius Macatus. Consul for the second time in 207, he and his colleague, Gaius Claudius Nero, defeated and slew Hasdrubal, the brother of Hannibal, before the two could unite their forces, and he triumphed for the second time. He was appointed dictator the following year to host the elections, and censor in 204, but he and his colleague quarreled severely. He may have been the adoptive father of Marcus Livius Drusus Aemilianus.
- Gaius Livius M. f. M. n. Salinator, praetor in 202 BC, and again in 191, when he had command of the fleet in the War against Antiochus, and defeated the Seleucid admiral, Polyxenidas. He was consul in 188.
- Lucius (Livius) Salinator, (Note: The ancient source gives his nomen as Julius, which Broughton amends to Livius.) a supporter of Sertorius in Spain, was betrayed and murdered in 81 BC while trying to hold the Pyrenees against a hostile army.

=== Livii Ocellae ===
- Lucius Livius Ocella, pardoned by Caesar at Thapsus.
- Lucius Livius L. f. Ocella, quaestor in Spain in 42 BC, was the step-grandfather of the emperor Galba.
- Servius Livius (L. f.) Ocella, a senator in 50 BC, was likely a brother of the quaestor Lucius Ocella.
- Gaius Livius L. f. Ocella, a resident of Vescia, might possibly be identified with Lucius Ocella the quaestor, but Broughton believed them to be separate people.
- Livia L. f. L. n. Ocellina, the step-mother (and possibly adoptive mother) of Galba.
- Lucius Livius Ocella Sulpicius Galba, better known as Servius Sulpicius Galba, emperor from AD 68 to 69.

=== Others ===
- Lucius Livius Andronicus, originally an educated but enslaved Greek named Andronicus, he was purchased by a Marcus Livius Salinator as a tutor for his children. On his manumission, he assumed the name Lucius Livius Andronicus. He was a renowned poet, and the founder of Roman drama.
- Marcus Livius, member of the plenipotentiary board sent to Carthage after the fall of Saguntum in 219 BC to inquire if Hannibal's attack on it had been authorized and declare war if Hannibal could not be brought to justice. He was married to the daughter of Pacuvius Calavius, chief magistrate of Capua in 217 BC. Pacuvius was a patrician who had married a daughter of Appius Claudius.
- Marcus Livius Macatus, placed by the propraetor Marcus Valerius Laevinus in charge of the garrison at Tarentum in 214 BC, during the Second Punic War. When the town was lost to a surprise attack in 212, Livius and his soldiers retreated to the citadel, where they held out until the city was retaken by Quintus Fabius Maximus in 209. On the question of whether Livius should be punished or rewarded for his conduct, Fabius replied that he could not have recaptured Tarentum but for Livius' actions.
- Gaius Livius, minted coins of Vesci in Baetica and was possibly legate in 40 BC under Octavian and Mark Antony.
- Gaius Livius, possibly the father of the historian.
- Titus Livius, the historian Livy, flourished during the last decades of the Republic, and through the reign of Augustus. He wrote nothing of his family, and other historians have contributed only that he was from Patavium, and that he had at least one son, and a daughter who married a certain Lucius Magius. Two inscriptions from Patavium in the Corpus Inscriptionum Latinarum are thought to mark the resting place of Livy and several members of his family.
- Titus Livius T. f. Priscus, thought to be the historian's elder son.
- Titus Livius T. f. Longus, perhaps the historian's younger son.
- Livia T. f. Quarta, perhaps a daughter of the historian. If she is the same daughter who married Lucius Magius, there is no indication of it on her monument.
- Titus Livius Liviae Quartae l. Halys, freedman of Livia Quarta. His funeral plaque was unearthed at the monastery of St. Justina at Padua in 1360, followed in 1413 by the excavation of a lead coffin in the same location, containing a human skeleton. Owing to a misunderstanding of the tablet's inscription, the remains were supposed to belong to the historian, rather than a freedman, until further excavations at Padua explained the inscription's true meaning.
- Livia Spendusa, freedwoman of a Livia Livilla. Both women were probably from Italy, and lived during the early imperial period.

== Later uses ==
- In European languages, Livia is still an ordinary girls' name. In Romanian, the form is Liviu.
- The town of Forlì in Emilia-Romagna, Italy, is named after Livius Salinator, its legendary founder. The original name was Forum Livii.

== See also ==
- List of Roman gentes
- Claudia gens

== Bibliography ==
- Polybius, Historiae (The Histories).
- Marcus Tullius Cicero, Brutus, Cato Maior de Senectute, De Finibus Bonorum et Malorum, De Officiis, De Oratore, Epistulae ad Atticum, Tusculanae Quaestiones.
- Diodorus Siculus, Bibliotheca Historica (Library of History).
- Titus Livius (Livy), History of Rome.
- Marcus Velleius Paterculus, Compendium of Roman History.
- Valerius Maximus, Factorum ac Dictorum Memorabilium (Memorable Facts and Sayings).
- Lucius Annaeus Seneca (Seneca the Younger), Epistulae Morales ad Lucilium (Moral Letters to Lucilius).
- Gaius Plinius Secundus (Pliny the Elder), Naturalis Historia (Natural History).
- Marcus Fabius Quintilianus (Quintilian), Institutio Oratoria (Institutes of Oratory).
- Lucius Mestrius Plutarchus (Plutarch), Lives of the Noble Greeks and Romans, Moralia.
- Gaius Suetonius Tranquillus, De Vita Caesarum (Lives of the Caesars, or The Twelve Caesars).
- Lucius Annaeus Florus, Epitome de T. Livio Bellorum Omnium Annorum DCC (Epitome of Livy: All the Wars of Seven Hundred Years).
- Appianus Alexandrinus (Appian), Bellum Civile (The Civil War), Bellum Hannibalicum (The War with Hannibal), Bellum Illyricum (The Illyrian Wars), Syriaca (The Syrian Wars).
- Lucius Cassius Dio Cocceianus (Cassius Dio), Roman History.
- Julius Obsequens, Liber de Prodigiis (The Book of Prodigies).
- Sextus Aurelius Victor, De Viris Illustribus (On Famous Men).
- Eusebius Sophronius Hieronymus (St. Jerome), In Chronicon Eusebii (The Chronicon of Eusebius).
- Stephanus Winandus Pighius, Annales Magistratuum Romanorum, Antwerp (1599–1615).
- Jean Foy-Vaillant, Numismata Imperatorum Romanorum Praestantiora a Julio Caesare ad Postumus (Outstanding Imperial Coins from Caesar to Postumus), Giovanni Battista Bernabò & Giuseppe Lazzarini, Rome (1674, 1743).
- Guilielmus Grotius, De Vitae Jurisconsultorum (Lives of the Jurists), Felix Lopez, Brittenburg (1690).
- Bernardinus Rutilius, Vitae Tripartitae Jurisconsultorum Veterum (The Lives of the Jurists), Magdeburg (1718).
- Angelo Mai (Angelus Maius), Scriptorum Veterum Nova Collectio, e Vaticanus Codicibus Edita (New Collection of Ancient Writers, Compiled from the Vatican Collection), Vatican Press, Rome (1825–1838).
- Dictionary of Greek and Roman Biography and Mythology, William Smith, ed., Little, Brown and Company, Boston (1849).
- Dictionary of Greek and Roman Antiquities, William Smith, ed., Little, Brown, and Company, Boston (1859).
- Theodor Mommsen et alii, Corpus Inscriptionum Latinarum (The Body of Latin Inscriptions, abbreviated "CIL"), Berlin-Brandenburgische Akademie der Wissenschaften (1853–present).
- Sabine Baring-Gould, The Tragedy of the Caesars: A Study of the Characters of the Caesars of the Julian and Claudian Houses, Methuen (1892).
- George Davis Chase, "The Origin of Roman Praenomina", in Harvard Studies in Classical Philology, vol. VIII (1897).
- Alois Walde, Lateinisches Etymologisches Wörterbuch, Carl Winter's Universitäts Büchhandlung, Heidelberg (1906).
- Friedrich Münzer, Römische Adelsparteien und Adelsfamilien (Roman Aristocratic Parties and Families), Stuttgart, 1920 (T. Ridley, trans., 1999).
- T. Robert S. Broughton, The Magistrates of the Roman Republic, American Philological Association (1952).
- Indogermanisches Etymologisches Wörterbuch, Leiden University (1959).
- John C. Traupman, The New College Latin & English Dictionary, Bantam Books, New York (1995).
- Alexandre Grandazzi, The Foundation of Rome: Myth and History, Cornell University Press, Ithaca, New York (1997).
- Rosella Carloni et alii, L'architettura del sacro in età romana Paesaggi, modelli, forme e comunicazione, Gangemi Editore (2016) ISBN 9788849260915.
- Maxwell Craven, The Imperial Families of Ancient Rome, Fonthill Media (2019).
