= Drusus =

Drusus may refer to:

- Gaius Livius Drusus (jurist), son of the Roman consul of 147 BC
- Marcus Livius Drusus (consul) (155–108 BC), opponent of populist reformer Gaius Gracchus
- Marcus Livius Drusus (reformer) (died 91 BC), whose assassination led to the Social War (91–87 BC)
- Nero Claudius Drusus ("Drusus I", 38–9 BC), brother of Roman emperor Tiberius
- Drusus Julius Caesar ("Drusus II", 14 BC–AD 23), son of Roman emperor Tiberius
- Drusus Caesar (Drusus Julius Caesar) ("Drusus III", AD 8–33), son of Germanicus, adoptive grandson of Tiberius
- Claudius, born Tiberius Claudius Drusus (10 BC–AD 54), Roman emperor from 41 to 54
- Claudius Drusus (Tiberius Claudius Drusus, circa AD 10–20), son of emperor Claudius

== See also ==
- Livii Drusi
