= Livia Drusa =

Livia Drusa is a name referring to women of the Drusi branch of the Livia gens of ancient Rome, the name Drusa is a feminized form of the cognomen Drusus. It may refer to:

- Livia, wife of Publius Rutilius Rufus
- Livia, mother of Servilia and Cato the Younger
- Livia (died 29 AD), wife of Augustus, better known by the diminutive Livia Drusilla

== See also ==
- Drizella, a Disney character
- Livia Drusilla (character of Rome), a character from the TV series Rome
