= Caepio =

Caepio may refer to:

- Quintus Servilius Caepio (adoptive father of Brutus)
- Quintus Servilius Caepio (consul 140 BC)
- Quintus Servilius Caepio (consul 106 BC)
- Quintus Servilius Caepio (quaestor 103 BC)
- Gnaeus Servilius Caepio (died c. 66 BC), brother of Cato the Younger
- Fannius Caepio, executed in 22 BC for conspiring against Augustus
- Caepio Crispinus, accused Granius Marcellus of extortion in 15 AD
