= Quintus Servilius Caepio =

Quintus Servilius Caepio may refer to:

- Quintus Servilius Caepio (consul 140 BC)
- Quintus Servilius Caepio (consul 106 BC)
- Quintus Servilius Caepio (quaestor 103 BC)
- Quintus Servilius Caepio (adoptive father of Brutus)
- Quintus Servilius Caepio Brutus, another name of Marcus Junius Brutus, the assassin of Julius Caesar
