= Haltern cooking pot =

Roman earthenware vessel

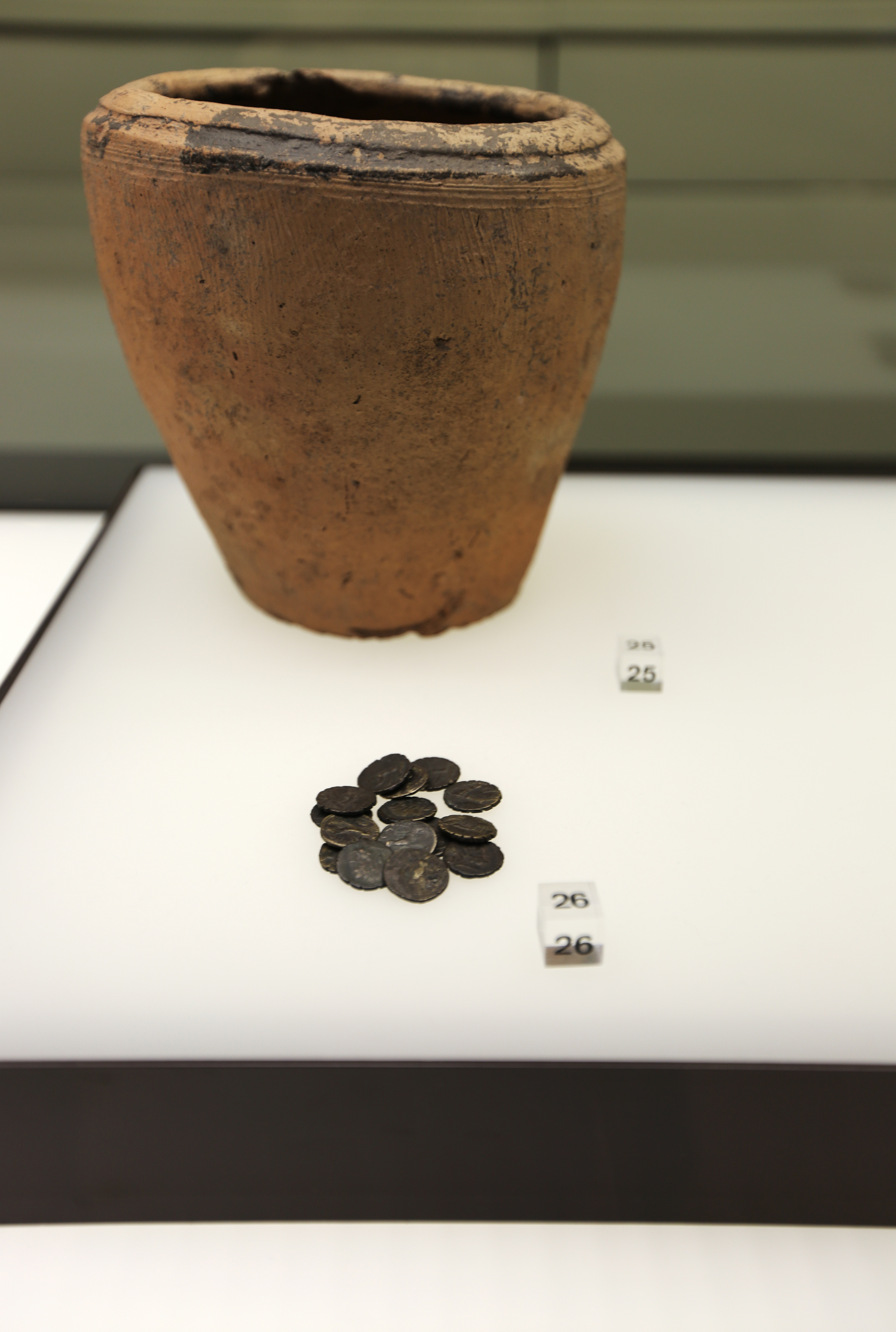
Exhibit in the Roman-Germanic Museum, Cologne

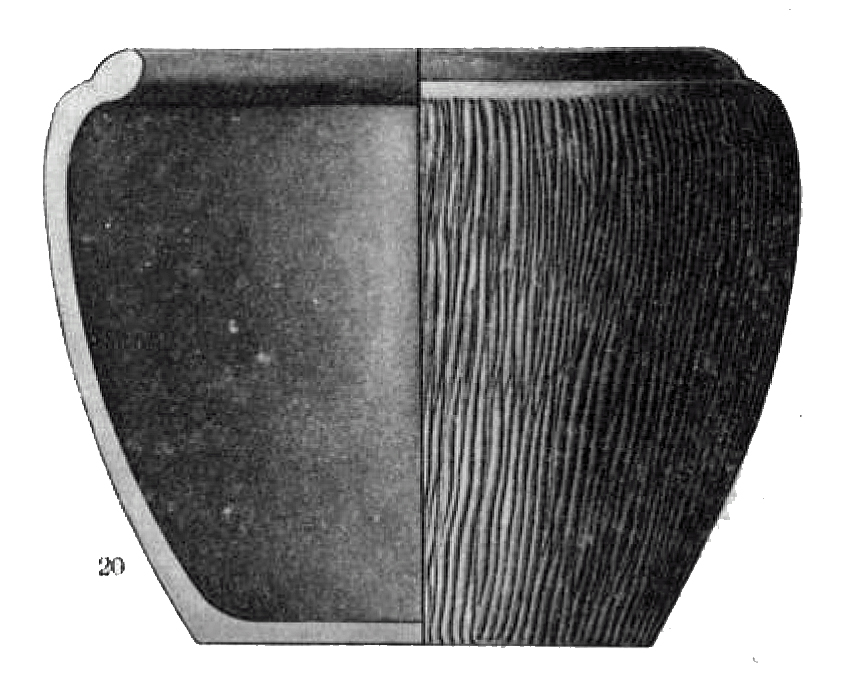
Drawing of a typical Haltern cooking pot (Haltern 91 A) based on Ritterling 1901

The Haltern cooking pot is an earthenware vessel from the Roman period. Due to its frequent occurrence as utility pottery in eastern Gallic and Rhinelandic settlements and military sites of the 1st century AD, it serves as a type fossil in provincial Roman archaeology for dating archaeological finds. In ceramic typology, the form is referred to as Haltern 91 after its eponymous site, the Haltern Roman camp.

== Form ==
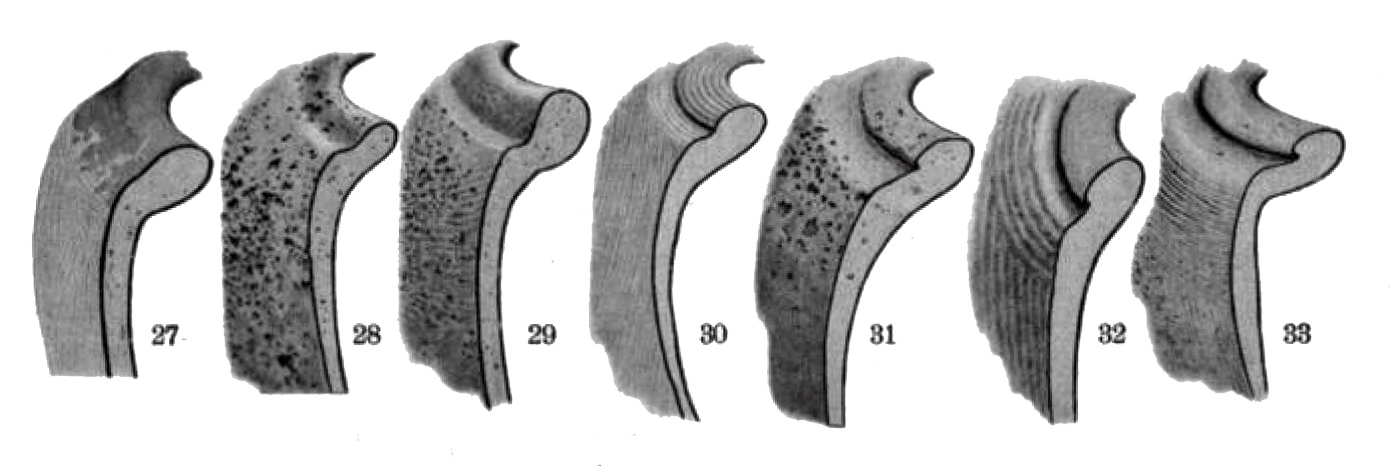
Rim types of the Haltern cooking pot (Haltern 91) based on Ritterling 1901

The Haltern cooking pot is a bulbous vessel whose widest diameter is at the shoulder. It is characterized by an inwardly curved, grooved rim with a sharp shoulder angle. It tapers steeply toward the base, with the narrowest part located at the flat base. Early vessels were handmade, but during the Tiberian era, they were replaced by wheel-thrown pots, maintaining the same shape.

The vessel surface is often coated with a clay slip, roughened with straw or twigs before firing to improve grip. The sherd is clay-based with sand tempering. Depending on the production site, it is black, light-colored, or reddish.

Two variants are distinguished in current literature. Haltern 91 A consists of poorly levigated clay, with reddish-brown to black sherds and a cork-like texture ("cork ware"). In contrast, Haltern 91 B is made from denser-firing clays. The exterior of Haltern 91 B is usually smooth, unlike the roughened surface of 91 A.

The type was first described in 1901 by Emil Ritterling based on finds from Haltern am See.

== Origin, Distribution, and Dating ==
The form derives from late La Tène eastern Gallic cooking pots and appears from the last decade of the 1st century BC in the Rhine-Moselle region, initially associated with Roman military sites. Its primary distribution area lies between Cologne, Nijmegen, and Mainz.

The La Tène version of this vessel type is usually handmade and lacks the characteristic Roman shoulder angle. Its surface is also often smooth rather than roughened. Roman troops stationed in Augustan eastern Gaul adopted this vessel type from the local population and introduced it to military sites along the Rhine and Lippe during the Drusus campaigns. Shortly after, Roman potters improved its production with advanced techniques. Handmade forms, however, persisted in the archaeological record until at least the second decade AD. These show the roughened surface and the characteristic shoulder angle.

Haltern cooking pots were widely used throughout the 1st century by Roman soldiers and in civilian settlements in Germania Inferior and adjacent regions. By the Flavian period, they gradually disappeared from the archaeological record.

A fine chronology within the type group has not been established. Variations in key features, such as the rim profile, seem to lack chronological significance.

== Usage ==
In addition to their use as cooking pots, Haltern pots were also employed as containers for food storage and transport. Some finds with pitched rims indicate that perishable goods were sealed in these vessels, covered with parchment, leather, or similar materials. The seal was made airtight with pitch and secured with a cord guided by the grooved shoulder rim. A vessel found at the Kops Plateau in Nijmegen contained the remains of 30 song thrushes, likely originating from the southern Ardennes. This storage vessel is typologically similar to the Haltern cooking pot but differs in rim design from the classic Haltern 91.

== Literature ==
- Hans Dragendorff: Excavations at Haltern. Finds from the Camp and Riverside Fort 1901–1902. In: Reports of the Antiquities Commission of Westphalia. 3, 1903, p. 85 ff. (supplementing Ritterling 1901).
- Ursula Heimberg: Colonia Ulpia Traiana. The earliest ceramics from the forum excavation. In: Bonner Jahrbücher. Vol. 187, 1987, pp. 411–474.
- Dieter Hupka: Roman settlement finds, industrial remains, and road findings in Mönchengladbach-Mülfort. Dissertation, University of Cologne, 2015, pp. 69 ff.
- Edeltraud Mittag: ''Studies on so-called Haltern cooking pots from the area of Colonia Ulpia Traiana (Xanten).'' In: Xantener Berichte, Vol. 8, Rheinland-Verlag, Cologne 1999, pp. 201–311.
- Mercedes Vegas: ''The Augustan utility pottery from Neuss'' (= ''Novaesium VI'', = ''Limesforschungen'' Vol. 14). Berlin 1975, pp. 38 ff.
- Emil Ritterling: ''The Roman settlement at Haltern. The finds.'' In: ''Reports of the Antiquities Commission of Westphalia.'' 2, 1901, pp. 160–162, Plate XXXVIII 20 and Plate XXXVI 27 ff.
