= Marcus Aemilius Paullus (consul in 302 BC) =

Marcus Aemilius Paullus was a politician of the Roman Republic during the 4th century BC. He served as consul in 302 BC.

== Family ==
He was a member of gens Aemilia, an ancient patrician gens descended from Numa Pompilius, second King of Rome. Marcus Aemilius Paullus, consul in 255 BC, was his son, thus making the Roman hero Lucius Aemilius Paullus Macedonicus his great-grandson.

== Career ==
He served as one of the consuls of 302 BC, with Marcus Livius Denter as his colleague. In that year, the war with the Aequi was renewed, although the consuls did not take part in it. Gaius Junius Bubulcus Brutus was appointed dictator to deal with this threat. In the same year, Aemilius Paullus personally led the army that defeated the Spartan prince Cleonymus, who had landed in Italy, resulting in the destruction of four-fifths of his ships at Patavium.

The following year, Aemilius Paullus was appointed Magister equitum under the dictator Marcus Valerius Corvus. Having defeated the Marsi tribe, the dictator went to Rome for repeated auspices regarding the war with the Etruscans. While he was away, Aemilius Paullus, leaving camp in search of provisions, was taken by surprise, defeated by the Etruscans and driven back to camp.
