= Hortensia (orator) =

1st century BC female Roman orator

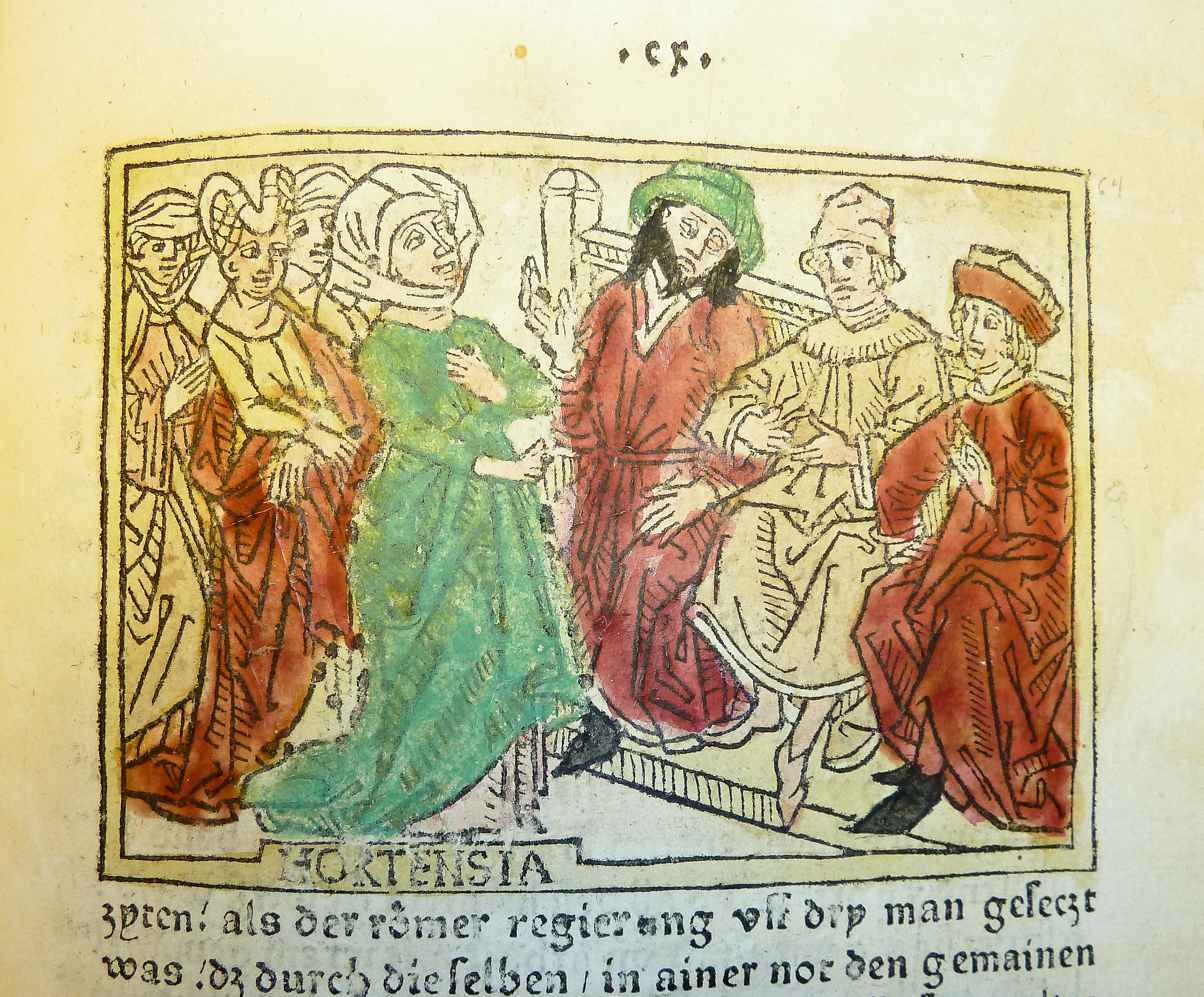
- Hortensia making her case to the Roman authorities on a colored woodcut from the 15th-century German translation of Giovanni Boccaccio's Concerning Famous Women
- Spouse: Quintus Servilius Caepio
- Parent: Quintus Hortensius Hortalus

Hortensia (fl. 42 BC), daughter of consul and advocate Quintus Hortensius, earned renown during the late Roman Republic as a skilled orator. She is best known for giving a speech in front of the members of the Second Triumvirate in 42 BC that resulted in the partial repeal of a tax on wealthy Roman women.

== Life ==
Little is known about the life of Hortensia aside from her career as an orator. She was the daughter of Quintus Hortensius apparently by his first wife Lutatia. Her father was well known among Romans due to his moving sermons on history and law and from his rivalry with his fellow orator Marcus Tullius Cicero. As a member of the aristocracy, Hortensia grew up in a wealthy household, and thus had access to Greek and Latin literature from a young age. She later concentrated on the study of rhetoric by reading speeches by the likes of her father and prominent Greek orators.

Hortensia is also believed to have been married to her second cousin Quintus Servilius Caepio, son of Quintus Servilius Caepio the Younger.

== Speech before the Second Triumvirate ==
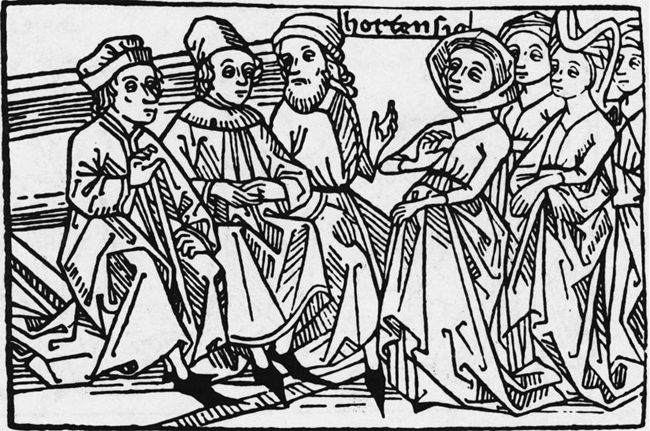
The angry matrons, led by Hortensia, address the triumvirs.

In 42 BC, nearly all of Rome's state-sponsored military legions, which were under the command of triumvirs Gaius Julius Caesar Octavianus, Marcus Aemilius Lepidus, and Marcus Antonius, were at war with the assassins of Julius Caesar (Decimus Junius Brutus Albinus, Marcus Junius Brutus and Gaius Cassius Longinus). To fund the ongoing war, the triumvirs had resorted to selling the property of wealthy citizens killed by proscription; however, this source of revenue did not prove to be lucrative enough, and the three men voted to place a tax on Rome's 1,400 most wealthy women. The women, outraged at having been taxed for a war they had no control over, chose Hortensia to articulate their concerns to the triumvirs. (In wartime women were allowed to break tradition and engage in public speaking). Along with a large group of interested citizens, the women marched to the Roman Forum, where Hortensia delivered her famous speech. The second-century Greek historian Appian documented Hortensia's speech. Though the words are not exactly hers, Appian's translation carries the themes of Hortensia:

"You have already deprived us of our fathers, our sons, our husbands, and our brothers, whom you accused of having wronged you; if you take away our property also, you reduce us to a condition unbecoming our birth, our manners, our sex. Why should we pay taxes when we have no part in the honours, the commands, the state-craft, for which you contend against each other with such harmful results? 'Because this is a time of war,' do you say? When have there not been wars, and when have taxes ever been imposed on women, who are exempted by their sex among all mankind?"

Hortensia also questioned the double standard of taxing women but excluding them from public office. Appian quoted Hortensia, stating, "Why should we pay taxes when we do not share in the offices, honours, military commands, nor, in short, the government for which you fight between yourselves with such harmful results?"

=== Impact of the speech ===
Outraged at having had their authority challenged by a group of women, Octavian, Antony, and Lepidus tried unsuccessfully to dismiss the women from the rostra. The next day, the three men reduced the number of women subject to the tax to 400, and instead, compensated for the loss of revenue by forcing male property-owners to lend money to the state and contribute to war expenses.

=== Praise ===
Hortensia's speech was later praised by contemporaries as the embodiment of the nuanced oratory technique for which her father had been known. Of this, Valerius Maximus wrote:

"For by bringing back her father's eloquence, she brought about the remission of the greater part of the tax. Quintus Hortensius lived again in the female line and breathed through his daughter's words."

== In popular culture ==
Hortensia is the main character and subject of the 2016 novel Rivals of the Republic by Annelise Freisenbruch.
