= Gaius Livius Drusus (consul) =

Roman consul in 147 BC

Gaius Livius Drusus was a Roman politician who was consul in 147 BC.

== Political career ==
Nothing is known of Livius' political career prior to his consulship. Under the provisions of the lex Villia annalis he must have served his praetorship before 150 BC. He served as consul for 147 BC, alongside Scipio Aemilianus, who was possibly his first cousin. During the Third Punic War and a popular demand for Aemilianus to take command in Africa, Livius may have requested that the command against the Carthaginians be distributed between the consuls by lot. This was vetoed by one of the plebeian tribunes, who proposed that the assignment of the provinces be put before the plebeian council. The people then voted to assign the war against Carthage to Aemilianus. The dispute however may have been mere theatre, since the election of Livius – a close relation of Scipio Aemilianus – would have ensured a friendly audience for the transfer of the command.

== Family ==
Livius' father was Marcus Livius Aemilianus, the biological son of the Lucius Aemilius Paullus who was consul in 219 and 216 BC and adoptive son of the Marcus Livius Salinator who was consul in 219 and 207 as well as censor in 204 BC. His father, a patrician, was adopted into a plebeian clan around 200 BC in the first known instance of an adoptive transitio ad plebem.

This Livius was the father of Gaius Livius Drusus, Marcus Livius Drusus (consul in 112 and censor in 109 BC) and Livia. Through the consul of 112 BC, this Livius is the grandfather of Marcus Livius Drusus, the reformist plebeian tribune in 91, and Mamercus Aemilius Lepidus Livianus, adopted back into the Aemilii, who served as consul in 77 BC.

== Bibliography ==
=== Modern ===
- Broughton, Thomas Robert Shannon (1951). The magistrates of the Roman republic. Vol. 1. New York: American Philological Association.
- Münzer, Fredrich (1926). "Livius 14" . Realencyclopädie der classischen Altertumswissenschaft (in German). Vol. XIII, 1. Stuttgart: Butcher. col. 855 – via Wikisource.
- Zmeskal, Klaus (2009). Adfinitas (in German). Vol. 1. Passau: Verlag Karl Stutz. ISBN 978-3-88849-304-1.

=== Ancient ===
- Appian, Roman History, Book 8
- Cicero, Tusculanae Disputationes

Political offices
Preceded by Spurius Postumius Albinus Magnus and Lucius Calpurnius Piso Caesoninus	Consul of the Roman Republic with Scipio Aemilianus; 147 BC	Succeeded by Gnaeus Cornelius Lentulus and Lucius Mummius Achaicus
