= Disability in ancient Rome =

Ancient Romans with disabilities were recorded in the personal, medical, and legal writing of the period. While some disabled people were sought as slaves, others with disabilities that are now recognized by modern medicine were not considered disabled. Some disabilities were deemed more acceptable than others; while some were viewed as honorable characteristics or traits that increased morality, others, especially congenital conditions, resulted in infanticide. Rendering someone disabled was also used as a punishment. Some mobility aids, such as early prosthetics, have been documented. Small, scattered medical references contain the only direct acknowledgments of disability.

== Medical opinion ==
In ancient Rome an imbalance of the four humors would be used to diagnose or understand physical and mental illnesses.

Soranus of Ephesus (a Methodic doctor who worked in Rome) wrote in his extant treatise on gynaecology that only certain children were worth raising, listing the various tests one could perform on a child to identify disabilities which might render them not worthy in his opinion. The treatise also states that the physical and mental fitness of a midwife or wet nurse also needed to be assessed by parents.

The later Roman physician Galen also discussed people with disabilities in his works on anatomy, claiming that both physical and mental impairments resulted from physical imbalances of the four humors. As such, he held to the traditional triad of melancholy, mania, and phrenitis as the three categories of mental disorder.

Romans separated disabilities by their functional consequences, and some disabled people were considered more capable than others. Wealth and class also determined the impact a disability had on a Roman citizen's daily life.

Roman doctors had a variety of terms to describe different degrees of optical impairment. Aulus Cornelius Celsus, in his treatise On Medicine (De Medicina), devoted a chapter to the subject of common eye infections, disease, problems, and their cures.

For women, medical approaches to mental illnesses were considered separate and uniquely different than men's.

== Roman laws on disability ==
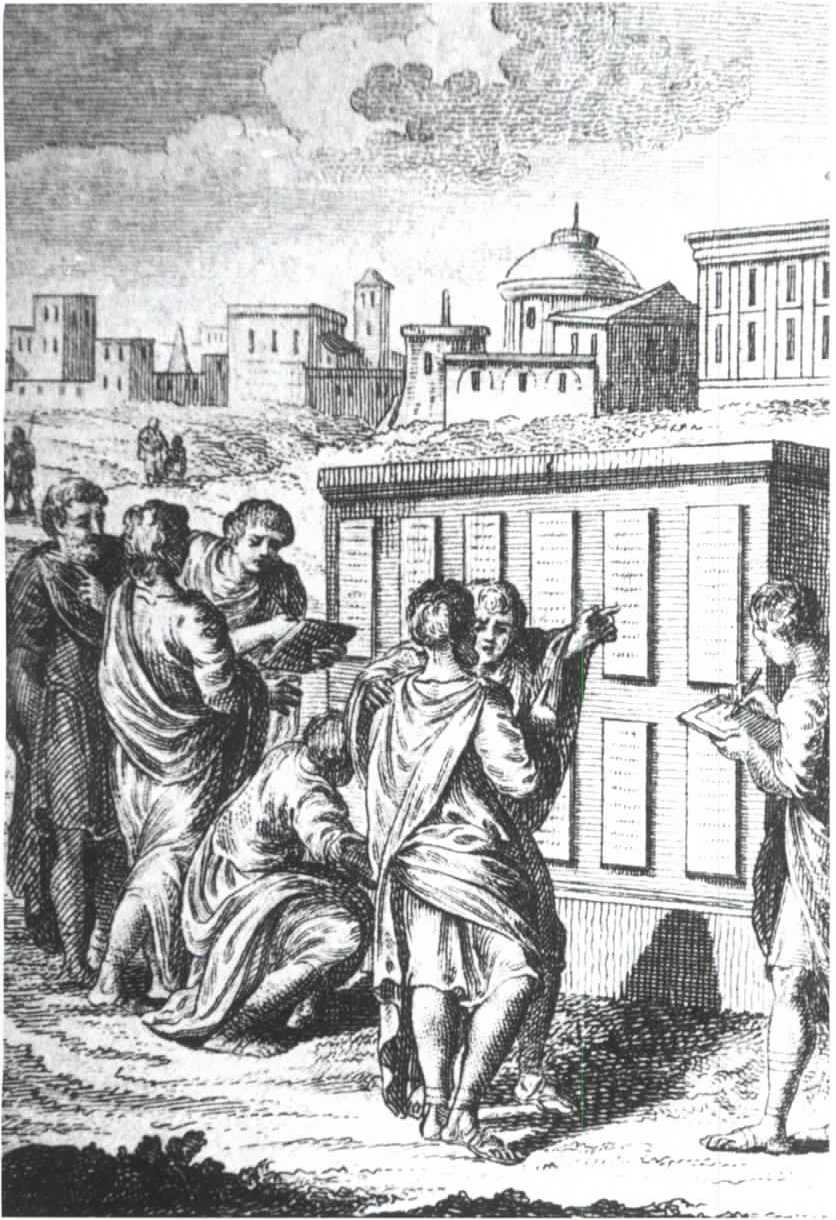
The Twelve Tables included laws that also accommodated disabled people in Rome.

The Twelve Tables included a law that said disabled children should be put to death, usually by stoning. They also stipulated that if a free person or an enslaved person is injured by another individual and becomes disabled, the injurer has to pay a certain amount of money or is punished by being impaired in a similar fashion.

In addition, Dionysius of Halicarnassus wrote that the city's founder Romulus required children who were born disabled to be exposed on a hillside. Some historians believe this was a fairly common practice, though the evidence for this is limited. As time passed however, enforcement of the law mentioned by Dionysius of Halicarcassus likely became less and less common until eventually in the third century, it was reversed by a new law requiring parents to take care of infants who were disabled.

It is also stated that those with physical disabilities like deafness would be given an advocate to represent them in court if it was required. Roman society valued the act of communication and private interaction, and the law did its best to accommodate those with physical disabilities affecting sight, hearing and speech. The Romans shared an indifference to those with mobility impairments and disabilities affecting their ability to travel. Problems arose with the many legalities in ancient Rome that required face-to-face, physical and private meetings not allowing the substitution of an enslaved person or representative.

In Commentarii de Bello Gallico, Julius Caesar mentions that the Gauls commonly impaired his centurions, usually by blinding them, mentioning that four centurions out of a cohort were blinded. Soldiers disabled in such circumstances were given a stipend by the state once they retired.

In Roman law blind people experienced the least number of troubles, as there was a higher cultural value placed on speech rather than sight, but many blind people were still not given any extraordinary legal consideration. Blind people in Rome were seen as capable to provide and care for themselves as any other Roman citizen. One of the few exceptions was will writing, as without the ability to see, multiple witnesses had to be present. Unlike the deaf or those deemed mentally impaired, blind citizens had the option to represent and speak for themselves in court but were unable to speak for or represent anyone else.

Deaf and nonverbal people experienced some difficulty with Roman law when it came to transactions like buying and selling. Most Roman agreements relied on verbal affirmation for a transaction to be considered complete, which could disadvantage deaf and/or nonverbal citizens.

There were chances and times when disabled Roman citizens took higher positions of power within systems like the Senate or other leadership roles, but they had a harder time gaining respect from their peers and those under them.

Emperors such as Nero or Caligula, are said to have used disfigurement or disablement as punishments for legal infractions, as well as personal attacks.

== In Roman culture ==
Blindness or partial blindness was highly regarded in the Roman psyche. Many individuals became famous after losing an eye. Notably, enslaved people would sometimes enter gladiatorial matches with a patch over a functioning eye, though historians disagree on whether this was in reference to the mythical cyclops or to make the gladiator appear more experienced. It is also known that many mythological figures, as well as known historical individuals, were thought by the Romans to have been blinded in return for favors from their gods. Such gifts varied from foresight to talent in singing. The language of the day also made note of those who were fully blind, caecus, and those who were partially sighted, luscus. Some blind children became beggars.

Physical disabilities affecting sight, hearing and speech made daily life difficult for the Roman citizen, as in Roman culture the act of communication and private interaction was of high importance.

Disabilities from injuries received while in the military were seen as marks of honor, with injuries to the eyes appearing most frequently in both common soldiers and famous personalities such as Hannibal. Many Roman writers, such as Seneca the Younger, would write about the physical impairments of prominent Roman civilians who had not received them in war and whom they wished to lampoon. Roman leaders typically had themselves depicted as physically perfect in statues and coinage. Pliny describes a wealthy but disabled man as being worthy of pity.

During the Augustan period of Rome, Augustus used enslaved people with disabilities as entertainment and display pieces that he invited the public to view. Though Augustus provided the people a way to view the unique and varying impairments as it interested himself, it was Suetonius that made sure others were aware that he still thought lowly of them.

Enslaved people with disabilities were so popular that Plutarch writes about the different kinds of impairments on display at the so-called Monster Markets. It was recorded that many Roman women kept people with curved spines as pets. People with curved spines appeared in the court of Caligula and were popular as displays during symposiums. They were held in a separate area of slave markets, as Plutarch called them, τεράτων ἀγορὰν, or the "market of monsters". These markets were so popular that the demand for enslaved people with disabilities lead to cages (glottokomae) that were used to stunt a person's growth. People were deliberately impaired, and people were willing to pay more or extra for the enslaved people with disabilities.

Individuals with curved spines were fairly common in public life, and in fact in some places were considered to be a source of luck for others. Further, they were occasionally known to rise to stations of eminent advisors, such as Nero's advisor Vatinius.

That the god Vulcan had a congenital disability yet worked as a smith has led many historians to believe that disabled Romans similarly specialized to accommodate their injuries but were not outcast.

== Attitudes towards disabled people ==
Historians who study the conditions of the ancient world imagine that nearly everyone in society had some form of injury, impairment, or disability. Moreover, Roman law did its best to accommodate specific impairments, which would have normalized what is considered a disability today.

Depending on one's status, impairments would have more or less impact on their daily life. For example, impairments affecting mobility among the elite were less of a problem, since their servants and enslaved people were tasked to carry them around. Whereas, among the lower- and middle-class citizens, mobility impairments might impede their job prospects.

Yet, disabilities and impairments could be seen in a negative light in certain situations. For example, people with severe disabilities or impairments were occasionally included in spectacles. In these contexts, it was acceptable to humiliate them and insult their appearance, such as addressing those who have lost an eye as cyclops. Moreover, when someone wanted to attack or demean an opponent, they could interpret their disability as a sign of their moral failings or a sign of God's punishment or disfavor. Metellus, an ancient Roman priest, was excluded from the priesthood on account of his blindness. It was believed that his blindness indicated that the gods were angry with him.

Seneca says: "...we destroy monstrous births, and we also drown our children if they are born weakly or unnaturally formed".

== Disabilities as moral descriptors ==
In ancient literary texts, disabilities were used as defining traits to a character or significant Roman figure. The language used to describe a disability highlighted either their ugly or unique looks and character.

Nero and Augustus shared similar impairment in the spotted discoloration of the skin or corpora maculosa (spotted bodies), of the two only Nero's were considered foul. Augustus's were described as "scattered about his breast and belly in form, order, and number as the stars of the Great Bear in the heavens".

== Romans with disabilities ==
In regard to historical documentation of disabilities in the ancient world, there are few records that provide in-depth details about disabilities.

- Roman dictator Julius Caesar experienced seizures.
- The Roman censor Appius Claudius Crassus received the nickname "Caecus" due to his blindness.
- Gaius Livius Drusus went blind young but became a successful jurist.
- Gaius Gemellus Horigenes (born c. 171 AD, referring to himself as a Roman citizen in 214 AD) is the most well documented individual of the ancient world. The findings of his family's archive gave detailed information about his community and life; he lost one eye and developed a cataract in the other. Gaius's physical disability was considered less of a limitation by the Romans.

The next few Notable Romans also had some form of physical and/or mental disabilities, some are backed by supportive evidence and others are speculation based on others accounts.

- Quintus Pedius was a deaf painter who is mentioned in Pliny's Natural History.
- Senator Gnaeus Domitius Tullus (84 AD) in his old age and experiencing illness he became disabled and required assistance to care for himself. Pliny the Younger depicted him as pitiful and living ignorant to the indignity he put himself through.
- Marcus Sergius (218–201 BC) lost his hand during the second Punic war and is known for being the first to use a prosthesis, replacing his hand with one made of iron and continuing to fight.
- Spurius Carvilius was embarrassed to leave his home because of his disability, even with encouragement from his mother to see his situation as a symbol of valor for being a war veteran.
- Justin II (520–578, ruled Eastern Roman Empire 565–578) was driven mad in his last five years according to John of Ephesus, and spent them locked in the palace on a wheeled throne which was moved by attendants whom he frequently tried to bite. His men would push the chair around the palace at great speed and play organ music among other things in attempts to distract and calm him down.
- Claudius I (10 BC – 54 AD, ruled 41–54) was depicted as having speech and physical disorders by Seneca the Younger but it is uncertain whether this was political satire or fact.
