= Quintus Poppaedius Silo =

Leader of the Italian Marsi (died 88 BC)

Quintus Poppaedius Silo (sometimes seen as Pompaedius) (died 88 BC) was a leader of the Italian tribe of the Marsi and one of the leaders of the Italian rebels during the Social War against Rome. Poppaedius was called the 'heart and soul' of the rebellion. He was a friend of Marcus Livius Drusus the Younger.

A story told by Plutarch tells of Silo making a visit to Drusus and meeting the children of the house. In a playful mood he asked the children's support for his cause. All of them nodded and smiled except Cato the Younger, who stared at the guest with most suspicious looks. Silo demanded an answer from him and seeing no response took Cato and hung him by the feet out of the window. Even then, Cato would not say anything.

In 91 BC, Poppaedius led 10,000 Marsi in a march on Rome to support Drusus' pro-Italian legislation. They were met by Gnaeus Domitius Ahenobarbus, the Pontifex Maximus, who persuaded them to go back.

After Drusus's assassination, the Social War began and Silo became the military leader of the Marsi. At the start of the war, twelve Italian tribes formed Italia, their own state in Italy (as an alternative to the Roman Republic), and Silo was elected one of two Italian consuls. As 'consul' Silo was given command of the Marsic group (Marsi, Paeligni, Vestini, Marrucini, Picentes, Frentani), whereas his consular colleague Gaius Papius Mutilus was given command of the Samnite group. During the second year of the war (90 BC) he tricked and ambushed Quintus Servilius Caepio, a Roman praetor, and slaughtered his army.

The opposing general, Q. Poppaedius [Silo] deserted to Caepio (though this was only pretence). As a pledge he brought with him his own sons (or so he pretended. They were in fact slave babies dressed with the purple-bordered garments of free-born children.) As further confirmation of his good faith he brought masses of gold and silver (which were actually lead, plated with precious metal). Poppaedius pointed out that with his 'defection' his own army was currently leaderless. If Caepio made haste he could capture the entire force. Completely deceived, Caepio followed to where Poppaedius said the army would be. This army was in fact hidden in ambush, and when Poppaedius ran up a hill as though to look for his men, this was the signal for them to spring from concealment. Caepio was cut to pieces, and so were his men.

Poppaedius is said to have killed Caepio himself, as Poppaedius held Caepio responsible for the assassination of Drusus. He then went after Caepio's co-commander Gaius Marius, Rome's most experienced general, but was unable to force a decisive engagement. This led Poppaedius to challenge Marius: 'So if you are such a great general, Marius, why not come down [from your fortifications] and fight it out?' To this Marius retorted 'Well, if you think you are any good a general, why don't you try to make me?'

During 89 BC the fortunes of war turned against the Italian rebels. Poppaedius, now fighting in Samnium, recaptured the Samnite capital Bovianum which had been taken by Lucius Cornelius Sulla. After Bovianum he tried to eject the Romans from Apulia but he was killed in battle by Drusus's brother, Mamercus Aemilius Lepidus Livianus.

== Fiction ==
Silo appears as a supporting character in the first two novels of Colleen McCullough's Masters of Rome series; The First Man in Rome and The Grass Crown.
