= Gaius Gemellus Horigenes =

- Born: 171; Karanis, Roman Egypt
- Died: After 214

Gaius Gemellus Horigenes, also known as Gemellus Horion, (171 CE, Karanis (Kom Aushim), Roman Egypt- after 214 CE) was a man best known in the historical record to be “one of the ancient world's most well-documented and contextualized disabled individuals”. Gaius Gemellus Horigenes is one of the few documented historical individuals to have a visual impairment, as he was missing one eye, and later developed cataracts in his other eye.

In numerous papyri found in an excavation at Kom Aushim led by the University of Michigan in 1924, the personal family archive of Gemellus Horigenes was recovered in 28 different texts, ranging from AD 93 to 214. After being assembled and transcribed, the excavated texts showed the different properties amassed by the family over three generations at the villages of Karanis, Psenarpsenesis, Kerkesoucha, and Bakchias, as well as several legal petitions submitted by Gemellus Horigenes to the Roman imperial administration of the province of Egypt, in light of the restrictions caused by his eye disability. In his claims, Gaius Gemellus Horigenes states having suffered a negative treatment and numerous hostilities from his neighbors, who would have trespassed his property, damaged his crops, violently attacked him and his mother, and even cast spells against him.

In all his petitions, Gemellus Horigenes repeats that he was targeted because of his disability, and that his condition made him vulnerable to these offenses. However, some historians have proposed that Gaius' physical disability was not considered a limitation by the Romans. His family's archive showed a prosperous family property of various houses and courtyards, and it suggests that most of his members were not only functionally literate, but also highly educated and possibly benefited by a Roman citizenship status inherited from their grandfather, Julius Niger. The detailed findings on Gaius Gemellus Horion's life and his family circumstances provide a written record of daily life and community experience in ancient Roman Egypt, and specifically on the social conditions tied to disability in antiquity.

== Life ==
He was born to Gaius Apollinarius Niger and Tasoucharion, their fathers, and was the grandson of Gaius Julius Niger, an Antinoopolite of the Osirantis tribe and a discharged cavalryman of the ala veterana Gallica, a status which had brought him Roman citizenship.

Although Gaius Gemellus Horigenes’ date of birth was estimated around 171 AD, his first account in the papyri archives dates from 197 AD when he would have been a 26-year-old adult. Based on census returns from Roman Egypt establishing patterns on age, gender, marriage and mortality, male life expectancy would have spanned from 26 years to 37 years in that period. Given that Gemellus Horion would have already been middle-aged and very wealthy, he would have married and started a family at some point between his first and last appearance in the family archive in AD 214, following the historical patterns for Roman Egypt context. However, there is no indication that he married, which has made historians question if his disability could have influenced his marriage status.

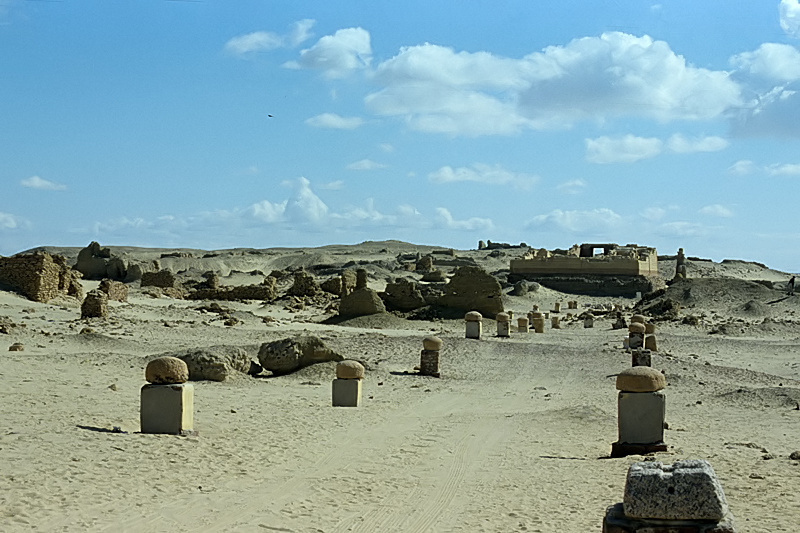
Karanis Archeological Site

Between February and May of 197 AD, Gemellus Horion states in a first petition addressed to the prefect of Egypt Quinto Aemilia Saturnine, that by that time he and his brother had already taken possession of the properties inherited from his father, and also the possessions from his uncle, Gaius Julius Longuinus, who had died eight years before, and have since actively produced from their lands. His possessions included at least four houses and seven courtyards, as well as interests in olive yards, garden lands, and grain lands in the villages of Karanis, Psenarpsenesis, Kerkesoucha, and Bakchias. For this, Gemellus Horion would have been considered of high social status and wealth among his community. Later in the papyri, he claimed his neighbors Julius and Sotas violently brought down his crops after the sowing, and blocked his way by putting obstacles around him, taking advantage of his disability.

A second petition, from May 22 of that same year, states harassment continued even after the death of Sotas, damaging Horion's crops and cutting from an olive grains possession he had at Kerkesoucha. Gemellus Horion then denounced he was inflected a magic spell utilizing a fetus, first against one of his employees to prevent them from harvesting his crops, and then against Horion himself and the officers he brought to solve the situation. Also, because of the damage and stealing his crops, he was unable to pay for his taxes and asked not to be made an exemption.

A third petition was made on August 26 against a tax collector named Kastor, who would have harassed Horion and his family, assaulting his mother and vandalizing his home. Since Horion had paid all his taxes, this would have been an unrelated abuse from the tax collector. With this petition Gemellus Horion not only specifies his disability as having one eye missing but also states the vulnerability he was subjected to because his disability affected his family rather than specifically himself.

In his fourth petition, dating from 199 AD, he asked the epistrategos (regional governor) Arrius Victor to review his participation in liturgy, a type of public service, as he states being exempt from it because of his visual disability. The penalties for wrongly ordering a liturgy in Roman Egypt were high, implying there would be a consensus on Gemellus Horion's condition among the community in Karanis. He also specified, at this moment, that his visual impairment is due to missing one eye and having a cataract appear in the other.

His last record on papyri documents dates from 214, also related to a tax exemption. He submits a declaration of all his inherited properties, which include a village and crop parcels, to Kopres, village secretary of Karanis, to transfer property liable to taxation from some of these main properties to his corn producing parcels. He also states he is afflicted with weak vision, even if his disability is not directly linked to his petition, which had some historians argue his condition may have been used to provoke empathy among Roman authorities.

== Visual impairment ==
Gaius Gemellus Horigenes provided a detailed physical description of his persona that is irregular for ancient individuals. He is stated to be impaired of one eye and having developed cataracts in the other. His disability is not stated as blindness, but rather as a visual illness or weakness of seeing, and as such, was only relevant to mention as part of legal petitions. His disability might not have been determinant of his social status, and he would have been judged with similar standards to other males in his context.

Twelve Tables Engraving

It is stated in his family archive that his grandfather, Gaius Julius Niger, would have inherited them roman citizenship because of his military service. However, Gaius Gemellus Horigenes does not state being a Roman Citizenship until 214 AD at his last written record, so it has not been possible for historians to confirm his exact legal and social condition during most of his life. Even though, in recent years historians have proposed his condition and social reputation could have been highly privileged. According to Kevin Clark Treadway, Horion's possibility for public demands such as those submitted in his petitions reflected an influential stand among the Karanis community, and a valued state of legitimacy in his word. His explicit intentions to advocate for the Roman official's empathy would demonstrate his visual imparity was shielded in Roman law with the Twelve Tables.

The word and capacity of speech was the primary factor valued in the Roman world regarding a citizen status, and as such the law had accommodated to Horion's disability even to submit his legal petitions, as he presumably dictated his claims to the individuals who did write them, and approved the final version of each before witnessing, signing, and submitting them. This was one of the alternatives given to fullfill his legal tasks within his physical impairment. The cause of the abuses and offenses directed particularly towards his disability, whether false or true, shows a contemptuous perception from his neighbors because of his condition, but one that does not extend to his legal status.
