= Marcus Livius Drusus Claudianus =

Father of Roman empress Livia

- Born: Appius Claudius Pulcher
- Died: 42 BC
- Cause of death: Suicide
- Known for: Father of empress Livia
- Spouse: Alfidia
- Children: Gaius Livius Drusus (possibly); Livia Prima (possibly); Livia Drusilla; Marcus Livius Drusus Libo (adopted)
- Parent(s): (Gaius?) Claudius Pulcher (possible biological father); Marcus Livius Drusus (adoptive father); Servilia (adoptive mother)
- Family: Claudii Pulchri; Livii Drusi (adoptive)

Marcus Livius Drusus Claudianus (born no later than 93 BC – died 42 BC) was a senator and praetor of the Roman Republic. He was born with the name Appius Claudius Pulcher, into the patrician family of the Claudii Pulchri but adopted by a Livius Drusus as a small child. His daughter Livia Drusilla became the wife of the first Roman Emperor Augustus, and he was a direct ancestor of the Julio-Claudian emperors Tiberius, Caligula, Claudius and Nero.

== Biography ==
=== Background ===
As a Pulcher, Claudianus was a direct descendant of the consul and censor Appius Claudius Caecus through his son Publius Claudius Pulcher. Claudianus descended via the first Appius Claudius Pulcher, who was consul in 212 BC and Publius Claudius Pulcher's son or grandson.

Antiquarian Bartolomeo Borghesi suggested that his biological father could have been either Appius Claudius Pulcher (military tribune in the year 87 BC) or the Gaius Claudius Pulcher (legate or praetor in 73 BC); both of these men were sons of Gaius Claudius Pulcher (consul in 130 BC). Appius Claudius Pulcher (consul of 79 BC); and Gaius Claudius Pulcher (the consul of 92 BC), have been postulated by Ronald Syme. (Note: The praenomen Gaius on Claudianus supposed son could suggest that Claudianus father was indeed a Gaius.) Susan Treggiari has speculated that his mother might have been a sister of Marcus Livius Drusus the tribune, this explaining his adoption by Drusus, since Drusus had at least two other nephews whom he chose Claudianus over. (Note: Friedrich Münzer has argued that this may have been due to the boys (Caepio and Cato) being each father's only son. But this has been disputed, it is likely his nephew Gnaeus Caepio had an older half-brother.) Adopted fathers and sons were often closely related and adoption of a sororal nephew was especially common in Rome.

=== Early life ===
Little is known about the circumstances leading to Claudianus's adoption by Marcus Livius Drusus. He was unusually young at the time of adoption (likely a small child, if not an infant), (Note: This has led to some speculation that Claudianus adopted father might have actually been Drusus brother Mamercus Aemilius Lepidus Livianus (who himself was adopted into another family), but this is a minority opinion.) as most other adoption in ancient Rome happened with the adoptee as adults. In accordance with convention, his name was changed from Appius Claudius Pulcher to Marcus Livius Drusus Claudianus, in honour of his adoptive father. Drusus may have been married to a Servilia at the time, who would have been Claudianus adoptive mother. Since the death of his adopted father's sister Livia Drusa, he was likely raised together with her children Servilia Major, Gnaeus Servilius Caepio, Servilia Minor, Porcia and Cato in Drusus's household. Drusus was assassinated in 91 BC and Claudianus presumably inherited all his immense wealth.

=== Career ===
Claudianus was praetor of Rome in 50 BC and presided over a court case brought under the Lex Scantinia. Caelius, writing to Cicero, seems to find the situation ironic.

In 45 BC, Cicero had purchased gardens owned by Claudianus in Rome. Claudianus was a supporter of the Roman Republic and was among those who opposed the rule and dictatorship of Julius Caesar, assassinated in 44 BC by Brutus and Cassius.

In 42 BC, Claudianus arranged for his daughter Livia Drusilla to marry his kinsman Tiberius Claudius Nero, who became the parents of future Roman Emperor Tiberius and the general Nero Claudius Drusus. Through this second grandson, Claudianus was a direct ancestor to the Roman Emperors Caligula, Claudius, and Nero.

=== Death ===
Claudianus became a supporter of Brutus and Cassius and joined them in the war against Octavian and Mark Antony. The decision would have serious consequences for him and for Livia's family. He fought alongside Brutus and Cassius at the Battle of Philippi in 42 BC. When Brutus and Cassius were defeated, they committed suicide. Claudianus killed himself in his tent to avoid being captured alive by the victors.

== Family ==
Claudianus married a woman of plebeian status called Alfidia. They had at least one child: a daughter Livia Drusilla (59 BC–29 AD). The usage of the nickname "Drusilla" might imply that she had an older sister. Claudianus relatively advanced age at the time of his marriage to Alfidia could indicate that he had been married before.

It is also probable that he had a biological son named Gaius Livius Drusus who had two daughters named Livia Pulchra and Livia Livilla. This son may have died in battle after the assassination of Julius Caesar, or been proscribed and killed by the Second Triumvirate.

He also adopted as his son Marcus Livius Drusus Libo. This was likely a testamentary adoption. Adoptions of that sort was mostly carried out because a man lacked legitimate sons who could carry on their name and estate, perhaps implying that if Claudianus had ever had a son, he was likely dead before his father wrote his will. (Note: There is a possibility that Drusus Libo and Livia Drusilla were the only people left in Rome who bore the Drusi name after Claudianus death. This would explain why Livia felt it prudent to pass down the name to her own son Nero Claudius Drusus (a man inheriting a name from his mother was unusual in Rome during the Republic).)

== Legacy ==
The poet Sextus Propertius [11.1.27], described the Battle of Philippi as civilia busta or "sepulchre of citizens". The 1st-century senator and historian Aulus Cremutius Cordus, glorified Brutus and Cassius in his history and described those who fought alongside Caesar's assassins as the "last of the Romans".

When his grandson the future Roman emperor Tiberius celebrated his coming of age, Tiberius staged two gladiatorial contests. One was held at the Forum in memory of his father and the other held at the amphitheatre in memory of his grandfather Drusus Claudianus.

The emperor Claudius dedicated an inscription to honor his ancestor on the Greek island of Samos. This surviving inscription in Greek, hails Claudianus as the "origin of many great and good works for the world" or "megiston agathon aition…en toi kosmoi". Claudius also honoured Claudianus with statues in Rome.

== In fiction ==
Drusus Claudianus appears as a minor character in Colleen McCullough's Masters of Rome series (beginning with the second book, The Grass Crown). While the character's family relations and details of his life closely match, McCullough makes her character's biological father a Claudius Nero rather than a Claudius Pulcher.
