= Gaius Livius Drusus (jurist) =

- Father: Gaius Livius Drusus
- Family: Livii Drusi

Gaius Livius Drusus was a jurist mentioned by Cicero in his work Tusculanae Disputationes. He became a successful jurist despite going blind young, or possibly even being blind at birth.

== Biography ==
=== Early life ===
Drusus was a son of Gaius Livius Drusus, he had two known siblings, a brother named Marcus Livius Drusus and a sister named Livia.

=== Career ===
Despite being the eldest son Drusus never stood for election, likely due to his blindness.

Drusus composed works of great use to students of law, and was cited by subsequent writers on the law. Celsus cites an opinion of Livius Drusus concerning a seller's rights at law, stating that the seller might bring an equitable action for damages against the buyer, to recover the expenses of the upkeep of a slave, whom the buyer, without due cause, had refused to accept. Priscian attributes to Drusus the sentence "Impubes libripens esse non potest, neque antestari" ("Young boys cannot stand on their feet before they can learn to balance").

Although he was blind, Livius Drusus continued to give advice to the crowds which used to gather before his house in order to consult him. Cicero stated "Drusus's house was crowded with clients. When they, whose business it was, could not see how to conduct themselves, they applied to a blind guide".

== Family ==
Drusus is not known to have been married or had any children.

== See also ==
- List of blind people
- Disability in ancient Rome
