= Marcus Livius Denter =

Roman politician (died 295 BC)

Marcus Livius Denter (d. 295 BC) was a Roman politician who was consul, belonging to gens Livia in the fourth century BC.

In 302 BC, he was appointed as consul with Marcus Aemilius Paullus. During their consulship, the Spartan prince Cleonymus landed in southern Italy to attack the Lucani, and according to Titus Livius, was either defeated and driven out by Aemilius Paullus or he left before the arrival of the dictator Gaius Junius Bubulcus Brutus, who was sent to repel him.

After the decision of the Lex Ogulnia in 300 BC, plebeians were allowed to hold priestly offices, and Livius Denter was the first plebeian to be elected Pontiff. In this capacity, he is said to have died in 295 BC. During the decisive Battle of Sentinum, he was at the side of the consul Publius Decius Mus when he performed the Devotio, sacrificing himself in battle for victory.
