= Marcus Livius Drusus (consul) =

Roman senator

- Born: 155 BC
- Died: 108 BC (aged 46–47)
- Office: Tribune of the plebs (122 BC); Consul (112 BC); Censor (109 BC)
- Spouse: Cornelia
- Children: Marcus Livius Drusus; Mamercus Aemilius Lepidus Livianus; Livia
- Father: Gaius Livius Drusus

Marcus Livius Drusus (155–108 BC) was a Roman politician who served as consul in 112 BC. He was also governor of Macedonia and campaigned successfully in Thrace against the Scordisci.

== Early life ==
Drusus was a son of Gaius Livius Drusus. He had a brother named Gaius Livius Drusus and a sister named Livia.

== Tribunate ==
Drusus was set up as tribune of the plebs by the Senate in 122 BC to undermine Gaius Gracchus' land reform bills. To do this (according to the record of Appian), he proposed creating twelve colonies with 3,000 settlers each from the poorer classes, and relieving rent on property distributed since 133 BC. He also said the Latin allies should not be mistreated by Roman generals, which was the counteroffer to Gracchus' offer of full citizenship. These were known as the Leges Liviae, but they were never enacted, because the Senate simply wanted to draw support away from Gracchus.

Their plan was successful. Drusus had just enough popular support to justify his veto of Gracchus' bills.

== Consulship and later career ==
Drusus was later consul in 112 BC and fought in Macedonia defeating the Scordisci, even pushing them out of Thrace across the Danube.

In 109 BC he was elected censor along with the elder Marcus Aemilius Scaurus. He died in office.

== Family ==
Drusus was married to a Cornelia, they had three known children:

- Marcus Livius Drusus, the famous tribune of 91 BC, whose murder incited the Italian Social War.
- Mamercus Aemilius Lepidus Livianus, the consul of 77 BC (adopted into the Aemilii Lepidi), who married the daughter of Sulla the dictator.
- Livia, the mother of Servilia and Cato the Younger.

Brutus family tree

Salonia (2)	Cato the Elder	Licinia (1)
Marcus Porcius Cato Salonianus	Marcus Porcius Cato Licinianus	Marcus Livius Drusus
Marcus Porcius Cato (2)	Livia	Quintus Servilius Caepio (1)	Marcus Livius Drusus
Atilia (1)	Cato the Younger	Marcus Livius Drusus Claudianus, adopted son
Marcus Junius Brutus (1)	Servilia, mistress of Julius Caesar (see AUGUSTUS below)	Decimus Junius Silanus (2)	Servilia	Gnaeus Servilius Caepio	Lucius Appuleius SATURNINUS
Marcus Porcius Cato	Porcia	Marcus Junius Brutus†	Junia Prima	Junia Tertia	Gaius Cassius Longinus x	Marcus Aemilius Lepidus (consul 78 BC)	Appuleia, daughter of SATURNINUS
Junia Secunda	Marcus Aemilius Lepidus (triumvir)	Lucius Aemilius Paullus (consul 50 BC)
Descendant of POMPEY MAGNUS and Lucius Cornelius SULLA	son (perhaps Quintus Aemilius Lepdius?)	Marcus Aemilius Lepidus Minor (the Younger)	Servilia Isaurica, daughter of Junia Prima (see above) and Publius Servilius Isauricus	Emperor AUGUSTUS (possibly, see JULIO-CLAUDIANS for descendants)	Paullus Aemilius Lepidus	Cornelia, daughter of Gnaeus Cornelius Lentulus Marcellinus and Scribonia, wife of AUGUSTUS and mother of Julia the Elder
Manius Aemilius Lepidus	Aemilia Lepida II (also engaged to Lucius Caesar, see JULIO-CLAUDIANS and AUGUSTUS)	Publius Sulpicius Quirinius (of the Sulpicia gens, related to GALBA below)	Lucius Aemilius Paullus (consul 1)	Julia the Younger, daughter of Julia the Elder and Marcus Vispanius Agrippa, see AUGUSTUS and Cornelia above	Marcus Aemilius Lepidus (consul 6 AD)
daughter (perhaps known as Aemilia Lepida?)
Aemilia Lepida	Servius Sulpicius GALBA	Mamercus Aemilius Scaurus (of the Aemilia gens, related to the Lepidae)	Marcus Junius Silanus Torquatus (of the Junia gens, related to BRUTUS, see above)	Aemilia Lepida	CLAUDIUS (see AUGUSTUS above and JULIO-CLAUDIANS)	Lucius Vitellius (consul 34)	Livilla, daughter of Drusus the Elder and sister of Germanicus and CLAUDIUS, aunt of Drusus Caesar (see JULIO-CLAUDIANS and to the right)	Lucius Aelius Sejanus, the almost emperor	Aemilia Lepida	Drusus Caesar, son of Agrippina the Elder, daughter of Julia the Elder (see AUGUSTUS and Julia the Younger above and see JULIO-CLAUDIANS)
Gaius Cassius Longinus (descended from or related to GAIUS CASSIUS LONGINUS, see above)	Junia Lepida	Junia Calvina	Lucius Vitellius (consul 48)	Aulus VITELLIUS (for Otho's relation, in terms of the Year of the Four Emperors, he married Poppaea Sabina, who married NERO, see AUGUSTUS and CLAUDIUS above)
Cassia Longina	Gnaeus Domitius Corbulo, brother of Milona, wife of CALIGULA, see JULIO-CLAUDIANS and see above
Lucius Aelius Lamia Plautius Aelianus	Domitia Longina	Domitian, see FLAVIANS and VESPASIAN
Plautia (possibly existed, although unsure, but if so, then her brother is Lucius Fundanius Lamia Aelianus, father of Lucius Plautius Lamia Silvanus, alleged ancestor of Fabia Orestilla, wife of Gordian I, see GORDIANS)	Lucius Ceionius Commodus
Lucius Aelius Caesar	Marcus Aurelius (see NERVA-ANTONINES)
Lucius Verus (for further relations, see NERVA-ANTONINES)	Lucilla

(1): 1st spouse
(2): 2nd spouse
†: assassin of Caesar

Notes:

Political offices
Preceded by G. Caecilius Metellus Caprarius; Gn. Papirius Carbo	Roman consul 112 BC; With: Lucius Calpurnius Piso Caesoninus	Succeeded by P. Cornelius Scipio Nasica; L. Calpurnius Bestia
