= Mamercus Aemilius Lepidus Livianus =

Roman politician and general

- Spouse: Cornelia Sulla
- Children: Aemilia Lepida
- Parents: Marcus Livius Drusus (father); Cornelia (mother)

Mamercus Aemilius Lepidus Livianus (died c. 62 BC) was a Roman politician and military commander who was consul in 77 BC.

== Biography ==
Livianus was a well connected and influential figure in Late Republican politics. A member of the aristocratic party, brother of the tribune Marcus Livius Drusus and son of the consul Marcus Livius Drusus, he was adopted into the Aemilii Lepidi. His influence was such that he was able to intercede with Lucius Cornelius Sulla on the young Julius Caesar's behalf, getting Sulla to spare Caesar's life. He was also married to Cornelia, Sulla's daughter.

Around 91 BC Livianus succeeded his brother Marcus Livius Drusus as one of the pontifices in the College of Pontiffs. He served with distinction in the Social War (91–87 BC), probably serving as legate under Quintus Caecilius Metellus Pius. He achieved some victories, most notably he was credited with killing the general of the Marsi, Quintus Poppaedius Silo, during the storming of Venusia.

Although having failed once to be elected praetor, Livianus tried again, achieving the office by 81. He ran for the office of consul in 77, achieving it only after Gaius Scribonius Curio withdrew his candidature for that year in favor of Livianus. Neither Mamercus nor his consular colleague accepted a proconsular command in Hispania to help Quintus Caecilius Metellus Pius in the Sertorian War. There is no evidence that he obtained a provincial command after his term was concluded.

Following his term as consul Livianus was probably a promagistrate serving under Marcus Antonius Creticus in 74, who had been given an extraordinary commission to clear the Mediterranean Sea of pirates operating from Crete. By 70, he may have been Princeps Senatus, although the evidence is inconclusive. He was called as a hostile witness against Gaius Cornelius in 65, as part of the events surrounding the First Catilinarian Conspiracy.

== Family ==
Livianus had a daughter named Aemilia Lepida who was engaged to her cousin Cato for a time.

Livianus nephews and nieces Servilia, Servilia Minor, Gnaeus Servilius Caepio, Cato and Porcia may have lived with him after the death of their parents.

== Depictions in fiction ==
Lepidus Livianus appears in Colleen McCullough's novel The Grass Crown and its sequels.

== Sources ==
- T. Robert S. Broughton, The Magistrates of the Roman Republic, Vol II (1952).
- Anthon, Charles & Smith, William, A New Classical Dictionary of Greek and Roman Biography, Mythology and Geography (1860).
- Gruen, Erich S., The Last Generation of the Roman Republic (1995).

Political offices
Preceded by Marcus Aemilius Lepidus; Quintus Lutatius Catulus	Roman consul 77 BC; With: Decimus Junius Brutus	Succeeded by Gnaeus Octavius; Gaius Scribonius Curio
