= Quintus Servilius Caepio (quaestor 103 BC) =

Roman patrician, statesman and soldier (died 90 BC)

- Born: Ancient Rome
- Died: 90 BC
- Cause of death: killed in battle
- Citizenship: Roman
- Known for: Battle of Arausio (October 6, 105 BC); Social War (91–87 BC)
- Spouse(s): 1 unknown 2 Livia
- Children: Quintus Servilius Caepio; Servilia (mother of Brutus); Servilia Minor; Gnaeus Servilius Caepio
- Parents: Quintus Servilius Caepio (father); Caecilia Metella (mother)
- Relatives: Marcus Livius Drusus (double brother-in-law)

Quintus Servilius Caepio was a Roman patrician, statesman and soldier. He was the son of Quintus Servilius Caepio who was consul in 106 BCE and who lost his army during the Battle of Arausio (Caepio the Younger served under his father at Arausio). He was elected praetor some time in the last 90s BC and fought for Rome during the Social War. He was killed in the second year of the war while fighting the Marsi by Quintus Poppaedius Silo.

== Biography ==
=== Early life ===
Caepio was the son of Quintus Servilius Caepio. His mother was likely a daughter of Quintus Caecilius Metellus Macedonicus. He had at least two sisters, Servilia the wife of Marcus Livius Drusus is known, and the Servilia who married Quintus Lutatius Catulus might be another, but it is also possible that this woman was actually his aunt.

=== Career ===
Caepio served as quaestor in 103 or possibly 100. Previously his father had been tried before the people by the tribune Gaius Norbanus for his catastrophic loss at the Battle of Arausio; he was convicted and banished. In his quaestorship the younger Caepio used violence to oppose Lucius Appuleius Saturninus, a tribune of the plebs and a political ally of Norbanus, in Saturninus' attempt to pass a bill to sell grain at a deeply discounted price to the Roman people. In his role as quaestor urbanus he issued coins with the inscription ad frumentum emundum ex senatus consulto ('for the purchase of grain by order of the senate'), implying senate sponsorship of the grain law. Caepio was later brought to trial around 95 BC on maiestas charges from actions as quaestor, but – defended by Lucius Licinius Crassus – he was acquitted.

In 92 BC, Caepio prosecuted Marcus Aemilius Scaurus, the eminent princeps senatus, for alleged provincial extortion and taking bribes from Mithridates VI of Pontus. Scaurus filed a counter-suit against Caepio; eventually, both men were acquitted. Scaurus was apparently driven by the experience of the affair to side with Caepio's former brother-in-law, Livius Drusus, who was to be tribune in 91 BC. Broughton assigns a supposed praetorship to Caepio in (possibly) 91, but Sumner disputes this, saying there's no evidence that he held the office.

Caepio became a chief opponent of Marcus Livius Drusus' legislative programme for 91, which included laws aimed at giving full citizenship to the Italians and reform the jury pool for various criminal trials. In this he was aided by the then-consul Lucius Marcius Philippus. Pliny (NH 33.20) said that the dispute between the two started many years earlier because of a golden ring. Caepio, it was rumoured, was even involved in the assassination of Drusus, an event commonly seen by ancient sources as starting the Social War.

Early in 90 BC, Caepio initiated a suit with Quintus Varius Severus against Marcus Aemilius Scaurus for a second time but left to serve as legate in the Social War. Regardless, the suit against Scaurus was unsuccessful. During the Social War, Caepio served as a legate under the consul Publius Rutilius Lupus fighting the northern group of rebels. He defeated the Paeligni, a rebel tribe related to the Marruncini. After the death of Lupus he was made joint-commander of Rome's northern army with Gaius Marius. Marius had expected sole command and he did not get along with Caepio with disastrous results. After having dealt with a raiding legion of Marsi at Varnia, Caepio attempted to give Marius instructions, but Marius ignored them. Caepio was left on his own and was then obliged to move his legions back towards Caeoli. Once they reached the Arno at Sublaqueum they were tricked into leaving a secure position and attacked by the Marsi.

The opposing general, Q. Poppaedius [Silo] deserted to Caepio (though this was only pretence). As a pledge he brought with him his own sons (or so he pretended. They were in fact slave babies dressed with the purple-bordered garments of free-born children.) As further confirmation of his good faith he brought masses of gold and silver (which were actually lead, plated with precious metal). Poppaedius pointed out that with his 'defection' his own army was currently leaderless. If Caepio made haste he could capture the entire force. Completely deceived, Caepio followed to where Poppaedius said the army would be. This army was in fact hidden in ambush, and when Poppaedius ran up a hill as though to look for his men, this was the signal for them to spring from concealment. Caepio was cut to pieces, and so were his men.

Caepio's army was massacred, with Caepio being killed by the Marsi leader, Quintus Poppaedius Silo.

== Family ==
He likely had a son named Quintus from an early marriage to an unknown woman. Caepio later married Livia, sister of Marcus Livius Drusus, around 100 BC. Caepio and Livia had three children: Servilia, the mistress of Julius Caesar, mother of Brutus, and mother-in-law of Gaius Cassius Longinus; another daughter Servilia Minor; and a son, Gnaeus Servilius Caepio.

Caepio divorced Livia c. 97 BC after falling out with her brother. Livia subsequently remarried in c. 96 BC to Marcus Porcius Cato: their children were Marcus (the famous Cato the Younger) and Porcia. Both Livia and Porcius Cato died between 95 BC and 92 BC. As a result, all of Livia's children (including those by Caepio) grew up in the household of Livius Drusus, until the latter's assassination in 91 BC.

Brutus family tree

Salonia (2)	Cato the Elder	Licinia (1)
Marcus Porcius Cato Salonianus	Marcus Porcius Cato Licinianus	Marcus Livius Drusus
Marcus Porcius Cato (2)	Livia	Quintus Servilius Caepio (1)	Marcus Livius Drusus
Atilia (1)	Cato the Younger	Marcus Livius Drusus Claudianus, adopted son
Marcus Junius Brutus (1)	Servilia, mistress of Julius Caesar (see AUGUSTUS below)	Decimus Junius Silanus (2)	Servilia	Gnaeus Servilius Caepio	Lucius Appuleius SATURNINUS
Marcus Porcius Cato	Porcia	Marcus Junius Brutus†	Junia Prima	Junia Tertia	Gaius Cassius Longinus x	Marcus Aemilius Lepidus (consul 78 BC)	Appuleia, daughter of SATURNINUS
Junia Secunda	Marcus Aemilius Lepidus (triumvir)	Lucius Aemilius Paullus (consul 50 BC)
Descendant of POMPEY MAGNUS and Lucius Cornelius SULLA	son (perhaps Quintus Aemilius Lepdius?)	Marcus Aemilius Lepidus Minor (the Younger)	Servilia Isaurica, daughter of Junia Prima (see above) and Publius Servilius Isauricus	Emperor AUGUSTUS (possibly, see JULIO-CLAUDIANS for descendants)	Paullus Aemilius Lepidus	Cornelia, daughter of Gnaeus Cornelius Lentulus Marcellinus and Scribonia, wife of AUGUSTUS and mother of Julia the Elder
Manius Aemilius Lepidus	Aemilia Lepida II (also engaged to Lucius Caesar, see JULIO-CLAUDIANS and AUGUSTUS)	Publius Sulpicius Quirinius (of the Sulpicia gens, related to GALBA below)	Lucius Aemilius Paullus (consul 1)	Julia the Younger, daughter of Julia the Elder and Marcus Vispanius Agrippa, see AUGUSTUS and Cornelia above	Marcus Aemilius Lepidus (consul 6 AD)
daughter (perhaps known as Aemilia Lepida?)
Aemilia Lepida	Servius Sulpicius GALBA	Mamercus Aemilius Scaurus (of the Aemilia gens, related to the Lepidae)	Marcus Junius Silanus Torquatus (of the Junia gens, related to BRUTUS, see above)	Aemilia Lepida	CLAUDIUS (see AUGUSTUS above and JULIO-CLAUDIANS)	Lucius Vitellius (consul 34)	Livilla, daughter of Drusus the Elder and sister of Germanicus and CLAUDIUS, aunt of Drusus Caesar (see JULIO-CLAUDIANS and to the right)	Lucius Aelius Sejanus, the almost emperor	Aemilia Lepida	Drusus Caesar, son of Agrippina the Elder, daughter of Julia the Elder (see AUGUSTUS and Julia the Younger above and see JULIO-CLAUDIANS)
Gaius Cassius Longinus (descended from or related to GAIUS CASSIUS LONGINUS, see above)	Junia Lepida	Junia Calvina	Lucius Vitellius (consul 48)	Aulus VITELLIUS (for Otho's relation, in terms of the Year of the Four Emperors, he married Poppaea Sabina, who married NERO, see AUGUSTUS and CLAUDIUS above)
Cassia Longina	Gnaeus Domitius Corbulo, brother of Milona, wife of CALIGULA, see JULIO-CLAUDIANS and see above
Lucius Aelius Lamia Plautius Aelianus	Domitia Longina	Domitian, see FLAVIANS and VESPASIAN
Plautia (possibly existed, although unsure, but if so, then her brother is Lucius Fundanius Lamia Aelianus, father of Lucius Plautius Lamia Silvanus, alleged ancestor of Fabia Orestilla, wife of Gordian I, see GORDIANS)	Lucius Ceionius Commodus
Lucius Aelius Caesar	Marcus Aurelius (see NERVA-ANTONINES)
Lucius Verus (for further relations, see NERVA-ANTONINES)	Lucilla

(1): 1st spouse
(2): 2nd spouse
†: assassin of Caesar

== In fiction ==
Caepio appears as a major character in The First Man in Rome and The Grass Crown, the first two books of Colleen McCullough's Masters of Rome series. Plot points include Caepio's efforts to launder the Gold of Tolosa, which his father stole, and his opposition to Drusus's efforts to enfranchise Rome's Italian allies. This fictional Caepio is depicted as being divorced from Livia because of his cruelty towards her, rather than for purely political reasons.

== See also ==
- Servilia gens
