= Marcus Livius Drusus (reformer) =

Roman politician and reformer (c. 124 – 91 BC)

- Born: c. 124 BC
- Died: 91 BC
- Cause of death: Assassination
- Office: Aedile (94 BC); Tribune of the plebs (91 BC)
- Spouse: Servilia
- Children: Marcus Livius Drusus Claudianus (adopted) Livia (possibly)
- Parents: Marcus Livius Drusus (father); Cornelia (mother)

Marcus Livius Drusus (before 122 BC – 91 BC) was a Roman politician and reformer. He is most famous for his legislative programme during his term as tribune of the plebs in 91 BC. During his year in office, Drusus proposed wide-ranging legislative reforms, including offering citizenship to Rome's Italian allies.

The failure of these reforms, and Drusus' subsequent murder at the hands of an unknown assassin in late 91 BC, are often seen as an immediate cause of the Social War.

== Early life ==
Marcus Livius Drusus was born before 122 or 124 BC. He was the son of Cornelia (precise identity unknown) and the Marcus Livius Drusus who had served as tribune in 122 BC, consul in 112 BC, and censor in 109 BC. His father died in office during his censorship in 109.

If the younger Marcus was the eldest son, he would now have become the pater familias of the Drusi and the provider for his two siblings, Mamercus and Livia. However, certain scholars believe that Mamercus was in fact the eldest son, (Note: Among the Roman aristocracy, it was customary for first-born males to receive the same praenomen as their father. According to this principle, the younger Marcus ought to be the eldest child. However, prosopographers have suggested that Mamercus may be the eldest (surviving) child. If this is true, then the elder Drusus had a first-born child (sometime between c.130–125 BC), whom he named Marcus: however, this child died in infancy, meaning that the elder Drusus later re-used the praenomen 'Marcus' for his third-born son.) Marcus one or two years his junior.

Cicero reports that Drusus was a principled and conscientious youth. When serving as quaestor in Asia, possibly in 102 BC, he conspicuously refused to wear his official insignia as a sign of respect.

After the death of his father, Drusus inherited vast amounts of wealth, with which he paid for grand gladiatorial shows during his aedileship, possibly in 94 BC. (Note: Some scholars doubt the existence of this aedileship, since it does not appear on Drusus' preserved elogium (CIL 6.1312 = Inscr. Ital. 13.3.74), dating to the Augustan era. However, the elogia are not always one-hundred percent accurate, so the issue remains unanswered.) His generosity was famous in antiquity: he once commented that he spent so much money on other people that he had 'nothing left to give away to anybody but mud and air'. Drusus also built a grand new house on the Palatine Hill, telling the architect to build it so that all his fellow-citizens could see everything he did. This famous house was later owned by Cicero, Censorinus, and Rutilius Sisenna.

== Tribunate ==
Drusus was elected tribune of the plebs for 91 BC. Hostile propaganda later portrayed him as a demagogue from the outset of his tribunate, but Cicero and others assert that he began with the aim of strengthening senatorial rule and had the backing of the senate. This included the princeps senatus, Marcus Aemilius Scaurus, who had been the colleague of Drusus' father in the censorship of 109 BC; and Lucius Licinius Crassus, the most influential orator of the day.

His reform programme was hammered out within a large group of the leading senators. He intended to reinforce and restore the authority of the senate by inducting some 300 equites into the senatorial class while moving the jury pool for the permanent courts back to the senators. This was the "ultimate goal [to which] the entire legislative activity of Drusus was apparently directed". In his programme, he also included an agrarian bill along with extension of citizenship to the allies. The purpose of expanding citizenship would have been to give "further reinforcement of a moderate political position within a Roman governing class". However, not all of his senatorial allies agreed with his proposals: "the most obviously negative aspect of [Drusus' legislative] programme... was the unacceptable personal power which he would have achieved".

=== The Quaestio de Repetundis ===
==== History of the Equestrian Courts ====
The most important issue which Drusus and his backers sought to address concerned the composition of juries at trials for extortion. In 122 BC, Gaius Gracchus had made the juries for these courts (Latin, quaestio de repetundis) composed entirely of wealthy equites instead of senators. This gave the equestrians great judicial power, a fact resented by many senators, many of whom found the loss of their forensic role humiliating.

In 106 BC, Quintus Servilius Caepio had attempted to end the equestrian monopoly on juries by proposing a law to introduce mixed senatorial–equestrian juries. However, despite the famous support of Lucius Crassus, this Lex Servilia was replaced after only two years by a law of Gaius Servilius Glaucia which restored the equestrian monopoly.

Over time, the equestrian jurors proved reluctant to give guilty verdicts. Of the many political prosecutions in the years 99-92 BC, not a single individual was condemned under their courts; this created great frustration in the Senate, as it paralysed one of the main avenues of political rivalry. As a result, a growing number of eminent senators came to believe that the equestrian monopoly had to be ended.

This resentment was intensified by the prosecution and exile of the esteemed consularis Publius Rutilius Rufus in ca. 92 BC. Rutilius Rufus had served as legatus to Quintus Mucius Scaevola Pontifex during the latter's governorship in Asia. They had famously opposed the rapacity of the equestrian businessmen operating in the province, gaining much praise from the provincials and the Senate but hostility from the equites. In retaliation, the equestrians brought about Rufus' prosecution in one of their own courts when he returned to Rome. Although Rufus was likely innocent, the jury nonetheless found him guilty, and he was sent into exile to Smyrna. The injustice of the affair was compounded by Rutilius Rufus' calm, Stoical acceptance of his fate, and his case was long a byword for unjust sentences.

Since Rutilius Rufus was one of Drusus' uncles, his scandalous exile likely provided the immediate incentive for Drusus' reforms.

==== Drusus' reform ====
The exact form of Drusus' solution to this problem is unclear. Appian says that Drusus proposed to include 300 new equites into the Senate, and that future jurors would now be drawn from the enlarged pool of senators. However, Livy states that Drusus introduced juries comprising a mix of senators and equites, with no enlargement of the Senate. Since Appian is notoriously unreliable for this period, some scholars believe Appian has conflated Drusus' proposal with the actual expansion of the Senate that took place ten years later under Sulla's regime.

=== Supplementary legislation ===
In order to gain popular support for his jury law, Drusus put forward a number of supplementary bills. (Note: Appian thinks that Drusus' proposal to extend Roman citizenship to all the Italian allies was put forward at this early stage, in order to attract support for his other laws (Appian, Civil Wars 1.35–6). However, recent scholarship has questioned the accuracy of Appian's narrative at this point. Eg Henrik Mouritsen, Italian Unification: A Study in Ancient and Modern Historiography (London: 1998). It has been suggested, for instance, that the enfranchisement of Italy would be a highly controversial proposal. Not only would the roll of citizens increase exponentially with such a bill, but it would involve a fundamental reorganisation of all aspects of Roman society, from the army to taxation to the law. It would seem questionable therefore for Drusus to propose this deeply divisive bill at the start of his tribunate, when he was still positioning himself as a champion of tradition and the concordia ordinum (Cicero, De Oratore 1.7.24). Modern scholars therefore tend to take the side of Velleius Paterculus, whose narrative puts the Italian bill after the rest of Drusus' legislation (Vel. Pat. 2.14.1).) To gain support from the plebeians, he passed a land law, which seems to have proposed the redistribution of public land (Ager publicus) to the poor as well as the creation of new colonies in Italy and Sicily. He then assigned himself a place on the board of ten commissioners tasked with carrying out the redistributions. To attract further support, Drusus may also have passed a law reducing the price of grain.

Alongside these popularist bills, Drusus passed a law making the equestrians liable to prosecution for bribery. He may also have deliberately debased the coinage by adding one-eighth of bronze to the silver coins, perhaps in order to help pay for his agrarian redistributions. (Note: It is not clear whether the 'Marcus Livius Drusus' in question was the elder or younger Drusus: as a result, it may well have been Drusus' father who had debased the coinage at an earlier date.) All these bills were likely passed in the early months of 91 BC.

== Opposition to legislation ==
=== Senatorial opposition ===
Despite support from notable backers, Drusus' legislation attracted powerful opposition, including the consul Lucius Marcius Philippus. Also among Drusus' opponents was the praetor Servilius Caepio, his former brother-in-law. On the day of voting, Philippus tried to stop proceedings, and was only deterred when one of Drusus' supporters throttled the consul to the point that he started bleeding. When Caepio continued to oppose the legislation, Drusus threatened to have the praetor hurled from the Tarpeian Rock, an archaic punishment for treasonable magistrates. Eventually, Drusus passed his legislation by combining all the various bills into one law – a practice that had been banned several years previously under the terms of the lex Caecilia Didia.

By September, momentum was turning against Drusus and his backers. Senators in the Roman Republic were deeply wary of any one individual gaining extraordinary personal power; as a result, Drusus' popularity with the people lost him support in the Senate, where it was feared he was becoming dangerously influential in the model of the Gracchi or Lucius Appuleius Saturninus.

The consul Philippus called for the abrogation of Drusus' laws, and a heated exchange took place on 13 September in the Senate House between Philippus and Lucius Crassus. Philippus claimed he could no longer work with the current Senate, to which Crassus retorted by calling Philippus' status as consul into question, remarking 'Should I consider you a consul, when you don't think that I am a senator?' However, this was to be Crassus' 'last swan-song', in Cicero's words, as he suddenly died a week later.

=== Italian proposal and abrogation of the laws ===
With Crassus dead, Drusus was robbed of one of his most influential backers. Now, late in 91 BC, he turned towards soliciting support from the Italian allies. It seems Drusus already had close contacts among the Italians, as the important Marsic aristocrat Quintus Poppaedius Silo, who would later serve as the main Italian commander in the Social War, was a regular guest at his house.

However, Drusus' proposal attracted more opposition, as many senators feared the personal power Drusus would gain from mass enfranchisement. (Note: On the ancients' fear of one man growing too powerful as a result of enfranchisement: 'a free state will become a monarchy, if a huge multitude attains the citizenship by virtue of the activity of one man' ('Sallust', ep. ad Caes. II. 6. 1.).) Rumours apparently circulated that the Italians had sworn a sacred oath pledging allegiance to Drusus alone, a version of which is preserved in Diodorus Siculus:

I swear by Jupiter Capitolinus, by Vesta of Rome, by Mars her ancestral god, by Sol the founder of the race, and by Terra the benefactress of animals and plants, likewise by the demigods who founded Rome and by the heroes who have contributed to increase her empire, that I will count the friend and foe of Drusus my friend and foe, and that I will spare neither property nor the lives of my children or parents except as it be to the advantage of Drusus and of those who have taken this oath. If I become a citizen by the law of Drusus, I shall consider Rome my country and Drusus my greatest benefactor.

It was also around this point that Drusus apparently suffered a minor breakdown or epileptic fit, prompting a flood of supportive messages from the Italian towns.

Seeing the opposition in Rome to the bill, some of the Italians grew increasingly agitated. Diodorus Siculus reports that Quintus Poppaedius Silo led 10,000 allies in a protest march on Rome, while Florus remarks that Drusus' public meetings attracted such huge crowds that it seemed as though all of Rome were under siege. Eventually, a plot was hatched by the Italians to assassinate the consuls on the Alban Mount. This was only foiled when Drusus himself caught wind of it and warned Philippus. The Italians also began secret preparations for an armed conflict, including trading hostages and gathering weapons.

In this tense climate of political disputes, alleged assassination plots, and Italian discontent, Philippus finally succeeded in persuading the Senate to abolish all of Drusus' legislation. The justification was twofold: firstly, that the laws had been passed in contravention of the sacred auspices, meaning they were contrary to the will of the gods; and secondly, that they had contravened the Lex Caecilia Didia of 98 BC.

=== Assassination ===
Though he publicly denounced the senatorial decree, Drusus did not attempt to use his veto to oppose it. He was already being prosecuted for his alleged involvement in the Alban Mount plot, and seems to have recognised that opposition was futile.

It was at this point, sometime around September 91 BC, that Drusus was assassinated. According to some ancient sources, the murder took place inside the atrium of Drusus' own house. Other sources say he was stabbed whilst walking back from the Forum. Philippus and Caepio were blamed by some for the assassination, as was Quintus Varius Hybrida, the tribune of 90 BC who later created a special court to prosecute Drusus' supporters.

== Legacy ==
Since the Social War (91–87 BC) began almost immediately after his assassination, many Romans blamed Drusus for the war:

Accordingly when the citizenship promised to the allies was not forthcoming, the Italians in their anger began to plot revolt ... Marcus Livius Drusus, of whom even the Senate had come to disapprove, was the author of the Social War, and was as a result killed at his home; no-one knows by whom.

After Drusus' murder, a special court was set up under the lex Varia to prosecute those who, like Drusus, were suspected of encouraging the Italians to revolt. Drusus' friend Gaius Aurelius Cotta was among the exiled, while his mentor Marcus Scaurus, the princeps senatus, was also accused.

In the longer term, later generations of Roman historians considered Drusus' tribunate a critical milestone in the Crisis of the Roman Republic. Appian, Livy, and Florus all placed Drusus' "seditio" within a clear sequence of similar disorders. In their analysis, he followed the examples of the Gracchi and of Saturninus, and was succeeded by the sedition of Gaius Marius and Publius Sulpicius Rufus. Thus Drusus' original position as champion of the Senate was forgotten by these authors, who instead emphasised the turbulence of his tribunate and his role in the start of the Social War.

Though accepting that his promises to the Italians in the year 91 BC directly precipitated the outbreak of the Social War, many modern scholars are more forgiving of Drusus. Theodore Mommsen considered him a genuine reformer, a progressive who attempted to resolve some of the most pressing issues of the day in an age when few others were willing to do likewise. In the judgement of the Italian scholar Emilio Gabba:

Drusus' complex scheme seems to be directed by a precise and shrewd awareness of the historical situation, the political forces at work, and the needs and interests which these forces represented and conveyed. It reveals a political capacity which matched that of Gaius Gracchus.

== Family ==
Drusus had several distinguished descendants. Through his adopted son, he became an ancestor of the Julio-Claudian dynasty; and through the two marriages of his sister, Livia, he was uncle to Cato the Younger and great-uncle to Marcus Junius Brutus. His brother, Mamercus Aemilius Lepidus Livianus (who was adopted into the Aemilii Lepidi), also served as consul in 77 BC.

At some point ca. 100 BC, Drusus married Servilia, a sister of his friend Quintus Servilius Caepio. However, they appear to have divorced sometime around the year 97 BC without having any known children. It seems that Drusus did not marry again before his death in 91 BC. However there is a Livia of the late Roman Republic who has been speculated to be Drusus' daughter.

=== Imperial descendants ===
Drusus did adopt Marcus Livius Drusus Claudianus, born Appius Claudius Pulcher. This adopted son married Alfidia, with whom he had a daughter named Livia. This Livia was the famous Empress, the wife to the emperor Augustus and mother of the second emperor Tiberius. Therefore, through the adoption of his son, Marcus Livius Drusus and his family (the Drusi) became eventual ancestors to the imperial Julio-Claudian dynasty.

=== Nieces and nephews ===
Drusus had a sister, Livia, whom he married to his friend and brother-in-law Quintus Servilius Caepio. Livia and Caepio had three children: the famous Servilia, who was sequentially the mistress of Julius Caesar and the mother of Marcus Junius Brutus; another Servilia, who married the general Lucullus; and a son, also called Gnaeus Servilius Caepio.

However, Drusus and Caepio fell out, allegedly over the sale of a ring at an auction, and subsequently they became personal enemies. As a result, Drusus divorced Servilia, and Caepio divorced Livia.

Drusus apparently had his sister remarried almost immediately, either in 97 or 96 BC, this time to Marcus Porcius Cato, the grandson of Cato the Elder. Livia and Cato had a son, Marcus Porcius Cato Uticensis, who was to become the famous opponent of Julius Caesar; they also had a daughter, Porcia, who married Lucius Domitius Ahenobarbus. However, both Livia and Cato seem to have died in the mid to late 90s BC, meaning that Servilia, Cato, and Porcia were all raised in Drusus' house before his own death in 91 BC.

=== Family tree ===
Brutus family tree

Salonia (2)	Cato the Elder	Licinia (1)
Marcus Porcius Cato Salonianus	Marcus Porcius Cato Licinianus	Marcus Livius Drusus
Marcus Porcius Cato (2)	Livia	Quintus Servilius Caepio (1)	Marcus Livius Drusus
Atilia (1)	Cato the Younger	Marcus Livius Drusus Claudianus, adopted son
Marcus Junius Brutus (1)	Servilia, mistress of Julius Caesar (see AUGUSTUS below)	Decimus Junius Silanus (2)	Servilia	Gnaeus Servilius Caepio	Lucius Appuleius SATURNINUS
Marcus Porcius Cato	Porcia	Marcus Junius Brutus†	Junia Prima	Junia Tertia	Gaius Cassius Longinus x	Marcus Aemilius Lepidus (consul 78 BC)	Appuleia, daughter of SATURNINUS
Junia Secunda	Marcus Aemilius Lepidus (triumvir)	Lucius Aemilius Paullus (consul 50 BC)
Descendant of POMPEY MAGNUS and Lucius Cornelius SULLA	son (perhaps Quintus Aemilius Lepdius?)	Marcus Aemilius Lepidus Minor (the Younger)	Servilia Isaurica, daughter of Junia Prima (see above) and Publius Servilius Isauricus	Emperor AUGUSTUS (possibly, see JULIO-CLAUDIANS for descendants)	Paullus Aemilius Lepidus	Cornelia, daughter of Gnaeus Cornelius Lentulus Marcellinus and Scribonia, wife of AUGUSTUS and mother of Julia the Elder
Manius Aemilius Lepidus	Aemilia Lepida II (also engaged to Lucius Caesar, see JULIO-CLAUDIANS and AUGUSTUS)	Publius Sulpicius Quirinius (of the Sulpicia gens, related to GALBA below)	Lucius Aemilius Paullus (consul 1)	Julia the Younger, daughter of Julia the Elder and Marcus Vispanius Agrippa, see AUGUSTUS and Cornelia above	Marcus Aemilius Lepidus (consul 6 AD)
daughter (perhaps known as Aemilia Lepida?)
Aemilia Lepida	Servius Sulpicius GALBA	Mamercus Aemilius Scaurus (of the Aemilia gens, related to the Lepidae)	Marcus Junius Silanus Torquatus (of the Junia gens, related to BRUTUS, see above)	Aemilia Lepida	CLAUDIUS (see AUGUSTUS above and JULIO-CLAUDIANS)	Lucius Vitellius (consul 34)	Livilla, daughter of Drusus the Elder and sister of Germanicus and CLAUDIUS, aunt of Drusus Caesar (see JULIO-CLAUDIANS and to the right)	Lucius Aelius Sejanus, the almost emperor	Aemilia Lepida	Drusus Caesar, son of Agrippina the Elder, daughter of Julia the Elder (see AUGUSTUS and Julia the Younger above and see JULIO-CLAUDIANS)
Gaius Cassius Longinus (descended from or related to GAIUS CASSIUS LONGINUS, see above)	Junia Lepida	Junia Calvina	Lucius Vitellius (consul 48)	Aulus VITELLIUS (for Otho's relation, in terms of the Year of the Four Emperors, he married Poppaea Sabina, who married NERO, see AUGUSTUS and CLAUDIUS above)
Cassia Longina	Gnaeus Domitius Corbulo, brother of Milona, wife of CALIGULA, see JULIO-CLAUDIANS and see above
Lucius Aelius Lamia Plautius Aelianus	Domitia Longina	Domitian, see FLAVIANS and VESPASIAN
Plautia (possibly existed, although unsure, but if so, then her brother is Lucius Fundanius Lamia Aelianus, father of Lucius Plautius Lamia Silvanus, alleged ancestor of Fabia Orestilla, wife of Gordian I, see GORDIANS)	Lucius Ceionius Commodus
Lucius Aelius Caesar	Marcus Aurelius (see NERVA-ANTONINES)
Lucius Verus (for further relations, see NERVA-ANTONINES)	Lucilla

(1): 1st spouse
(2): 2nd spouse
†: assassin of Caesar

== See also ==
- Livia gens

== Sources ==
- Badian, Ernst (2014). "Livius Drusus (2), Marcus". In Hornblower, Simon; Spawforth, Antony; Eidinow, Esther (eds.). The Oxford companion to classical civilization (2nd ed.). New York: Oxford University Press. ISBN 978-0-19-177848-3. OCLC 900444999.
- Brunt, PA (1988). The fall of the Roman republic and related essays. Clarendon. ISBN 0-19-814849-6. OCLC 799090262.
- Broughton, TRS (1951). Magistrates of the Roman Republic. Vol. 1. American Philological Association.
- Broughton, Thomas Robert Shannon (1952). The magistrates of the Roman republic. Vol. 2. New York: American Philological Association.
- Evans, Richard J (2003). Stewart, Tim (ed.). Questioning reputations: essays on nine roman republican politicians. Pretoria: University of South Africa. ISBN 1-86888-198-9. OCLC 52037508.
- Flower, Harriet I. (2010). Roman republics. Princeton: Princeton University Press. ISBN 978-0-691-14043-8. OCLC 301798480.
- Gabba, E (1992). "Rome and Italy: the Social war". In Crook, John; Lintott, Andrew; Rawson, Elizabeth (eds.). The Cambridge ancient history. Vol. 9 (2nd ed.). Cambridge University Press. ISBN 0-521-85073-8. OCLC 121060.
- Mouritsen, Henrik (2017). Politics in the Roman Republic. Cambridge University Press. ISBN 9781107031883.
- Sumner, GV (1973). The orators in Cicero's "Brutus". University of Toronto Press. ISBN 978-1-4875-8553-2.
