= Quintus Servilius Caepio (adoptive father of Brutus) =

Roman aristocrat

Quintus Servilius Caepio (fl. 68–58 BC) was a Roman aristocrat and the adoptive father of Brutus, an assassin of Julius Caesar.

== Biography ==
Geiger conjectured that Caepio was a son of Quintus Servilius Caepio, from an unknown wife before Livia. This would make the younger Caepio an elder half-brother of Servilia the mother of Brutus, and a different man from Cato the Younger's half brother Servilius Caepio. Marshall found Geiger's argument compelling, as did Strachan, but Treggiari was skeptical.

According to a tentative reconstruction of his life, Caepio may have held the quaestorship by about 69 BC, which would have given him senatorial rank. He then served as a deputy (legatus) to the general Pompey in the campaign against the Cilician pirates and then in the Mithridatic War.

By 59 BC, he had adopted his relative Brutus. In 58 BC, he appears for the last time in history as a creditor of Quintus Tullius Cicero, and probably died not long after. He is believed to have been married to a daughter of Quintus Hortensius, (possibly the orator Hortensia) since an inscription describes Hortensius son Hortalus as Brutus' uncle.

== Identification with Julia's fiancé ==
In 59 BC a Servilius Caepio supported Julius Caesar against the other consul of that year, Marcus Bibulus, and was by that time betrothed to Caesar's daughter Julia, but in the end she was given instead to Caesar's ally, Pompey. This Caepio was then promised to Pompey's own daughter, (Note: Only one is known, Pompeia Magna.) but it is unknown if the union ever cemented. This reconstruction depends on the identity of several Servilii and Caepiones in scattered mentions, which is doubted by Treggiari. Pelling also doubts the identity of the Julia's betrothed with Brutus's adoptive father.

== Sources ==
- Geiger, Joseph (1973). "The Last Servilii Caepiones of the Republic". Ancient Society. 4: 143–156. ISSN 0066-1619. JSTOR 44080221.
- Marshall, Bruce A. (1987). "The Engagement of Faustus Sulla and Pompeia". Ancient Society. 18: 91–101. doi:10.2143/AS.18.0.2011358. ISSN 0066-1619. JSTOR 44034973.
- Treggiari, Susan (2019). Servilia and her Family. Oxford University Press. ISBN 978-0-19-882934-8.
