= Porcia (sister of Cato the Younger) =

- Born: Rome
- Died: Rome
- Spouse: Lucius Domitius Ahenobarbus
- Children: Gnaeus Domitius Ahenobarbus
- Parents: Marcus Porcius Cato (father); Livia (mother)

Porcia (before 95 BC – 46/45 BC), was the daughter of Marcus Porcius Cato and Livia.

== Biography ==
=== Early life ===
She was the elder sister of Cato the Younger and the younger half-sister of Servilia, Servilia Minor and Gnaeus Servilius Caepio. After her parents died, she lived with all her siblings in the household of their uncle Marcus Livius Drusus until his assassination in 91 BC.

=== Marriage ===
She married Lucius Domitius Ahenobarbus, who was consul in 54 BC and an ally of her brother Cato. They had a son named Gnaeus Domitius Ahenobarbus. They also probably had another son who was given in adoption to an Atilius Serrannus.

Marcus Tullius Cicero claims that Porcia and her husband were in Naples in 49 BC, when her husband was besieged at Corfinium by Julius Caesar. In 48 BC, Porcia lost her husband in the Battle of Pharsalus. Porcia died towards the end of 46 BC to the beginning of 45 BC, her funeral elegy was pronounced by Cicero, who greatly commended her virtues.

== See also ==
- Porcia gens
