= 80s BC =

Decade

A map of Greece, Anatolia and the Middle East in 89 BC on the eve of the First Mithridatic War.

80s BC is the time period from 89 BC – 80 BC.

In the Roman Republic, the Social War ends, successfully putting down rebellion in Italy, and giving free Italians full citizenship. Sulla, a general during the Social War, marched on Rome and won a civil war. The First Mithridatic War occurs from 89-85 BC as Mithridates VI of Pontus attempted to gain control of Anatolia and ancient Greece from the Roman Republic. Sulla was declared a public enemy in the Roman Republic, but he defeats Mithridates VI and gains control of Greece and western Anatolia. The Second Mithridatic War breaks out two years later, after Lucius Licinius Murena, the governor of Roman Asia, clashes with the army of Pontus. Sulla takes control of Rome in 82 BC, and becomes Roman dictator.

In China, Emperor Wu of Han dies after a 54 year long reign, and Zhao of Han becomes Emperor. The Discourses on Salt and Iron was held, debating the economic policies of the Han dynasty. The Nabataean Kingdom defeated the Seleucid Empire at the Battle of Cana, killing the Seleucid king Antiochus XII Dionysus. Tigranes the Great of Armenia effectively ended Seleucid rule in 83 BC after being invited to the Seleucid Dynastic Wars. Burebista unified the Dacian people and became the first king of Dacia in 82 BC. In Egypt, Berenice III ruled up to 80 BC, when she was murdered by her husband, Ptolemy XI Alexander II. Ptolemy XI Alexander II is soon deposed by Ptolemy XII Auletes as pharaoh of Egypt and Alexandria comes under Roman jurisdiction.

== Events ==
=== 89 BC ===
==== By place ====
====== Roman Republic ======
- Consuls: Gnaeus Pompeius Strabo and Lucius Porcius Cato.
- Social War:
  - Roman forces under Lucius Porcius Cato are defeated by the Italian rebels in the Battle of Fucine Lake, Cato is killed.
  - The Roman army of Gnaeus Pompeius Strabo decisively defeats the rebels in the Battle of Asculum.
- Lex Plautia Papiria extends citizenship to all Italians who applied for it within 60 days. The new citizens are enrolled in eight designated tribes, to prevent domination of the assemblies.
- Lex Pompeia grants Latin rights to cities in Cisalpine Gaul.
- Pompeii is annexed by the Roman Republic.
- Cicero ends his service in the Roman army.

====== Asia Minor ======
- Mithridates VI of Pontus invades Bithynia and Cappadocia, thus beginning the First Mithridatic War.

====== Xiongnu ======
- The former Han General-in-Chief Li Guangli, now the son-in-law of Hulugu Chanyu, is arrested and sacrificed to the gods to restore the health of Hulugu's mother.

=== 88 BC ===
==== By place ====
====== Roman Republic ======
- The Social War ends with the defeat of the Italian allies by the Romans.
- August: The consul Lucius Cornelius Sulla becomes the first Roman commander to march on Rome with his army and to capture the city by force. This extraordinary act is prompted by his desire to maintain his proconsular command for the First Mithridatic War in Asia Minor. Sulla then murdered his enemy P. Sulpicius Rufus and forced Gaius Marius to flee to Africa.
- The Dardani, Scordisci, and the Maedi attack the Roman province of Macedonia.

====== Greece ======
- May – King Mithridates VI of Pontus invades Greece. Defeating the Roman forces four times in succession, he conquers Bithynia, Phrygia, Mysia, Lycia, Pamphylia, Ionia and Cappadocia. The Roman province of Asia is dismantled. On the king's orders, the local authorities in every city of the province round up and put to death all resident Italians in a single day (App.Mith.§§85–91). Plutarch (Sulla 24.4) says that 150,000 are killed, other sources calculate a figure of 80,000 people.

====== China ======
- Emperor Wu of Han makes preparations for the six-year-old Liu Fuling to be made Crown Prince and establishes Huo Guang as the future regent. The emperor executes Fuling's mother Lady Gouyi so that she cannot dominate the state while Fuling is a child emperor.

=== 87 BC ===
==== By place ====
====== Roman Republic ======
- Gnaeus Octavius and Lucius Cornelius Cinna are inaugurated as consuls. With Cinna seeking to enrol the Italians into all the tribes per vim, he is expelled from the city by Octavius and replaced as consul by Lucius Merula. Mobilising against the regime at Rome, Cinna marches on the city, occupies it with the support of Gaius Marius, and regains his consulship. In the aftermath Octavius is killed, Merula is forced to suicide.
- First Mithridatic War: Siege of Athens (87–86 BC) – Sulla arrives in Greece and from Autumn besieges Athens. He orders Lucius Licinius Lucullus to raise a fleet from Rome's allies around the eastern Mediterranean.

====== China ======
- March 29 – Emperor Wu of Han dies after a 54-year reign in which he leads the Han dynasty (China) through its greatest expansion. The Empire's borders span from modern Kyrgyzstan in the west, to Mongolia in the north, to Korea in the east, and to northern Vietnam in the south.
- March 30 – The eight-year-old Liu Fuling becomes emperor, with Huo Guang General-in-Chief and regent.

==== By topic ====
====== Technology ======
- Antikythera mechanism manufactured.

=== 86 BC ===
==== By place ====
====== Roman Republic ======
- First Mithridatic War
  - March 1 – Siege of Athens (87–86 BC) ends when Sulla captures Athens from the Pontic army, removing the tyrant Aristion.
  - Lucius Licinius Lucullus decisively defeats the Mithridatic fleet in the Battle of Tenedos.
  - The Roman forces of Lucius Cornelius Sulla defeat the Pontic forces of Archelaus in the Battle of Chaeronea.
  - The Dardani ally with Pontus and are defeated by Sulla soon after.

=== 85 BC ===
==== By place ====
====== Roman Republic ======
- First Mithridatic War: Lucius Cornelius Sulla again defeats Archelaus in the decisive Battle of Orchomenus.

=== 84 BC ===
==== By place ====
====== Asia ======
- Battle of Cana: The Arab Nabataean Kingdom decisively defeats the Greek Seleucid Empire, slaying King Antiochus XII Dionysus, at modern-day Umm Qais in Jordan.

====== Roman Republic ======
- The First Mithridatic War comes to an end.
- Julius Caesar marries Cornelia

=== 83 BC ===
==== By place ====
====== Roman Republic ======
- Spring – Lucius Cornelius Sulla returns to Italy from his campaigns in Greece and lands with his legions unopposed at Brundisium. He defeats the popular forces of Gaius Norbanus in the Battle of Mount Tifata.
- Gnaeus Pompeius, age 22, raises, on his own initiative, a private army of three legions from his father's veterans and clientelae in Picenum.
- Lucius Licinius Murena, the Roman governor of Asia, clashes with the Pontic forces of Mithridates VI, starting the Second Mithridatic War.
- A fire breaks out which burns down the Temple of Jupiter (Jupiter Capitolinus) and destroys the collection of Sibylline Books.
- Two new buildings were completed on the Capitoline Hill in Rome: the Temple of Jupitor Optimus Maximus and the Tabularium.

====== Syria ======
- Tigranes the Great, King of Armenia was invited by a faction in the Seleucid civil wars, entered Syria and effectively ended Seleucid rule. Though a weakened Seleucid monarchy was briefly restored after Roman victories, ongoing instability led Pompey to abolish the dynasty and annex Syria as a Roman province in 63 BC.

=== 82 BC ===
==== By place ====
====== Roman Republic ======
- April: Sulla defeats the consul Gaius Marius the Younger at the Battle of Sacriportus, and takes control of Rome.
- November 1: Sulla defeats an army of Samnites and Lucanians alliance in the Battle of the Colline Gate.
- November 2: Sulla slaughters the Samnite prisoners in the Villa publica; the senate rejects his proscription plan.
- November 3: Sulla passes his proscription through a popular assembly; he publishes a list of 520 senators and equites to be murdered on sight.
- Gaius Marius the Younger is besieged at the fortress city of Praeneste in Latium. After a fierce resistance, Marius commits suicide.
- Pompey is ordered by Sulla to stamp out Marian rebels in Sicily and Africa, after his campaigns in he gets the insulting nickname of adulescentulus carnifex, the "teenage butcher".
- Lucius Licinius Murena launches a raid against Pontus in the Battle of Halys, starting the Second Mithridatic War.

====== Dacia ======
- Burebista unifies the Dacian population forming the first (and biggest) unified Dacian Kingdom, on the territory of modern Romania and surroundings. 82 BC is also the starting year of his reign.

==== By topic ====
====== Astronomy ======
- The Aurigid shower parent comet C/1911 N1 (Kiess) returns to the inner solar system and sheds the dust particles that one revolution later cause the 1935, 1986, 1994, and 2007 Aurigid meteor outbursts on Earth.

=== 81 BC ===
==== By place ====
====== Roman Republic ======
- Sulla is appointed dictator, executes his political enemies in a series of proscriptions, and implements aristocratic reforms to the Roman government.
- The Second Mithridatic War ends with the status quo.
- Cicero wins his first case.

====== China ======
- Sang Hongyang and 60 Confucian scholars debate over the state monopoly of Iron and Salt.

=== 80 BC ===
==== By place ====
====== Roman Republic ======
- Quintus Sertorius re-enters Iberia with a tiny army (2,600 men) and opens a successful campaign against the Sullan forces.
- Battle of the Baetis River: A force of Populares exiles under Sertorius defeat the legal Roman army of Lucius Fulfidias in Hispania, starting the Sertorian War; Quintus Caecilius Metellus Pius takes command on behalf of Sulla.
- Pompeii becomes the Roman colony Colonia Cornelia Veneria Pompei when Sulla occupies the city with at least 4,000 soldier-colonizers.

====== Egypt ======
- Ptolemy XII Auletes succeeds Ptolemy XI Alexander II to the throne of Egypt.
- Ptolemy XI marries Berenice III, but murders his bride for unknown reasons.
- Alexandria comes under Roman jurisdiction.

==== By topic ====
====== Art ======
- Roman artists begin to extend the space of a room visually with painted scenes of figures on a shallow stage or with a landscape or cityscape.

====== Literature ======
- Meleager publishes his Garland, the earliest known anthology of Greek poetry.

== Births ==
89 BC

- Empress Shangguan, wife to Emperor Zhao of Han (d. 37 BC)

87 BC

- Lucius Munatius Plancus, Roman consul (approximate date)

86 BC

- October 1 – Sallust, Roman historian (d. 34 BC)
- Fausta Cornelia, twin sister of Faustus Cornelius Sulla, wife of Gaius Memmius and later of Titus Annius Milo
- Faustus Cornelius Sulla, Roman senator, son of the dictator Lucius Cornelius Sulla (d. 46 BC)

85 BC

- Atia, niece of Julius Caesar and mother of Augustus (d. 43 BC)
- Marcus Junius Brutus, conspirator and assassin in the murder of Julius Caesar (approximate date)
- Tiberius Claudius Nero, Roman politician and father of Tiberius (d. 33 BC)

84 BC

- Catullus, Roman poet (approximate date) (d. c. 54 BC)
- Servilius Casca, Roman politician (d. c. 42 BC)
- Surena, Parthian general (d. 53 BC)

83 BC

- Fulvia, Roman matron and wife of Mark Antony (approximate date)
- Julia, daughter of Julius Caesar and Cornelia
- Mark Antony, Roman politician and General (who later married Cleopatra) (approximate date) (d. 30 BC)

82 BC

- May 28 – Licinius Macer Calvus, Roman orator and poet (d. c. 47 BC)
- Marcus Caelius Rufus, Roman orator and politician (d. c. 48 BC)
- Varro Atacinus, Roman poet and writer (d. c. 35 BC)
- Vercingetorix, Gaul warrior and leader (d. 46 BC)

80 BC

- Scribonia, wife to the Roman Emperor Augustus (approximate date) (d. AD 16)

== Deaths ==
89 BC

- Aulus Sempronius Asellio, Roman praetor (murdered by creditors)
- Lucius Porcius Cato, Roman politician and general
- Marcus Aemilius Scaurus, Roman politician (b. c. 163 BC)
- Titus Didius, killed in battle during the Social War
- Li Guangli, Chinese General-in-Chief (Han dynasty)

88 BC

- Demetrius III Eucaerus, king of the Seleucid Empire
- Gnaeus Domitius Ahenobarbus, Roman consul
- Lady Gouyi, mother of Zhao of Han (b. 113)
- Manius Aquillius, Roman consul and general
- Ptolemy X Alexander I, king (pharaoh) of Egypt
- Publius Sulpicius Rufus, Roman tribune of the plebs, murdered by Sulla
- Quintus Mucius Scaevola Augur, Roman consul
- Quintus Poppaedius Silo, Italian tribe leader

87 BC

- March 29 – Han Wudi, emperor of the Han dynasty (b. 157 BC)
- Apollodorus of Artemita, Greek writer
- Gaius Atilius Serranus, Roman consul and senator
- Gaius Julius Caesar Strabo, Roman politician
- Gnaeus Pompeius Strabo, Roman general and politician
- Gotarzes I, ruler (shah) of the Parthian Empire
- Lucius Cornelius Merula, Roman politician and priest
- Lucius Julius Caesar, Roman consul (killed by partisans of Gaius Marius)
- Marcus Antonius, Roman consul (executed by order of Marius and Cinna)
- Publius Licinius Crassus, Roman consul and censor (killed by Marians invading Rome)
- Quintus Ancharius, Roman politician (executed by order of Marius and Cinna)

86 BC

- January 13 – Gaius Marius, Roman general and politician (b. c. 157 BC)
- March 1 – Aristion, Greek philosopher and tyrant
- Jin Midi, Chinese politician and co-regent (b. 134 BC)
- Sima Qian, Chinese historian (b. 145 BC)

85 BC

- Gaius Julius Caesar, Roman politician (b. c. 140 BC)
- Mnesarchus of Athens, Stoic philosopher (b. c. 160 BC)
- Lucius Valerius Flaccus

84 BC

- Apellicon of Teos, Greek book collector (approximate date)
- Gaius Flavius Fimbria, Roman politician and general (suicide)
- Lucius Cornelius Cinna, Roman consul (killed by mutinying troops)
- Antiochus XII Dionysus, king of the Seleucid Empire (killed in battle)

83 BC

- Philip I Philadelphus, Seleucid king (approximate date)

82 BC

- Gaius Carrinas, Roman politician and general (executed by order of Sulla)
- Gaius Fabius Hadrianus, Roman politician and governor
- Gaius Marcius Censorinus, Roman politician and general (executed by order of Sulla)
- Gaius Marius the Younger, Roman politician (commits suicide)
- Gaius Norbanus, Roman consul and governor (commits suicide)
- Gnaeus Papirius Carbo, Roman consul (executed by order of Sulla)
- Marcus Marius Gratidianus, Roman praetor and politician (executed by order of Sulla)
- Quintus Mucius Scaevola Pontifex, Roman consul (murdered by order of Marius the Younger)
- Quintus Valerius Soranus, Roman politician and Latin poet (executed by order of Sulla)

81 BC

- Artaxias I (or Arshak), king of Iberia (Georgia)
- Gnaeus Domitius Ahenobarbus, Roman politician
- Ptolemy IX Lathyros, king of Ptolemaic Egypt

80 BC

- Berenice III, queen regnant of Egypt (b. 120 BC)
- Caecilia Metella Dalmatica, daughter of Lucius Caecilius Metellus Dalmaticus (approximate date)
- Lucius Cornelius Chrysogonus, Greek freedman
- Ptolemy XI Alexander II, king (pharaoh) of Egypt
- Sang Hongyang, Chinese politician of the Han dynasty
- Shangguan Jie, Chinese politician of the Han dynasty
- Princess Eyi, Han Chinese princess

== Sources ==
- Broughton, Thomas Robert Shannon (1952). The magistrates of the Roman republic. Vol. 2. New York: American Philological Association.
