= 86 BC =

86 BC in various calendars
- Gregorian calendar: 86 BC; LXXXVI BC
- Ab urbe condita: 668
- Ancient Egypt era: XXXIII dynasty, 238
- Pharaoh: Ptolemy IX Lathyros, 3
- Ancient Greek Olympiad (summer): 173rd Olympiad, year 3
- Assyrian calendar: 4665
- Balinese saka calendar: N/A
- Bengali calendar: −679 – −678
- Berber calendar: 865
- Buddhist calendar: 459
- Burmese calendar: −723
- Byzantine calendar: 5423–5424
- Chinese calendar: 甲午年 (Wood Horse); 2612 or 2405 — to — 乙未年 (Wood Goat); 2613 or 2406
- Coptic calendar: −369 – −368
- Discordian calendar: 1081
- Ethiopian calendar: −93 – −92
- Hebrew calendar: 3675–3676
- Hindu calendars
- Vikram Samvat: −29 – −28
- Shaka Samvat: N/A
- Kali Yuga: 3015–3016
- Holocene calendar: 9915
- Iranian calendar: 707 BP – 706 BP
- Islamic calendar: 729 BH – 728 BH
- Javanese calendar: N/A
- Julian calendar: N/A
- Korean calendar: 2248
- Minguo calendar: 1997 before ROC 民前1997年
- Nanakshahi calendar: −1553
- Seleucid era: 226/227 AG
- Thai solar calendar: 457–458
- Tibetan calendar: ཤིང་ཕོ་རྟ་ལོ་ (male Wood-Horse); 41 or −340 or −1112 — to — ཤིང་མོ་ལུག་ལོ་ (female Wood-Sheep); 42 or −339 or −1111

Year 86 BC was a year of the pre-Julian Roman calendar. At the time it was known as the Year of the Consulship of Cinna and Marius/Flaccus (or, less frequently, year 668 Ab urbe condita). The denomination 86 BC for this year has been used since the early medieval period, when the Anno Domini calendar era became the prevalent method in Europe for naming years.

== Events ==
=== By place ===
==== Roman Republic ====
- First Mithridatic War
  - March 1 – Siege of Athens (87–86 BC) ends when Sulla captures Athens from the Pontic army, removing the tyrant Aristion.
  - Lucius Licinius Lucullus decisively defeats the Mithridatic fleet in the Battle of Tenedos.
  - The Roman forces of Lucius Cornelius Sulla defeat the Pontic forces of Archelaus in the Battle of Chaeronea.
  - The Dardani ally with Pontus and are defeated by Sulla soon after.

== Births ==
- October 1 – Sallust, Roman historian (d. 34 BC)
- Fausta Cornelia, twin sister of Faustus Cornelius Sulla, wife of Gaius Memmius and later of Titus Annius Milo
- Faustus Cornelius Sulla, Roman senator, son of the dictator Lucius Cornelius Sulla (d. 46 BC)

== Deaths ==
- January 13 – Gaius Marius, Roman general and politician (b. c. 157 BC)
- March 1 – Aristion, Greek philosopher and tyrant
- Jin Midi, Chinese politician and co-regent (b. 134 BC)
- Sima Qian, Chinese historian (b. 145 BC)
