= Arcathias =

Pontic prince of Persian and Greek Macedonian ancestry

Arcathias (Ancient Greek: Ἀρκαθίας) was a Pontic prince of Persian and Greek Macedonian ancestry, and figure in the First Mithridatic War. Arcathias was a son of Mithridates VI of Pontus and his sister-wife Laodice.

In 89 BC, Arcathias joined Neoptolemus and Archelaus, his father's generals, with 10,000 horses, which he brought from Armenia, at the commencement of the war with the Romans.

Arcathias took an active part in the great battle fought near the river Amneius or Amnias in Paphlagonia (the modern Gök River), in which Nicomedes IV of Bithynia was defeated. Two years afterwards, in 87 BC, he invaded Macedonia with a separate army alongside a general named Taxilas. There they either annihilated the legions of Sentius or successfully ejected them from Macedonia. By 86 BC, he had completely conquered Macedonia. He then proceeded to march against Sulla, but died on the way, at Tidaeum (or Potidaea or Mount Tisaion).

The commander of the army sent to Macedonia is called "Ariarathes" by Plutarch, but it's generally assumed that this is the same person.
