= Battle of Delos =

Battle of the First Mithridatic War, 88 BC

- Part of the First Mithridatic War
| Date | 88 BC |
| Location | Delos, Aegean Sea |
| Result | Roman victory |

Belligerents
| Roman Republic | Athens; Kingdom of Pontus |

Commanders and leaders
| Publius Orbius | Apellicon of Teos |

Strength
| Unknown | Unknown |

Casualties and losses
| Unknown | Six hundred killed, four hundred captured |

The battle of Delos took place during the First Mithridatic War in 88 BC. Initially an ally of the Roman Republic, Athens defected in favour of Mithridates, the king of Pontus. As the Athenian island of Delos had remained faithful to Rome, Athens sent an expeditionary force, which was crushed on the island's beach by a small Roman squadron.

== Background ==
In 89, the Roman general Manius Aquilius attempted an invasion of the kingdom of Pontus, located in northern Anatolia. However, the attack turned up wrong and the counter-attack of the king of Pontus, Mithridates VI Eupator, swept away the Roman forces. In a few months, Mithridates conquered the Roman province of Asia. These developments shook political life in Athens, where the peripatetic philosopher Athenion was sent at the head of an embassy to the Pontic king in 88. While in Asia, Athenion sent letters to his city promising that Mithridates would solve the current problems of Athens, principally debt, social issues (a slave revolt occurred a few years earlier), and the suspension of democracy. His return was like a triumph and he was elected hoplite general in the euphoria, with the power to appoint all the other magistrates. It seems that Athenion picked Mithridates as the eponymous archon, showing that Athens broke with Rome and was now on his side.

Delos was an island in the centre of the Aegean sea that belonged to Athens. It was the principal slave market of the ancient world, where many traders from Italy gathered. Under the Italians' influence, the island rejected the new alliance of its metropolis and entered in a rebellion.

== Battle ==
Athenion dispatched a fellow peripatetic philosopher named Apellicon of Teos at the head of an expeditionary force to quell the revolt. Apellicon is mostly known for having owned the library of Aristotle, but he had apparently no military experience. After landing on the island, the Athenians installed a camp but they did not make watchtowers or set up guards. A Roman prefect named Orbius commanding a naval squadron landed on the island and attacked the Athenian camp during the night. Taken by surprise while sleeping, most of the Athenians were killed or captured. Orbius erected a trophy on the beach and an altar celebrating his victory.

Apellicon survived and escaped to Athens, where he died in 86, as the Roman general Sulla took possession of his library after he seized Athens in 86.

== Aftermath ==
Victory was short-lived for the Romans on the island: soon after, a large Pontic army commanded by Archelaus arrived to Greece. Archelaus ordered his lieutenant, Menophanes, to take Delos. Meanwhile, Mithridates had also ordered the massacre of all the Italians that lived in Asia, an event known as the Asian vespers. Delos suffered the same fate and up to 20,000 Italians were slaughtered. Archelaus seized the treasures on the island and gave them to Aristion, an epicurean philosopher from his court. Aristion also received a force of 2,000 men and was sent to Athens, where he apparently replaced as tyrant Athenion, who is not mentioned in ancient sources again after the fiasco at Delos.
