= Siege of Athens and Piraeus (87–86 BC) =

- Part of the First Mithridatic War
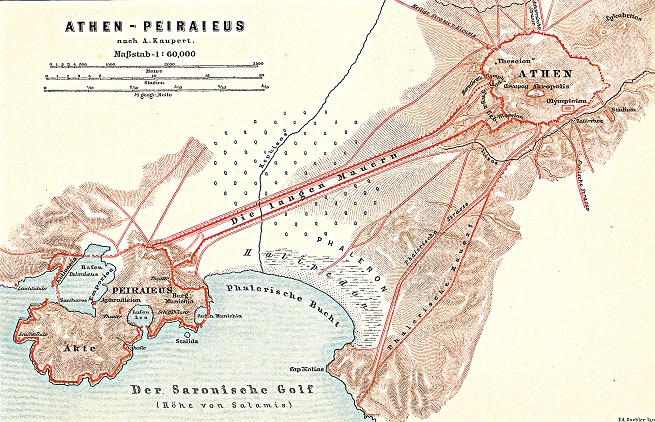
- Map of the Athenian city wall encompassing both Athens and Piraeus.
| Date | Autumn 87 BC – 1 March 86 BC (Athens), Spring 86 BC (Piraeus) |
| Location | Athens, Greece |
| Result | Roman victory |

Belligerents
| Roman Republic | Kingdom of Pontus; Athenian City-State |

Commanders and leaders
| Lucius Cornelius Sulla; Lucius Licinius Lucullus; Gaius Scribonius Curio; Lucius Licinius Murena | Commander-in-chief: Archelaus (commanding the defenders of Piraeus) ----Commanders; Aristion (in command of Athens itself) |

Strength
| Total: 37,000–44,000 5 Roman legions (17,000–24,000 legionaires); 20,000 auxiliaries | Unknown |

Casualties and losses
| Low | 400,000: 200,000 dead; 200,000 captured |

The siege of Athens and Piraeus was a siege of the First Mithridatic War that took place from autumn of 87 BC to the spring of 86 BC. The battle was fought between the forces of the Roman Republic, commanded by Lucius Cornelius Sulla Felix on the one hand, and the forces of the Kingdom of Pontus and the Athenian City-State on the other. The Greek and Pontic forces were commanded by Aristion and Archelaus.

== Historical context ==
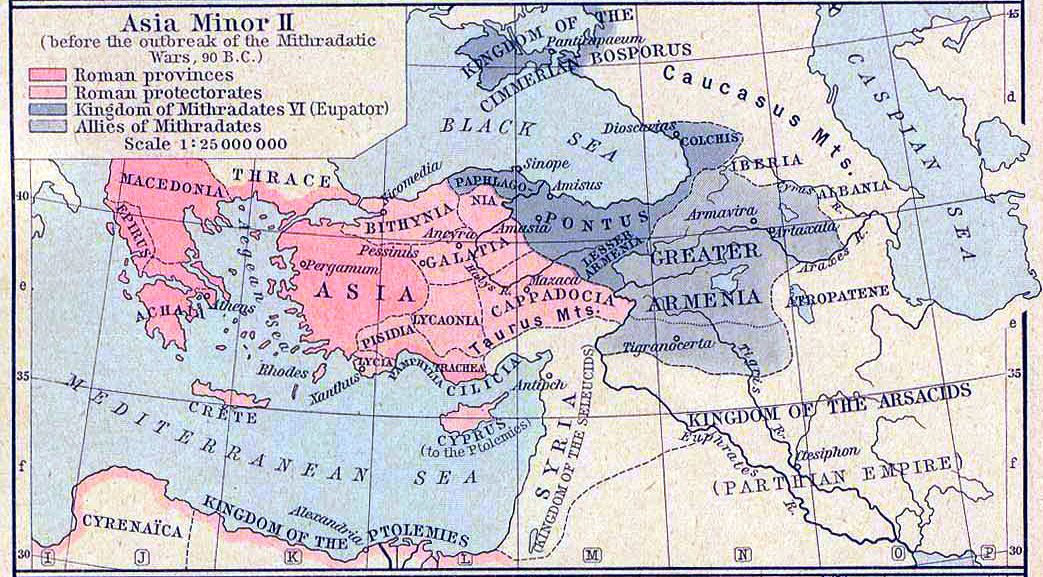
Asia Minor just before the First Mithridatic War

The invasion of Mithridates VI Eupator, king of Pontus, into the Kingdom of Bithynia, an ally of Rome, coupled with the assassination of Roman citizens in the Asiatic Vespers, caused war between Rome and Pontus. Allegedly, up to 80,000 Roman citizens were massacred. The Roman province of Asia was then occupied by the forces of Mithridates VI under the command of Archelaus and before long, Mithridates VI had won over all the Greek city-states which had previously been under Roman rule. In the spring of 87 BC Roman forces under Sulla landed at Dyrrachium, in Illyria. Sulla's first target was Athens, ruled by a Mithridatic puppet—the tyrant Aristion. Sulla moved southeast, picking up supplies and reinforcements as he went. Sulla’s chief of staff was Lucullus, who went ahead of him to scout the way and negotiate with Bruttius Sura, the existing Roman commander in Greece. After speaking with Lucullus, Sura handed over the command of his troops to Sulla. At Chaeronea, ambassadors from all the major cities of Greece (except Athens) met with Sulla, who impressed on them Rome's determination to drive Mithridates from Greece and Asia Province. Sulla then advanced on Athens.

== Siege ==
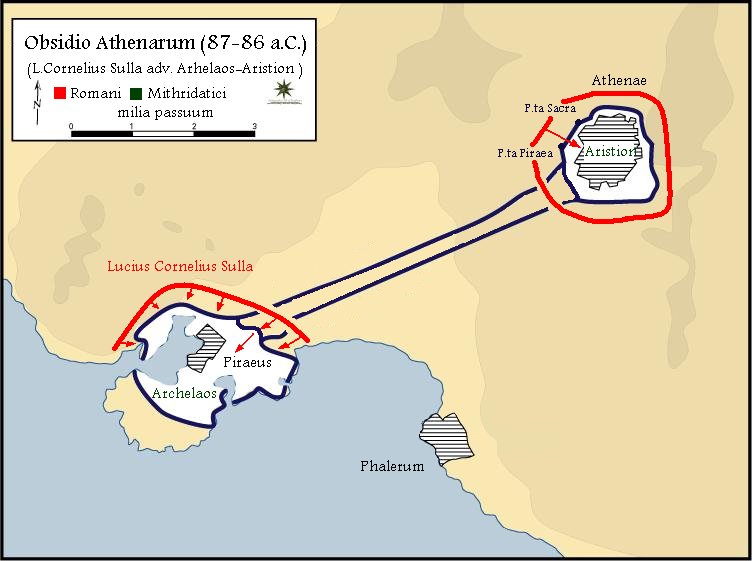
The final phase of the siege.

Sulla marched towards Athens and upon his arrival he encountered his first problem. The main outer wall that had surrounded the city, connecting the main city with its port at Piraeus, was in ruins. As a result, Sulla was forced to conduct two separate sieges, throwing up siege works surrounding both Athens and its port Piraeus. A force commanded by Archelaus defended Piraeus whilst another commanded by Aristion took up the main defense of Athens. The sea defense was considerably easier as a Pontic fleet dominated the nearby sea, facilitating reinforcement and replenishment whenever necessary. Furthermore, Piraeus already had ample supplies from the onset while Athens did not.

Sulla decided to first concentrate his attacks on Piraeus, seeing as without its port, there was no way that Athens could be resupplied. He sent Lucius Licinius Lucullus to raise a fleet from the remaining Roman allies in the eastern Mediterranean to deal with the Pontic navy. The first attack on the city was entirely repulsed, so Sulla decided to build huge earthworks. Wood was also needed, so he cut down everything, including the sacred groves of Greece, up to 100 miles from Athens' main town. When more money was needed he “borrowed” from temples and Sibyls alike. The currency minted from this treasure was to remain in circulation for centuries and prized for its quality. Siege works were built to facilitate the next attack which was eventually successful in taking the outer wall of Piraeus.

Once the outer wall was taken, Sulla discovered that Archelaus had built more walls inside the city. Despite the complete encirclement of Athens and its port, and several attempts by Archelaus to raise the siege, a stalemate developed. Roman attention was temporarily shifted towards Athens, which was starving. Inside the city, the population was reduced to eating shoe leather and grass. A delegation from Athens was sent to treat with Sulla, but instead of serious negotiations they expounded on the glory of their city. Sulla sent them away saying: “I was sent to Athens, not to take lessons, but to reduce rebels to obedience.”

Soon Sulla's camp was to fill with refugees from Rome, fleeing the massacres of Marius and Cinna. These also included his wife and children, as well as those of the Optimate party who had not been killed. With his political enemies having taken power in Rome, Sulla realized that the money and reinforcements he believed were coming to bolster his forces could no longer be counted on. Thus, Sulla ordered the sacking of every temple and religious site in the vicinity. The chronicles state that one of the people sent on such a sacking mission became afraid due to ominous voices having been heard upon entering the temple. Deciding not to continue sacking the temple, the soldier returned to Sulla, who ordered him back, stating that he had heard laughter because the gods would be pleased with his victory.

With Athens on the verge of starvation, Aristion grew less popular by the day. Greek deserters informed Sulla that Aristion was neglecting the Heptachalcum (part of the city wall). Sulla immediately sent sappers to undermine the wall. Nine hundred feet of wall was brought down between the Sacred and Piraeic gates on the southwest side of the city.

On 1 March 86 BC, after five months under siege, a midnight sack of Athens began. After Aristion's taunts, Sulla was not in a mood to be magnanimous. Blood was said to have literally flowed in the streets, it was only after the entreaties of a couple of his Greek friends (Midias and Calliphon) and the pleas of the Roman Senators in his camp that Sulla decided enough was enough. After setting fire to large portions of the city, Aristion and his forces fled to the Acropolis, where they had gathered a store of supplies over the preceding few weeks.

At the same time, Archelaus abandoned the city of Piraeus and concentrated his forces in the city's citadel. Sulla, in a bid to stop an escape by Archelaus, who would surely join his reinforcement army sent by Mithridates VI elsewhere in Greece, left the taking of the Acropolis to Gaius Scribonius Curio Burbulieus. In any case, Sulla, not having a navy, was powerless to stop the escape of Archelaus, who was able to rejoin his relief army. Sulla then advanced into Boeotia to take on Archelaus's armies and remove them from Greece. Before leaving the area however, he burnt the city of Piraeus to the ground.

While Aristion and his party were able to stave off the Roman attackers for some time, they eventually surrendered after their water ran out and they had heard of the Pontic defeat at the Battle of Chaeronea. They were all executed shortly after their surrender.

== Consequences ==
After routing the Pontic army at the Battle of Chaeronea, Sulla had another victory at the Battle of Orchomenus the following year. Sulla and Mithridates VI of Pontus finally got together in 85 BC to sign the Treaty of Dardanos, concluding the First Mithridatic War.

Sulla's army took Athens on the Kalends of March, in the consulate of Marius and Cinna, February 12 86 BC. The siege of Athens was a long and brutal campaign, Sulla's rough battle hardened legions, veterans of the Social War, are said to have thoroughly devastated the city. However, archaeological investigations show that the destruction wrought on the city by Sulla's troops was less devastating than has generally been assumed in research.

== See also ==
- First Mithridatic War
- Lucius Cornelius Sulla Felix

== Bibliography ==
=== Ancient sources ===
- Appian (1995). Lendering, Jona (ed.). Appian, The Mithridatic Wars. Translated by White, Horace. Livius.org. Archived from the original on 2015-11-16.
- Florus (2018). Thayer, William (ed.). Florus: Epitome of Roman History. Translated by Forster, E.S. penelope.uchicago.edu.
- Livy (2014). The History of Rome. Translated by Baker, George. University of Adelaide. Archived from the original on 2019-08-10.
- Plutarch (2012). Thayer, William (ed.). The Life of Sulla. Translated by Perrin, Bernadotte. penelope.uchicago.edu.
- Velleius (2018). Thayer, William (ed.). Velleius Paterculus: The Roman History. Translated by Shipley, Frederick W. penelope.uchicago.edu.

=== Modern sources ===
- Antonelli, Giuseppe (1992). Mitridate, il nemico mortale di Roma (in Italian). in Il Giornale - Biblioteca storica. Milan. p. 49.
- Brizzi, Giovanni [in Italian] (1997). Storia di Roma. 1. Dalle origini ad Azio (in Italian). Bologna.
- Dowling, M.B. (2000). "The Clemency of Sulla". Historia: Zeitschrift für Alte Geschichte. 49 (3): 303–340.
- Eckert, Alexandra (2016). Lucius Cornelius Sulla in der antiken Erinnerung. Jener Mörder, der sich Felix nannte [Lucius Cornelius Sulla in ancient memory. That murderer who called himself Felix]. Berlin/New York. ISBN 978-3-11-044981-5.
- Hoff, M.C. (1997). "Laceratae Athenae. Sulla's Siege of Athens in 87/6 B.C. and its Aftermath". In Hoff, M.C.; Rotroff, S.I. (eds.). The Romanization of Athens. Oxford. pp. 33–51.
- Kuin, Inger N.I. (2018). "Sulla and the Invention of Roman Athens". Mnemosyne. 71 (4): 616–639. doi:10.1163/1568525X-12342370. hdl:11370/7a79d010-850d-4aae-bafa-8ad26b07a939. S2CID 165670272.
- Parigi, Caterina (2019). "Athen und die Plünderung durch Sulla: Archäologische und topographische Überlegungen" [Athens and the sack by Sulla: Archaeological and topographical considerations]. In Fouquet, Johannes; Herzog, Sarah; Meese, Karin; Wittenberg, Tim (eds.). Argonautica. Festschrift für Reinhard Stupperich. Marsberg/Padberg: Scriptorium. pp. 158–174. ISBN 978-3-932610-60-8.
- Piganiol, André (1927). La conquête romaine (in French).
- Ruggeri, C. (2006). "Silla e la conquista di Atene nell' 86 a.C.". In Amann, P.; Pedrazzi, M.; Taeuber, H. (eds.). Italo-Tusco-Romana. Festschrift für Luciana Aigner-Foresti zum 70. Geburtstag am 30. Juli 2006. Vienna. pp. 315–324.
- Santangelo, F. (2007). Sulla, the Elites and the Empire. A Study of Roman Policies in Italy and the Greek East. Leiden.
- Thein, A. (2014). "Reflecting on Sulla's Clemency". Historia: Zeitschrift für Alte Geschichte. 63 (2): 166–186. doi:10.25162/historia-2014-0009. S2CID 159609145.
