= Lucius Licinius Murena (praetor 88 BC) =

Roman general and politician

Lucius Murena
- Born: c. 110 BC
- Died: c. 80 BC (aged 30)
- Allegiance: Rome
- Service years: 87 - 82 BC
- Conflicts: First Mithridatic War Siege of Athens and Piraeus Fourth Battle of Chaeronea Second Mithridatic War Battle of Halys
- Children: Lucius

Lucius Licinius Murena was a Roman soldier and politician. He was notable for playing an important role in the Roman victory against the forces of Mithridates VI of Pontus at the Battle of Chaeronea in 86 BC during the First Mithridatic War and for starting another war, the Second Mithridatic War (83–81 BC), against Mithridates in Asia Minor without the authorisation of the Roman Senate.

== Life ==
Murena was a praetor probably in 88 BC. He was a lieutenant of Lucius Cornelius Sulla during the First Mithridatic War (89–85 BC) with Mithridates VI of Pontus. He participated in the Battle of Chaeronea of 86 BC. Sulla encamped near Chaeronea, close to the camp of Archelaus, the commander of the enemy. He left Murena behind with one legion and two cohorts to face the enemy, should they prepare for battle, and went to Chaeronea, where the Romans had a garrison. Some of the townsfolk offered to go and cut off the enemy at nearby Thurium. Sulla agreed, returned to his camp and prepared for battle, putting Murena in charge of the left wing. The Chaeroneans were routed and Murena received some of the fugitives. During the battle Murena was attacked and Sulla sent four cohorts to help him. Later in the battle he set out to help him himself. However, Murena had already gained the upper hand and Sulla joined him in the pursuit of the fugitives.

In a note on Lucius Licinius Lucullus, Pseudo-Aurelius Victor wrote that he gained the fleet of Mithridates and king Ptolemy of Egypt for Sulla through Murena. Presumably the Ptolemy in question was Ptolemy IX.

At the end of that war, Sulla left Murena in Asia Minor as a legatus to watch over the region. He was put in charge of the Valerian legions, two legions formerly controlled by Gaius Flavius Fimbria. We can deduce from Appian's account of this war in his The Mithridatic Wars, that Murena had been given the command of Phrygia, which had been annexed to the Attalid kingdom in 188 BC, Galatia, a client state of Rome, and Cappadocia, which was a Roman ally. Under the terms of the Treaty of Dardanos, Sulla had left Mithridates in control of his Pontus. Murena undertook an unauthorised war against Mithridates, the Second Mithridatic War (83–81 BC).

In 83 BC, Murena attacked Comana, a town which belonged to Mithridates, because of suspicions that the latter was preparing for war against the Romans. Mithridates was fitting a fleet and raising an army to deal with a rebellion by the Colchians and the tribes around the Cimmerian Bosphorus. It was the scale of these preparations and the fact that he had not restored the entirety of Cappadocia to its king, Ariobarzanes I, who was a Roman ally, which led to this impression. Mithridates sent envoys to invoke the peace treaty. Murena replied that he did not see any treaties because Sulla had not written it down before he returned to Greece. Murena then began looting and then returned to Cappadocia to winter there.

Mithridates sent envoys to Rome to complain. In 82 BC, Murena seized 400 villages which belonged to Mithridates, who chose to wait for the return of the ambassadors, rather than retaliate. Murena returned to Phrygia and Galatia loaded with the plunder. He was reached by, Calidius, a messenger of the senate who ordered him to stop the hostilities because Mithridates had not broken the peace treaty. Murena ignored this and invaded Mithridates’ territory. The latter thought that this was done under the order of Rome and retaliated. Roman villages were attacked and loot was taken. Murena was then defeated by Mithridates in battle near the River Halys and fled to Phrygia. Mithridates drove all the Roman garrisons out of Cappadocia. Aulus Gabinius was sent to reinforce the order to stop fighting and to meet Mithridates and Ariobarzanes I to reconcile them. Murena was recalled to Rome.

Murena was awarded a triumph for a victory over king Mithridates in 81 BC. His son, also called Lucius Licinius Murena, became consul in 62 BC.
