= Battle of Mount Scorobas =

Battle in 88 BC

- Part of the First Mithridatic War
Date	88 BC
Location	Mount Scorobas, in modern Turkey 41°07′00″N 30°38′00″E
Result	Pontic victory

Belligerents
Pontus	Roman Republic

Commanders and leaders
Archelaus	Manius Aquilius
- Location within Turkey Battle of Mount Scorobas (Black Sea)

The Battle of Mount Scorobas was fought in 88 BC between the Roman Republic and Pontus during the First Mithridatic War. The Romans were led by Manius Aquilius, while the Mithridatic forces were led by Archelaus. Pontus was victorious.

After the battle, Aquillius fled and attempted to make his way back to Italy. At Lesbos he was captured and delivered to Mithridates. After being taken to the mainland, Aquillius was then placed on a donkey and paraded back to Pergamon. Aquillius was then moved to and executed at the Theater of Dionysus, which sits on a hill of the Acropolis. A large bonfire was made in the center of the theater. Aquillius was dragged behind a horse, which was ridden by a soldier, and dragged around the bonfire, as gold coins were melted down in crucibles. Aquillius was then held down and the molten hot gold was poured down his throat for an agonizing death.

== Bibliography ==
- Titus Livius (Livy), History of Rome.
- Marcus Tullius Cicero, Pro Lege Manilia.
- Marcus Velleius Paterculus, Roman History.
- Appianus Alexandrinus (Appian), Bella Mithridatica (The Mithridatic Wars).
- Athenaeus, Deipnosophistae (The Banquet of the Learned).
- Dictionary of Greek and Roman Biography and Mythology, William Smith, ed., Little, Brown and Company, Boston (1849).
- August Pauly, Georg Wissowa, et alii, Realencyclopädie der Classischen Altertumswissenschaft (Scientific Encyclopedia of the Knowledge of Classical Antiquities, abbreviated PW), J. B. Metzler, Stuttgart (1894–1980).
- T. Robert S. Broughton, The Magistrates of the Roman Republic, American Philological Association (1952–1986).
