= Battle of Halys =

82 BC battle of the Second Mithridatic War

- Part of the Second Mithridatic War
Date	82 BC
Location	Halys River, Kingdom of Pontus (modern-day Kızılırmak River, Turkey)
Result	Pontic victory

Belligerents
Roman Republic	Pontus

Commanders and leaders
Lucius Licinius Murena	Mithridates VI of Pontus; Gordius

Strength
2 Roman legions	Unknown

Casualties and losses
Unknown	Unknown

The Battle of Halys (also known as the Battle of Halys River) took place in 82 BC, during the Second Mithridatic War. Roman general Lucius Licinius Murena became very overconfident while campaigning against Pontus and ignored orders to cease operations there. He commanded two legions (the infamous Fimbrians). Murena launched two raids into Pontic territory. After receiving orders from the Senate not to continue the war, Murena launched a third raid, beginning the Second Mithridatic War. At Halys River, the Romans spared a small Pontic army under general Gordius for too long. Gordius waited until King Mithradates VI arrived himself with the main Pontic army. The Romans were very ill-prepared for the battle. The combined Pontic army attacked the Roman forces on the opposite side of the river. The Mithridatic troops eventually forced their way across, forcing the Romans to retreat. Eventually in 81 BC Lucius Cornelius Sulla restored peace between Rome and Pontus.
