= Treaty of Dardanos =

85 BC treaty between Sulla and Mithridates of Pontus

The Treaty of Dardanos (85 BC) was a treaty between Rome and Pontus signed between Lucius Cornelius Sulla of Rome and King Mithridates VI of Pontus. It ended the First Mithridatic War.

== Defeat of Mithridates ==
Due the victories over Mithridates by Sulla in the Battle of Chaeronea and the Battle of Orchomenus, and re-establishing control over the Greek islands following the Battle of Tenedos, Sulla demanded terms of surrender from Mithridates. Negotiations over the final terms of surrender were held at the ruined city of Dardanus.

The treaty required Mithridates to surrender his newly conquered territories on the Greek mainland and islands, as well as the provinces of Bithynia, Phrygia, Paphlagonia, and Cappadocia. Mithridates also had to pay two thousand talents from his personal wealth, and the provinces which Mithridates surrendered were required to pay an additional twenty thousand talents (equivalent to the export production for two decades).

== The Treaty of Dardanos ==
"The concluding Treaty of Dardanos in 85 BC was built around a return to the status quo, as it had existed before the war. This meant that Greece belonged to Rome and the rebellious cities such as Athens were forced to pay huge indemnities, which accompanied the losses of any residual liberties that they had once possessed."

== See also ==
- List of treaties
