= Neoptolemus (Pontic army officer) =

Pontic army officer

Neoptolemus (Greek: Νεοπτόλεμος, flourished second half of 2nd century BC and first half of 1st century BC, died by 63 BC) was a distinguished general of King Mithridates VI of Pontus. He was the brother of Archelaus, another general of Mithridates VI and the paternal uncle of Archelaus’ sons: Archelaus and Diogenes.

Like his brother Archelaus, Neoptolemus was a Cappadocian Greek nobleman, possibly of Macedonian descent from unknown parents. He perhaps descended from Greeks who arrived in Anatolia after the expedition of King Alexander the Great. Neoptolemus's family were active in the Pontic Court. Like his brother, Neoptolemus was a general and admiral in the First Mithridatic War (89 BC-85 BC). Prior to the First Mithridatic War, Neoptolemus and his brother had gained military experience in the Pontic campaigns on the northern shores of the Black Sea. He took part in campaigns as far as the mainland west of the Crimea, reaching possibly as far west as Tyras, where he erected a fortress which continues to bear his name. Also in the Crimea, in the Sea of Azov, he fought two battles on the Palus Maeotis in two years.

In 88 BC, as a part of the First Mithridatic War, Neoptolemus and his brother were involved in a military campaign with the Pontic army against King Nicomedes IV of Bithynia. At the Amnias River the brothers commanded the advance guard and won their first victory of the war. Neoptolemus then went on to defeat a Roman-led army at Protopachium, probably without his brother. The Roman army led by Manius Aquillius was forced to retreat to Pergamon. With these two victories Mithridates VI was able to extend his control of the Roman Province of Asia, and his generals took the war to Greece.

Neoptolemus accompanied his brother and the Pontic army to Athens. He commanded the Pontic forces around Chalcis, where he suffered defeat from the Roman Munatius, losing 1,500 men. After the Pontic army left Greece in 85 BC, Mithridates VI put Neoptolemus in command of the Pontic fleet guarding the Hellespont. Neoptolemus engaged the Roman fleet led by Lucius Licinius Lucullus at the island of Tenedos (see: battle of Tenedos). Mithridates, losing battle after battle, was forced to end the war with the Roman Dictator Lucius Cornelius Sulla. After this, nothing further is known of Neoptolemus.

== Sources ==
- Article title
- Article title
- http://www.historyofwar.org/articles/people_archelaus.html
- http://www.historyofwar.org/articles/people_neoptolemus.html
- D. Dueck, H. Lindsay and S. Pothecary, Strabo’s cultural geography: the making of a kolossourgia, Cambridge University Press, 2005
