= Taxiles (Pontic army officer) =

General of the Pontic Army (1st century BC)

Taxiles (Ancient Greek: Ταξίλης; fl. 86–69 BC) was a general in the service of Mithridates VI of Pontus, and one of those in whom he reposed the highest confidence. He is first mentioned in 86 BC, when he was sent by Mithridates, with an army of not less than 110,000 men, to make his way through Thrace and Macedonia to provide support to Archelaus in Greece. This task he successfully accomplished. He reduced Amphipolis, which had at first defied his arms, and having thus struck terror into the Macedonians, advanced, without further opposition, through that country and Thessaly into Phocis. Here he at first laid siege to Elateia, but was foiled in his attacks, and relinquished the enterprise, in order to meet up with Archelaus in Boeotia. The two Pontic generals now found themselves at the head of a formidable host, but their combined forces were defeated in 86 BC by Sulla near Chaeronea, with great slaughter.

From this time no more is heard of Taxiles until 74 BC when he commanded (together with Hermocrates) the great army with which Mithridates invaded Paphlagonia and Bithynia in the autumn of that year. During the subsequent operations at the siege of Cyzicus, he is mentioned as giving the king the most judicious advice. After the defeat of the king and his retreat into his own territories, Taxiles shared with Diophantus the command of the army which Mithridates sent to oppose Lucullus near Cabira, 72 BC, where their skilful arrangements for a time held the balance of success doubtful, and reduced the Roman general to considerable straits for provisions. At length, however, the campaign was terminated by a total rout, in which the Pontic camp fell into the hands of the enemy.

Taxiles accompanied Mithridates on his flight into Armenia, and subsequently (69 BC) he is mentioned as present with Tigranes at the great Battle of Tigranocerta, on which occasion he, in vain, endeavoured to restrain the overweening confidence of the Armenian monarch. This is the last time that his name occurs in history.
