= Aulus Braetius Sura =

Roman army officer

Aulus Braetius Sura (also Quintus Braitius Sura or Bruttius) was a Roman commander during the First Mithridatic War. He was the first Roman commander to successfully resist Mithridates' advance.

Honorific inscription at Larissa

Rubbing in majuscules:
: ΘΑΜΑΝΩΝΚΟΙΝΤΟΝΒΡΑΙΤΙΟ
ΙΟΝΣΟΥΡΑΝΠΡΕΣΒΕΥΤΗΝ
ΥΕΡΓΕΤΗΝ

Modernization with reconstruction:
[τὸ κοινὸν τῶν Ἀ]θαμάνων Κόϊντον Βραίτιο[ν]
[— — — — — — — ὑ]ιὸν Σούραν πρεσβευτὴν
[τὸν ἑαυτοῦ σωτῆρα καὶ ε]ὐεργέτην.

Translation:
The Koinon of Athamanes honours Q. Brutius Sura ... presbeutes.

An inscription from Larissa in Thessaly honors Q. Braetius Sura and is the only source stating his full name.

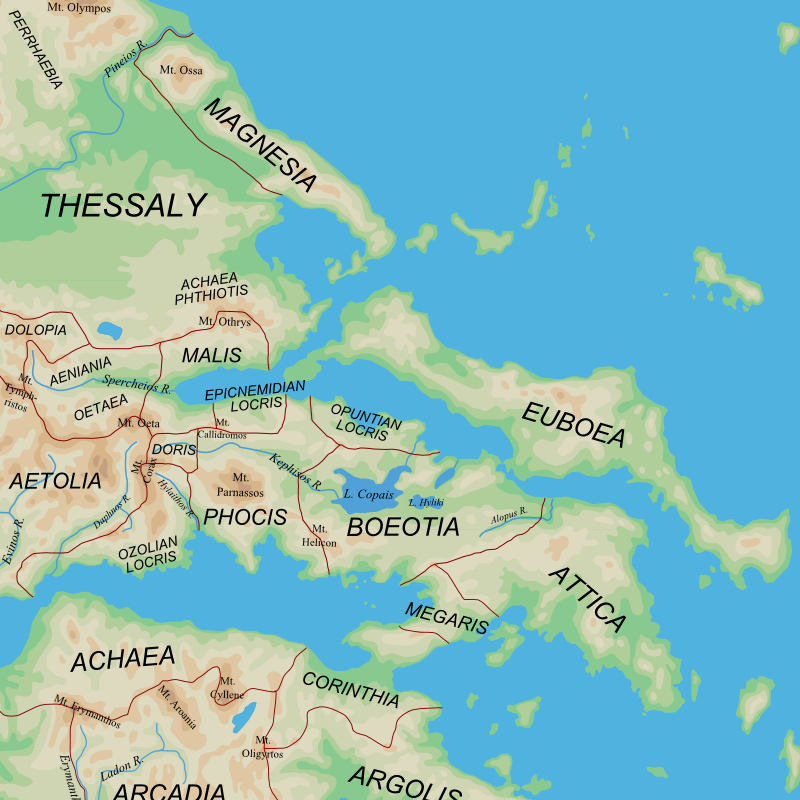
Map showing ancient regions of central Greece in relation to geographical features

During the war, he was a legate to propraetor Gaius Sentius, the Roman governor of Macedonia. In 88 BC, Sura and a small detachment from Sentius's army were sent south to stop Archelaus, a leading general of King Mithridates of Pontus, who had invaded Greece. Sura started with a naval engagement in which he was victorious, then captured the island of Sciathos, which the Mithridatics were using as a storehouse. He crucified all escaped slaves on the island, and brutally cut off the hands of the free men. After receiving reinforcements, he pushed further south into Boeotia. Archelaus and his Greek allies moved against him. Sura took care not to become fully committed and to keep his lines of retreat open, engaging in battle with the opposition in at least three encounters in the course of three days. In early 87 BC, Lucullus, a lieutenant of the proconsul Lucius Cornelius Sulla, arrived and ordered Sura and his forces back to Macedonia. Sura was the first Roman commander to stop the Mithridatic onslaught, he proved to the Greeks that Rome was not easily defeated and he blocked Archelaus' advance into Northern Greece. By his actions he contained the Mithridatic invasion and paved the way for a Roman counter-offensive which would duly arrive in the form of Lucius Cornelius Sulla at the head of five full legions of battle-hardened legionaries, veterans from the war with the Italian allies.

== Bibliography ==
- Broughton, Thomas Robert Shannon (1952). The magistrates of the Roman republic. Vol. 2. New York: American Philological Association.
- Broughton, Thomas Robert Shannon (1986). The magistrates of the Roman republic. Vol. 3. Atlanta, GA: Scholars Press.
