= First Mithridatic War =

War between Rome and Pontus, 89–85 BC

- Part of the Mithridatic Wars and Sulla's civil war
- The Near East at the beginning of the war
Date	late summer 89–85 BC
Location	Asia, Ancient Greece
Result	Roman victory
Territorial changes	Return to status quo ante bellum (treaty of Dardanus)

Belligerents
Roman Republic; Bithynia; Rhodes	Roman rebels	Pontus; Athens; Armenia

Commanders and leaders
Mn. Aquillius X; L. Valerius Flaccus X; C. Flavius Fimbria; Nikomedes; Braetius Sura	Sulla; Lucullus	Mithridates VI; Archelaus; Neoptolemos; Aristion X

Strength
in 89: 56,000 Bithynians; 40,000 Romans and allies; 2 legions in 86	5 legions in 87; 7 legions after 85	250,000

Casualties and losses
100,000 Italian civilians (exaggerated)	Unknown	c. 350,000 killed, including civilians (Roman estimate); c. 200,000+ captured or enslaved (Roman estimate)

The First Mithridatic War (89–85 BC) was a large conflict in Anatolia and ancient Greece in opposition to the Roman Republic by the Pontic kingdom ruled by Mithridates VI Eupator. Although the Roman general Sulla was largely victorious on the battlefield, factional struggle in Rome forced him to end the war on a precarious stalemate.

The war began after more than a decade of geopolitical manoeuvring by Mithridates, who managed to considerably extend his realm despite constant Roman attempts to restrain him. In 90 BC, a Roman delegation headed by Manius Aquillius provoked Mithridates into war, as Aquillius hoped to receive its command. The following year, Mithridates rapidly captured the Roman province of Asia, exploiting local resentment of Roman tax collectors to massacre the Roman settlers. Taken by surprise while it was fighting a large revolt of its allies in Italy, Rome was initially unable to respond. This allowed Mithridates to encourage more defections from Greek cities, most notably Athens, where he installed the tyrant Aristion.

In Rome, the attribution of the command of the Mithridatic War led to civil strife, which was won by Sulla after he made a coup by marching his army on the city in 88 BC. However, once Sulla left Italy, his enemies Marius and Cinna seized power and declared him a public enemy. As a result, Sulla waged the war on his own as a rogue general. His campaign was swift: in 86 BC, he took Athens, then crushed Mithridates' general Archelaus in central Greece at the battles of Chaeronea and Orchomenos. Meanwhile, the official Roman government dispatched its own army to fight Mithridates, led by Lucius Valerius Flaccus, who was murdered by his lieutenant Fimbria. The latter then crossed into Asia and successfully conducted his own campaign against Mithridates.

At this point, Sulla realised that Fimbria could rob him of his victory, so he offered a generous peace to Mithridates called the treaty of Dardanos, restoring the situation to its pre-89 BC state. Soon after, Sulla convinced Fimbria's soldiers to defect and forced him to commit suicide, thus removing the last threat to his private empire in the East. In 83 BC, Sulla left Greece to fight the Cinno-Marians, against whom he won a civil war, which enabled his rule as dictator in Rome. However, Sulla's settlement of the East was short-lived; hostilities rapidly resumed in the Second Mithridatic War (83–81 BC), fought on the Roman side by Murena, the lieutenant that Sulla had left behind in Asia.

== Sources ==
No contemporary account of Mithridates has survived. Modern historians have to use fragmentary or summarised versions of lost works, or histories written much later, none favourable to Mithridates. The most important source is the Roman history of Appian of Alexandria, a Greek author of the 2nd century AD, who is nevertheless not a good historian, prone to mistakes.

Another significant source is Plutarch, who wrote in the early 2nd century AD a set of famous biographies known as the Parallel Lives, which includes the lives of Roman commanders who played a role during the wars against Mithridates, most importantly Sulla, and also Marius, Lucullus, Sertorius, and Pompey. Plutarch provides excellent descriptions of Sulla's campaign in central Greece, as he was born in Chaeronea, where a major battle took place. The Greek geographer Strabo was born in Pontus in the 1st century and his family even served at the royal court, but his historical works are lost; he still often mentions Mithridates in his Geographica. Other important mentions are also found in the letters and speeches of Cicero, a contemporary of the events. The fragments of the Greek philosopher Posidonius are useful for the history of Athens during this period. Finally, some scraps of information can be retrieved from the later works of Justin, Frontinus, and the De viris illustribus.

The major problem with most of these written sources is that they often derive from the lost Memoirs of Sulla—a key player of these events—who considerably arranged the facts to suit his propaganda, both against Mithridates and his rivals in Rome. He typically defamed his enemies, such as Fimbria, who is described in very unfavourable terms in all the sources, as they follow Sulla.

The Greek historian Memnon wrote a history of his city Heraclea Pontica (near modern Zonguldak in Turkey), where some action took place, which is likewise only available in fragments, but they show that Memnon did not use Roman sources and recounted events of the war differently from Appian.

Numismatics is another important source for the period, since Mithridates' coinage was extensive throughout his empire, as well as epigraphy, with many cities of the area inscribed treaties and statutes on stone. However, archaeology of northern Turkey has been poor apart from the excavations of the royal tombs in Amaseia. Mithridates also left monuments and inscriptions, such as the heroon he dedicated in Delos. Many statues and bust have been ascribed to him, but their attribution is often disputed among modern scholars; only one head is unanimously recognised as his, which is now in the Louvre Museum.

== Origins of the war ==
=== Pontic expansion ===
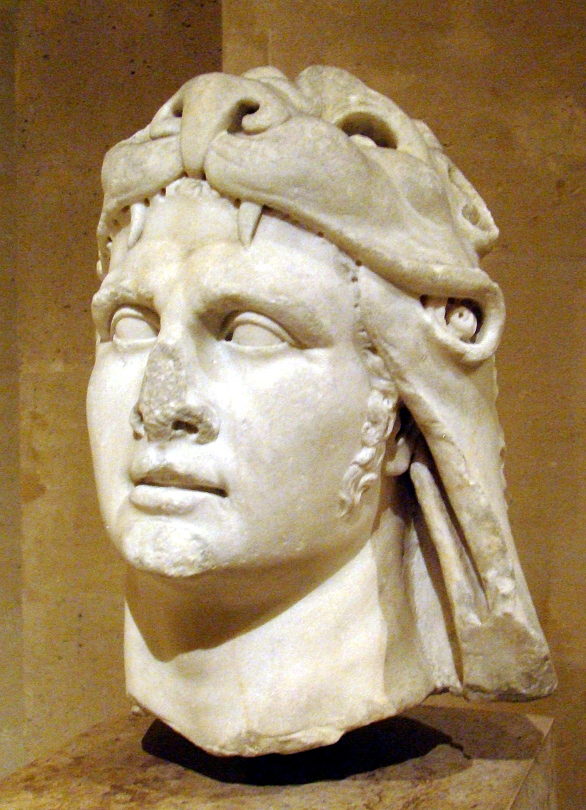
Bust of Mithridates, now in the Louvre.

Rome entered for good in Asia Minor in 133, when the last king of Pergamon, Attalus III, bequeathed his kingdom to the Republic. The province of Asia was created in its place in 129, which put the Roman borders close to several kingdoms located in the area. The largest of those was that of Pontus, ruled by the Mithridatids, a dynasty of Persian origin, claiming descent from Darius the Great. Their control of the Greek city-states of the northern coast of Anatolia added a significant Hellenistic touch to the kingdom.

Mithridates VI Eupator became king c. 120 at 13. At his majority, he started an expansionist policy towards the coast of the Black Sea and the interior of Asia minor. In 107 he obtained Lesser Armenia and Colchis, an area rich in timber used for building ships, but the details of these acquisitions are unknown. He provided military assistance against the Scythians to the Greek cities of the Black Sea, such as Apollonia Pontica, Olbia, Odessus, and Tyras, which made alliances with him. After he was bequeathed the Bosporan Kingdom (in modern Crimea), Mithridates controlled all the eastern shore of the Black Sea by the end of the 2nd century. Mithridates also expanded into Asia Minor, thanks to his alliance with Nicomedes III of Bithynia. The two kings first invaded Paphlagonia in 108–107 and shared the land between them. The same year, Mithridates occupied a part of Galatia, the area in central Anatolia populated by three Celtic tribes. He also murdered the king of Cappadocia c.100 and placed his son on its throne, but this time Rome reacted and forced Mithridates and Nicomedes III to release Paphlagonia and Cappadocia, on which throne Ariobarzanes was placed.

After this setback, Mithridates turned to his eastern neighbour Armenia, where a new king ascended to the throne in 95: Tigranes II, to whom he gave his daughter Cleopatra in marriage. In exchange, in 92, Tigranes II invaded Cappadocia, expelled Ariobarzanes, and gave the land to Mithridates. This new aggression prompted Rome to intervene again; as propraetor, Lucius Cornelius Sulla was sent there and engaged Cappadocian troops led by the Pontic general Archelaus. At the same time, Mithridates took possession of Bithynia by expelling his nephew Nicomedes IV—the son of his former ally—, then removed Ariobarzanes from Cappadocia a second time after Sulla had left. The Social War that had started between Rome and its former Italian allies in 91 emboldened Mithridates to conquer his neighbours, defying Roman orders.

=== Aquillius' embassy (90–89 BC) ===
At the end of 90, after hearing the complaints of the kings in exile Ariobarzanes and Nicomedes IV, the senate sent a new embassy, headed by Manius Aquillius, a former consul, the son of the homonymous consul of 129 that had won the war against Aristonicus. Aquillius and Manlius Mancinus, another ambassador, were notably Gaius Marius' friends. After having restored the two kings without a fight, the embassy requested that they attack Pontus; deep in debts with Rome, Nicomedes complied and ravaged Pontus up to Amastris to recover his wealth. Mithridates did not oppose him, but still started recruiting soldiers from the Black Sea area. The king wanted to gain time and sent his ambassador Pelopidas to last chance negotiations with Aquillius in Pergamon, which took place in the spring of 89. These negotiations were marred with sophistry and spurious agreements; Mithridates listed his claims over Cappadocia and Bithynia and presented himself as a victim of Nicomedes' pillage, while the latter detailed how Mithridates breached the treaties and prepared for war. In a second meeting several weeks later, as Aquillius had already sided with Nicomedes, Pelopidas accused him of acting for his own benefit and threatened to go directly before the senate, which angered the commissioners and ended the talks, making war inevitable.

Aquillius wished the negotiations to fail, by compelling Pelopidas to leave the talks twice. His intentions were likely to force a war to which he would have been appointed commander. Although Mitridates' aggressive expansion was a major factor, modern historians put most of the immediate responsibility of the war on Aquillius, who "act[ed] out of greed and personal ambition", against the will of the senate. T. J. Luce suggested that Aquillius was working on the behalf of his friend Gaius Marius, who was eyeing a comeback at the centre of Roman politics by getting the command of the war against Mithridates. Marius had conspicuously made a private trip in the area in 98, during which he met Mithridates.

A minority opinion on the origins of the war is given by Kallet-Marx, who thinks that the blame placed on Aquillius found in the work of Appian initially came from the lost Memoirs of Rutilius Rufus, a former consul who was forced into exile in Mytilene after he confronted some publican friends of Marius in Asia. Kallet-Marx instead thinks that the commissioners only wanted to restore the two kings and were taken by surprise by Mithridates’ reaction into a full-scale war.

== Phase 1: Mithridates' conquest of Asia and Greece (89–88 BC) ==
=== Failure of Nikomedes' offensive ===
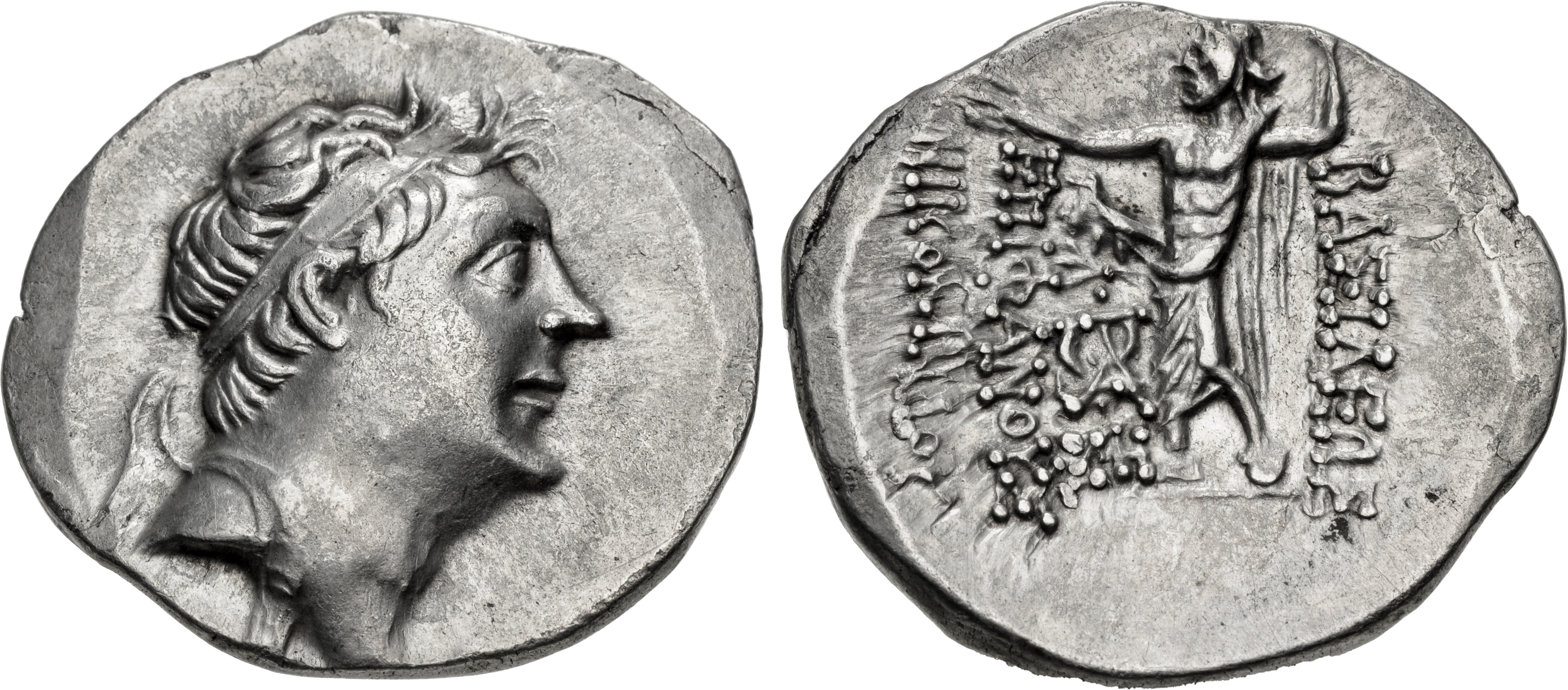
Tetradrachm of Nikomedes IV, minted in 91–90 BC.

War began in the late summer of 89. Rome adopted a defensive position, by blocking the roads in order to prevent Mithridates from leaving Pontus: Aquillius was in Paphlagonia, on the main road to Pontus; the proconsul of Asia Gaius Cassius was at the border between Bithynia and Galatia, to the northeast of Ancyra (modern Ankara); the praetor Quintus Oppius guarded Lycaonia, on the road to the Euphrates river. The Roman navy commanded by Minucius Felix and Popilius Laenas also blockaded the Bosporan straits with their navy. There was no Roman legion in Asia, only local levies.

According to Appian, Mithridates could rely on a massive army of 240,000 men, 40,000 horsemen. Rome had less than half that number, although Nikomedes could provide 50,000 men and 6,000 cavalry. Army numbers are nevertheless suspicious as ancient authors have the tendency to exaggerate the number of troops engaged, especially when describing Roman enemies. Mithridates’ number of ships is more reliable. He had a navy of 300 cataphracts (decked ships) and 100 dikrotai (ships with two banks of oars), which gave him "immense naval superiority" throughout the war.

While Rome was on a defensive stance, the attacking role was given to Nikomedes. The king of Bithynia personally led all his troops, which outnumbered the Pontic army in the area, commanded by the brothers Archelaus and Neoptolemus. The first battle of the war took place near the River Amnias. Nikomedes initially had the upper hand, but was caught off-guard by Scythian chariots at the service of Mithridates and was soundly defeated. He retreated through the path he had come to the Roman camp of Aquillius, from which he rapidly fled at the news of the advancing Pontic army.

David Magie notes that the Romans' plan of letting Nikomedes do the attack was a "folly" as that they recklessly divided their forces into three armies posted too far from each other. The plan ended in a "total failure" as a result.

=== Pontic counter-offensive ===
In a subsequent cavalry clash near Mount Scorobas, 100 Sarmathians defeated 800 Bithynians, which prompted Aquillius to retreat westwards. While on the move, Aquillius' army was defeated by Neoptolemus at the battle of Protopachium, with the loss of 10,000 soldiers. Aquillius then went all the way back to Pergamum, the capital of the province of Asia. Cassius, joined by Nikomedes, was unable to properly train more troops, and likewise retreated to Apameia, while Oppius moved back to Laodicea. Cassius in turn was abandoned by Nikomedes, who fled to Pergamum and then to Italy, where he stayed for the remainder of the war.

Mithridates rapidly exploited the void left by the Romans' departure and captured Bythinia without opposition. Pontic armies went as far as the Bosporus, where they received the surrender of the Roman ships guarding the straits, thus opening the Aegean Sea for the Pontic navy. In Phrygia, Cassius could not hold Apameia as its defences had been weakened by an earthquake and fled to Rhodes. Then, Mithridates promised the citizens of Laodicea that he would not harm them if they brought him Oppius, leading to his capture. This swift conquest of Asia through Phrygia took place in early 88.

Mithridates had a generous policy towards the cities he took, by offering them war reparations and setting free their prisoners. Even Oppius was apparently well-treated and remained in Mithridates' court throughout the war. The Asian Greeks swiftly ditched Roman rule mainly because of the publicans, the Roman tax-collectors whose greed was deeply resented by the locals. However, while Mithridates received the support of many cities during his triumphal march, his sweeping conquests did not extend to southwestern Asia, where many cities are mentioned resisting him. He had to fine and place a garrison in Stratoniceia; Archelaus was wounded while taking Magnesia on the Meander; Tabai in Caria, Telmessus and Patara in Lycia resisted the entire war. The Pontic king also took the island of Kos in the Aegean sea, where the Ptolemaic queen Cleopatra III had left her treasury; likewise, he also captured the treasury of the Bithynian kingdom, the source of his debt-relief program.

=== The Ephesian Vespers (summer–autumn 88 BC) ===
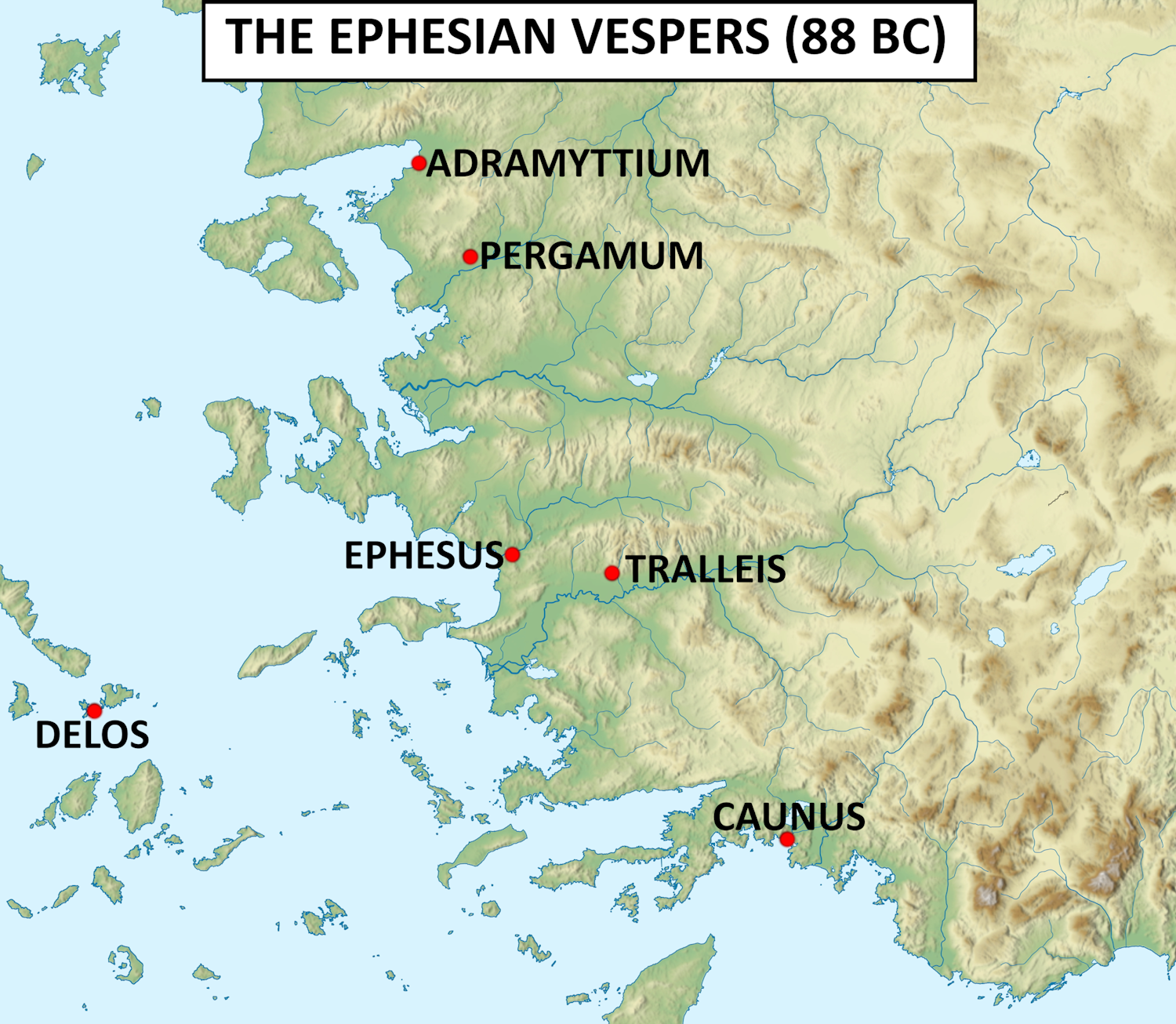
Map of the known massacre locations.

While he was in Ephesus, Mithridates devised the massacre of the Romans and Italians living in Asia, including women, children, and freedmen. In late summer or early autumn 88, he gave orders to his overseers to attack the Italians on a day set in advance. To encourage the slaughter, slaves killing their masters would receive manumission, people would be relieved of half their debt if they killed their Roman creditor, and assassins would share the wealth of their Roman victims with Mithridates. These orders were carried with fervour in many cities, as Roman publicans were universally loathed by the population after 40 years of extortion. Apart from Ephesus, the temporary residence of the king, Appian writes that massacres took place in Pergamum, Adramyttium, Tralles and Caunus, showing the extensive range of the event, from Troad to Caria. Romans were hunted even in the temples, normally places of shelter, apart from the temple of Asclepius in Kos.

The death toll was said to have reached 80,000, a figure that likely came from contemporary authors, such as the Memoirs of Sulla. Plutarch inflated that number to 150,000. Both numbers were likely exaggerated. The massacre was a clever way for Mithridates to bind these Asian communities to him, as they knew that Rome would never forgive them. Moreover, the wealth he took from the massacre further enhanced his rule, as it funded his generous philanthropic policies.

=== Siege of Rhodes (88 BC) ===
Rhodes was the last significant power in the Aegean Sea that resisted Mithridates. It was an important Roman ally, where Cassius had also retreated with his army. In autumn 88, the Pontic forces landed on the island and besieged the city. The Rhodians however launched several sorties on both land and sea that were successful. Mithridates then built a huge siege engine named sambuca, but this bridge manned with catapults was too heavy and collapsed, which prompted him to lift the siege. He also failed to take the Lycian city of Patara on his return. In both occasion, Mithridates pretexted portents to explain his failures. From this point on, Mithridates avoided putting himself on the frontline, therefore risking his personal prestige, and let his generals, principally Archelaus, campaign in his name.

Mithridates then sailed back to Asia to establish his headquarters in Pergamum. He stopped to Mytilene, where Aquilius had sought shelter, and captured him. Appian says that after humiliating him, Mithridates killed Aquilius by pouring molten gold into his mouth, in order to advertise that Roman greed was the cause of the war. It is nevertheless possible that Aquillius was taken prisoner with Oppius and released at the end of the war.

=== Athens joins Mithridates (88 BC) ===
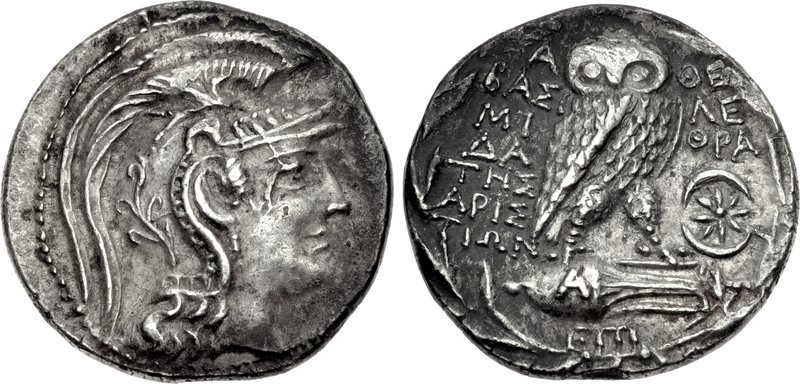
Tetradrachm of Athens, minted in 87 BC. The names of Mithridates and Aristion feature on the reverse, as well as the star within crescents, the symbol of Pontus, showing the new allegiance of the city.

Athens in the years preceding the war was dominated by a pro-Roman elite, especially by Medeius, who was uniquely elected eponymous archon three times in a row between 91 and 89, though he apparently lost his grip on the city in 88. The news of Pontus' victories was welcomed with enthusiasm in Athens. Following the fall of Medeius in 88, the ecclesia voted the dispatch of a delegation to Mithridates headed by Athenion, a peripatetic philosopher. Once in Asia, he sent letters to Athens praising Mithridates, saying that the king would restore civil order, democracy, and relieve debts, the three most pressing issues at the time in the city. Athenion made a triumphal return, and was elected hoplite general with a special power to choose all the other magistrates. Christian Habicht suggests that he appointed Mithridates as the eponymous archon, which, given the cultural importance of Athens, turned him into the symbolic leader of the Greek world. Athenion's election de facto meant a break with Rome, something that a minority of Athenian residents (citizens and foreigners) did not accept, such as the head of the Academy, Philo of Larissa, who moved to Rome. To prevent his opponents from leaving Athens, Athenion placed guards at the gates of the city, therefore transforming his government into an oppressive regime.

More serious for Athens was the defection of Delos, a small island in the middle of the Aegean Sea. A property of Athens, the island was the main slave-market of the Mediterranean Sea and a major trading post for Roman and Italian businessmen. The Delians refused to follow their metropolis and remained loyal to Rome, doubtless under the leadership of the local Italians. Athens was on its own to quell the revolt, since Mithridates had not yet sent any force across the sea, so Athenion tasked a fellow philosopher, Apellicon of Teos, with taking Delos back. The Athenians were however defeated just after having disembarked, by Orbius, the Roman prefect.

=== Pontic conquest of Greece ===
At this point, Mithridates directed a large army commanded by Archelaus to Greece, which stopped by Delos. As in Asia, the 20,000 Italians of Delos were murdered by the Pontic general Menophanes. He also captured the large treasure of the temple of Apollo and gave it to an Athenian from his entourage named Aristion, an epicurean philosopher. Since Athenion disappears from the sources after his defeat at Delos, several scholars have considered that Aristion and Athenion were the same person, but the majority consider them to be different. Archelaus sent Aristion to Athens with 2,000 men and the treasure of Apollo, which he used to become tyrant. He apparently purged the city from leading pro-Roman citizens, by either killing them or deporting them to Amisus, in Pontic territory on the southern coast of the Black Sea.

The arrival of Archelaus in Greece triggered a new wave of defections to Pontus, although his conquest was not as sweeping as that of Mithridates in Asia, as there are reports of resistance in several places. In the Peloponnese, he received the submission of Achaea, as well as Sparta after a battle. In central Greece, Boeotia went over to Mithridates, apart from Thespiae, which had to be besieged.

In the north, a second Pontic army moved to Greece through the land route, but the timeline of this army is not clear from ancient sources; it was commanded by Arcathias, a son of Mithridates. This army had conquered Thrace and Macedonia, maybe by using Thracians as allies or mercenaries. It captured Abdera en route and besieged Amphipolis, which possibly resisted until 87, when Taxilles replaced Arcathias who had died of illness at Tisaeum in northern Thessaly. The northern Pontic army likely defeated in an unknown location the two legions of Sentius, the propraetor of Macedonia, who disappears from the sources at this point. A detachment of the northern Pontic army commanded by Metrophanes had to use force to conquer Euboea and Magnesia, centred around the fortress of Demetrias. Many other islands were conquered, but Thasos in the northern Aegean Sea resisted Mithridates for the entirety of the war.

The Roman resistance in Greece was organised by Quintus Braetius Sura, a legate appointed by Sentius, who hindered the Pontic army from progressing in spite of his small forces. He defended the Athamanians, the Greek tribe in the mountains bordering Thessaly to the west. Sura also defeated Metrophanes in an unspecified location and blocked Archelaus and Aristion in Chaeroneia for three days.

The reason behind Mithridates' intervention in Greece is not clear, as it would have been easier for him to only defend Asia rather than overextending his forces over the Aegean Sea. Modern scholars have suggested a number of possibilities. Perhaps he wanted to avoid fighting on his own soil and carry the war to Greece, or he felt compelled by his own propaganda presenting him as the new Alexander to act as the liberator of Greece. A hostile tradition among ancient authors ascribed to him a grand design of conquering Italy, but this seems improbable. It seems that Mithridates only decided to conquer Greece once he received the request from Athenion, which he saw as a unique opportunity. Greece would have also been a great bargaining chip in negotiations with Rome.

== Phase 2: Sulla's campaign in Greece ==
=== Civil war in Rome (88–87 BC) ===
Because of the Social War in Italy, Rome had been unable to stop Mithridates' swift advance in the Greek East. The Italian allies were mostly subdued by 88, notably thanks to Sulla, who won several important victories during the war. These successes helped him to get the consulship for 88, at the beginning of which he was additionally given the command of the war against Mithridates with the six legions he had led during the Social War. However, his old rival Gaius Marius engineered his removal from the Mithridatic command with the help of the tribune of the plebs Publius Sulpicius, who used an armed gang to coerce the citizens’ assembly into voting the transfer of Sulla's command to Marius. Sulla reacted by marching on Rome with his army of loyal veterans, who easily captured the city. Sulla’s soldiers supported his coup because they feared they would be deprived of the booty that a victory against Mithridates would bring them. He then killed Sulpicius and forced Marius and some other of his enemies to go into exile. Moreover, he enacted several constitutional reforms and stayed in Rome until the end of the year in order to influence the elections, all of which further delayed his departure to Greece.

Sulla finally left in early 87, but in Rome, tensions rapidly escalated between Cinna and Octavius—the new consuls of 87—over Sulla's settlement. A civil war followed, from which Cinna emerged victorious, with the help of Marius, back from exile with his own veterans. Marius and Cinna violently purged Rome from their enemies, murdering Octavius and some of Sulla's friends. Sulla was declared enemy of the state and his command given back to Marius. He nevertheless ignored the order and continued the campaign as planned, even though he had by now entered in rebellion.

In his Life of Sulla, Plutarch writes that Sulla was followed in his private campaign by so many senators that he could constitute a counter-senate around him, but this story is likely based on his Memoirs, and intended to give some kind of legality to his rebellion. Ernst Badian showed that very few nobiles followed Sulla, who actually lacked senior officers around him. The most prominent of his supporters was Lucullus, the only member of his staff that stayed with him during his March on Rome, who received the most important missions. Other names include Aulus Gabinius, Lucius Minucius Basilus, Lucius Licinius Murena, Gaius Scribonius Curio, Lucius Hortensius, and a Sulpicius Galba, the only name from a great family. In fact, many Roman aristocrats remained in Rome for the whole troubled decade, and even those who fled from Italy went to other Roman provinces: Gaul, Africa, and Spain, but not to Sulla. The March on Rome and his subsequent rebellion had provoked a strong rejection of Sulla within the Roman elite.

=== Sulla's arrival in Greece and the siege of Athens (spring 87 – Spring 86 BC) ===
Sulla disembarked his army in Epirus (probably Dyrrachium, possibly Apollonia) in spring 87. He then followed the via Egnatia to the east and turned right towards Thessaly. His progression through Greece was unopposed; many cities were forced to contribute supplies, especially bullion, which was used by Lucullus to mint coins for the soldiers' wages. Even Sadalas, the king of the Odrysians, sent help, as a Thracian prince named Amatocus was put at the head of the garrison of Chaeronea by Sulla. In Boeotia, Thebes returned its allegiance without a fight. Sulla also ordered Braetius, the legate who had hold on Greece, to leave to Macedonia. He did not want another to steal victory from him.

In the winter of 87-86, Sulla might have won a small battle that forced Aristion and Archelaus to move back to Attica. Following them, Sulla split his army in two: one to besiege Athens controlled by Aristion, while he personally commanded the other besieging Piraeus, where Archelaus was based. The famous Long Walls of Classical Athens no longer connected the two cities, so he could isolate them from each other. He notably built siege engines by destroying the groves of Plato's Academy and Aristotle's Lyceum. The situation was more desperate for Aristion, because Archelaus could receive supplies from the sea. Indeed, Sulla had no fleet to block the harbour; he therefore sent Lucullus to gather ships among Roman allies and clients in the Eastern Mediterranean Sea, up to Phoenicia.

Unable to receive supplies from Archelaus, Athens starved and finally fell on 1 March 86, when Roman soldiers breached the western wall. They then started to slaughter the population until Sulla ordered them to stop, after having heard the supplications of several members of his staff and leading Athenians, including a Medeius, perhaps the former pro-Roman tyrant, or his son. In any case, many buildings were destroyed and artworks looted. Aristion nevertheless resisted in the Acropolis for several months, besieged by the legate Scribonius Curio while Sulla continued his campaign. He finally gave up after running out of water and was executed, together with the magistrates of 87/86. In Piraeus, Archelaus held on until the northern army of Taxillas arrived in central Greece, when he retreated by ship to the island of Euboea. From Chalcis in Euboea, he marched to the Thermopylae and made the junction with Taxillas' forces.

=== Chaeronea and Orchomenos (86 BC) ===
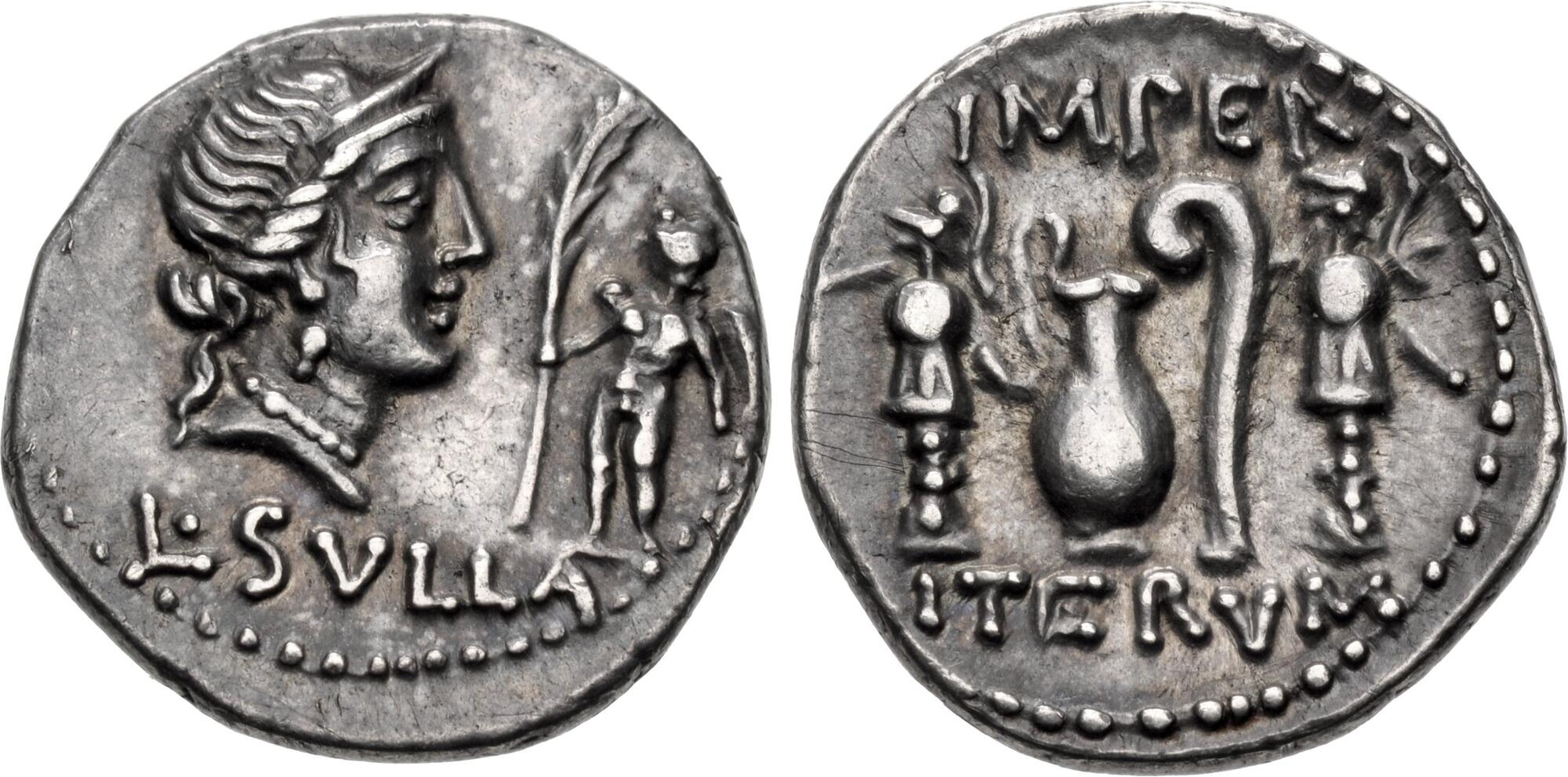
Denarius of Sulla, minted in Greece in 84-83 BC. The obverse features the head of Venus, his patron-goddess, while the reverse refer to the two trophies he built at Chaeronea.

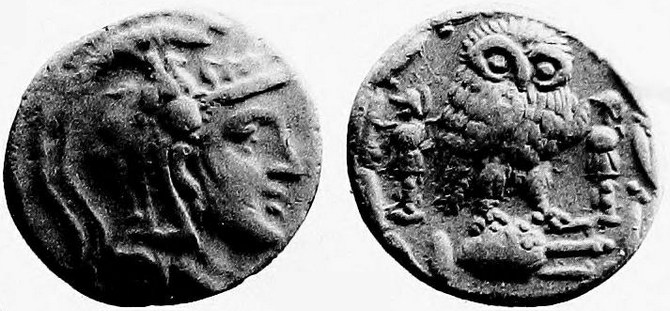
Tetradrachm of Athens minted under Sulla (86–84 BC), which also features the two trophies of Chaeronea on the reverse.

Sulla could count on his five legions of 6,000 men each, plus about 10,000 Greek allies, against a Pontic army said to number between 60,000 (Memnon) and 120,000 soldiers (Appian), who vastly outnumbered Sulla, especially in cavalry. He moved his army to the Boeotian plain, probably to force a land battle, therefore offsetting his lack of naval power. Near Chaeronea, Sulla outmanoeuvred the Pontic forces in the preliminary moves of the battle, which prevented them from properly deploying their cavalry, scythed chariots and phalanx. Archelaus' army was pushed back and slaughtered during its flight, because there was no proper escape route from the Pontic camp. He retreated to Chalcis on the island of Euboea with only 10,000 soldiers.

After his victory, Sulla moved northwards to face the arrival of an army sent by the official government in Rome, but while at Melitaea, he found out that Archelaus had received the reinforcement of another army of 80,000 soldiers led by the Pontic general Dorylaus. Archelaus landed in Greece and deployed again his forces in Boeotia, forcing Sulla to go back to confront him. Once again, Sulla thwarted the Pontic army' superiority in cavalry by digging trenches in the field near the city of Orchomenos, not far from Chaeronea. The battle was another Roman triumph, with 35,000 Pontic soldiers dead and 25,000 captured and sold into slavery. According to Sherwin-White, the main reason of Sulla’s victories was the great experience accumulated by his legions during the Social War, "to a level seldom reached before". He notes that less experienced legions fared much worse against Pontic armies in the subsequent Mithridatic Wars.

Sulla erected three trophies on the sites of the twin battles, which were described by Plutarch as they still stood in his time. Two trophies have been uncovered, in 1991 for Chaeronea and 2004 for Orchomenos. These trophies were later used for his propaganda; they appeared on some of his coins and on his new signet ring. He also razed several Boeotian cities that had shifted their allegiance (Anthedon, Larymna, Halae).

== Phase 3: Fimbria's campaign in Asia ==
=== Flaccus' murder (86 BC) ===
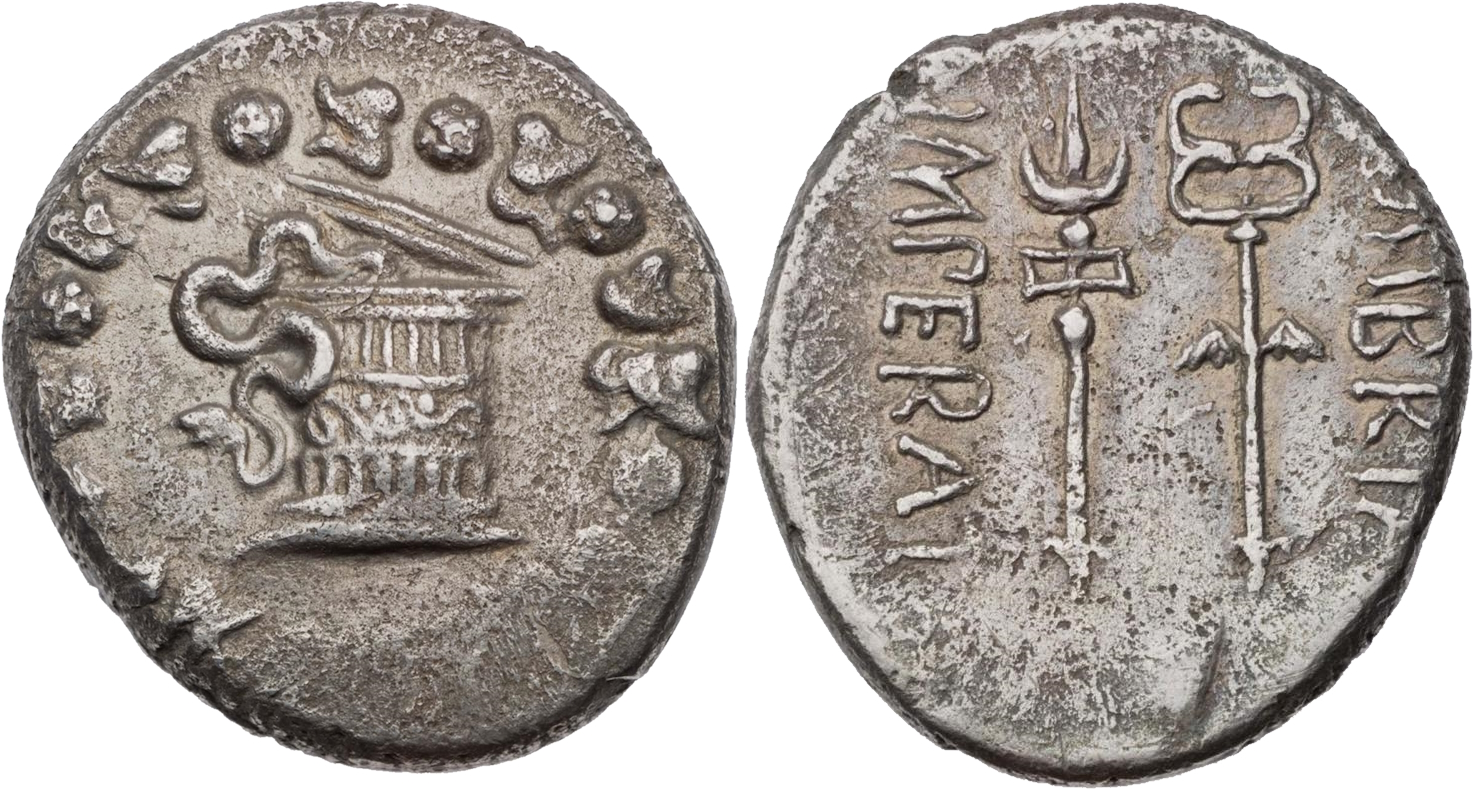
Cistophorus minted by Fimbria in 85 in Pergamum. On the reverse, the legend tells he used the title "imperator"; he was the first Roman to do so on his coinage, even before Sulla.

In Rome, Marius died soon after the beginning of his seventh consulship, on 14 January 86. Lucius Valerius Flaccus, a patrician from a distinguished family and former governor of Asia, was elected suffect consul and given the official conduct of the war against Mithridates. He only received the command of two legions, as it was assumed that he would later take over the five legions of Sulla. Perhaps Cinna had also wanted Flaccus to arrive to Asia before Sulla and be the first to claim victory. However, as Flaccus was without war experience, Cinna adjoined him a quaestor: Gaius Fulvius Fimbria, a radical supporter of Marius, who had participated in his massacre in 87. Cinna possibly wanted to get rid of the embarrassing presence of Fimbria in Rome by sending him to the East.

Sulla was in Thessaly when Flaccus' army passed by to Asia. None made a move against the other, maybe because both generals feared that their soldiers would desert to the other army. Some ancient authors still mentions that a few of Flaccus' soldiers deserted to Sulla, but that Fimbria's firm action avoided further defections. Sulla wintered in Thessaly in 86/85, letting Flaccus carry his own war against Mithridates.

After Flaccus took Philippi in Macedonia, Pontic forces withdrew to Asia. He could thus advance rapidly through a territory now devoid of Pontic garrisons, but he let his soldiers live off the land, possibly in an attempt to stop them from defecting to Sulla. At the beginning of 86/85 winter, he arrived at Byzantium, where a quarrel erupted with Fimbria. The majority of the sources, the most detailed being Appian, tell that Flaccus deposed Fimbria, who reacted violently. He chased Flaccus up to Nicomedia, where he murdered him and outraged his corpse. The soldiers then accepted Fimbria as their new commander. This story was likely found in Sulla's Memoirs. Memnon tells a different story, that Flaccus was murdered by some soldiers angry at his poor command. Although Fimbria was suspected of plotting his murder, the senate agreed to transfer Flaccus' command to him.

=== Fimbria’s campaign (85 BC) ===
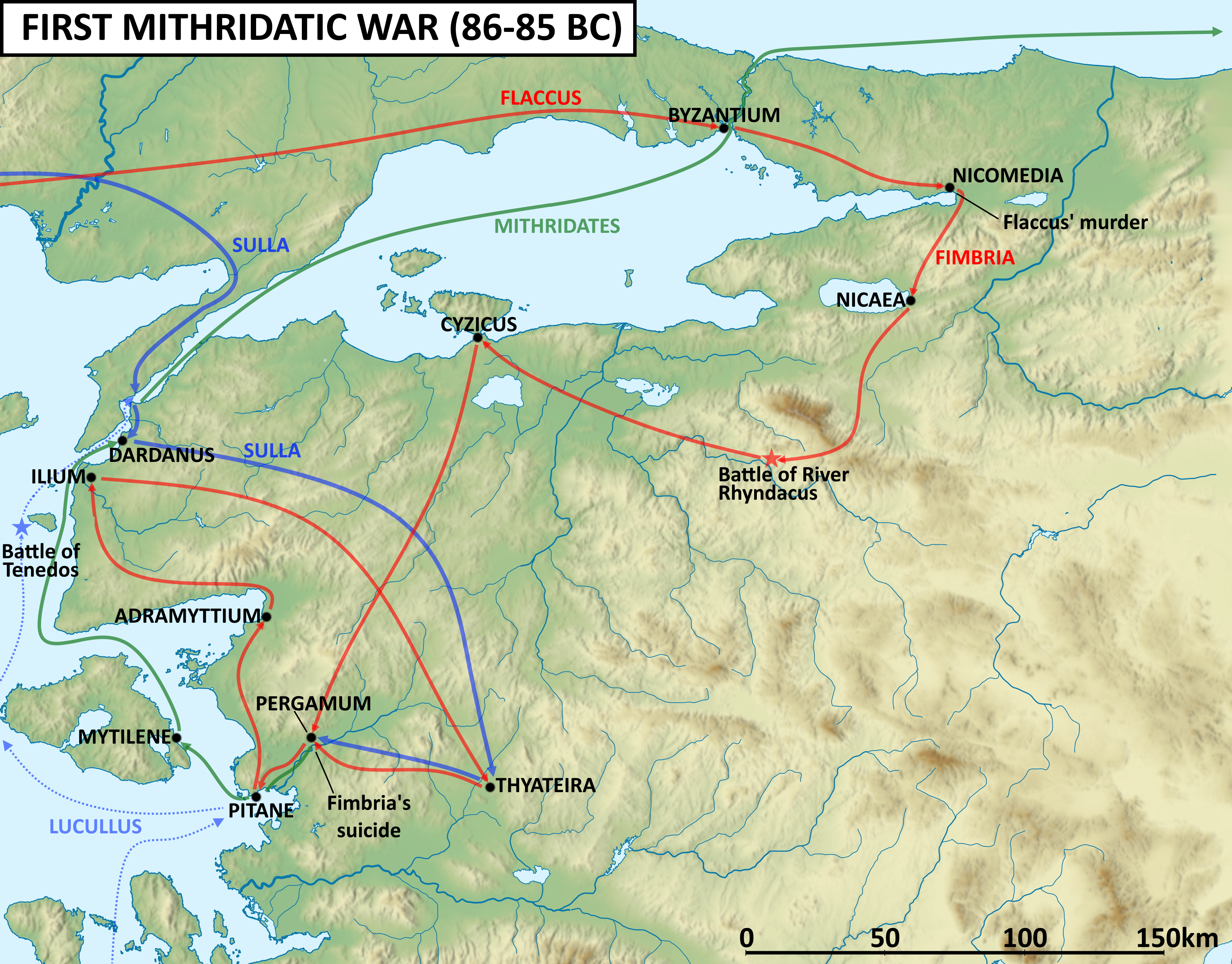
Map of the final phase of the war (86–85 BC).

After having been officially appointed commander, Fimbria resumed the campaign, even though at this point Mithridates had already been defeated by Sulla. Still, Mithridates gathered one last army, commanded by another son (also named Mithridates), to counter Fimbria's advance. Fimbria moved to the south, by following the shore of the Sea of Marmara, plundering the cities of Nicomedia and Cyzicus on his way.

In early summer 85, Fimbria won a first battle on the Rhyndacus river, where he killed 6,000 Pontic horsemen, forcing prince Mithridates to retreat. Launching a night attack, Fimbria took the Pontic camp by surprise and completely destroyed the army. As a result, Mithridates could not oppose Fimbria's rapid march through Mysia to Pergamum, which the king abandoned to Pitane, on the coast, under the protection of his warships. Meanwhile, Sulla's legate Lucullus had returned from the eastern Mediterranean Sea with a fleet; he captured en route Caria, Samos, Chios, and Colophon. Once he arrived off Pitane, he refused Fimbria's request to capture Mithridates and even let him escape to Mytilene on the island of Lesbos.

Fimbria moved northwards to Troad in order to besiege Troy (also called Ilium), which fell after 11 days. As the inhabitants had called Sulla for help, Fimbria slaughtered them and burned the city. At this point Sulla relaunched peace negotiations with Mithridates in order to prevent Fimbria and the official Roman government from winning the war.

=== The treaty of Dardanos ===
Peace negotiations between Sulla and Pontus had opened as early as 86, soon after the battle of Orchomenos. He first met Archelaus at Delion, on the Boeotian coast. Archelaus initially offered money to Sulla to fund a war against Cinna, while Mithridates could keep Asia in return. The negotiations continued and Sulla finally demanded that Mithridates restore the kings of Bithynia and Cappadocia, surrender all his conquests during the war, pay a fine of 2,000 talents, release Oppius and Aquillius (if he was still alive) and give 70 warships to Sulla, while he would receive the title of friend and ally of Rome and keep his kingdom. These terms were very favourable and Archelaus accepted, pending the approval of Mithridates, who nevertheless postponed his reply, because he refused to give away Paphlagonia and his warships. After Fimbria took Pergamum, Mithridates was under too much pressure and preferred agreeing with Sulla's terms.

The final meeting took place at Dardanos on the Troad coast in late summer or early autumn 85, after Sulla had passed to Asia on the Chersonesos peninsula to Abydos, thanks to Lucullus’ fleet, which had also won a small battle off Tenedos island against a Pontic squadron. Mithridates had requested to meet Sulla in person for the signature of the treaty, maybe to give the appearance of a negotiated settlement between equals and not a dictate imposed by Rome. Sulla came with 5 cohorts, Mithridates with 26,000 men, whom Sherwin-White identified as the survivors of the battle of the Rhyndacus. Mithridates formally accepted Sulla's terms and reconciled with Nicomedes and Ariobarzanes, the kings of Bithynia and Cappadocia, who were also present. The treaty of Dardanos was in effect a return to the status quo of 89. Mithridates could therefore retain his kingdom unscathed—since no Pontic city was sacked during the war, as well as his possessions in the Black Sea. He was also to be declared friend and ally of Rome, a status that would prevent future raids from Roman armies. The treaty was so kind to Pontus that Sulla's soldiers expressed their dissatisfaction, because they were deprived of the promised booty.

In his Memoirs, Sulla justified the treaty of Dardanos by the necessity for him to rapidly turn his forces against his Cinno-Marians enemies in Italy. However, Sulla did not return to Italy before 83, spending significant time in Asia and Greece. In fact, Sulla was not in an absolutely dominant position against Mithridates. Firstly, the Pontic navy remained superior on the sea. Secondly, Mithridates could have also opened negotiations with Fimbria instead of him, which would have placed Sulla in a difficult situation, without a navy, against the army of the legal Roman government and Pontus. After signing the treaty, Sulla dispatched a report to the senate about the pacification of the East, as if he had not been removed from his command, a move that must have triggered anxiety for Cinna and his supporters in Rome, as it meant that his comeback would happen soon.

=== Fimbria's suicide ===
After Dardanus, Sulla finally made his move against Fimbria. He marched south to the city of Thyatira, where Fimbria had halted, and requested that he surrender his legions to him, arguing that his command was unlawful, to which Fimbria answered that Sulla was the illegal commander. Fimbria ordered his men to fight Sulla, but they refused as they were clearly outnumbered. When his soldiers gradually deserted him, Fimbria fled alone to Pergamum, where he sought shelter in the temple of Asclepius. As Sulla did not relent, Fimbria committed suicide into the temple (with the help of a slave). Only two of Fimbria's men refused to join Sulla: Lucius Magius and Lucius Fannius, who then had an adventurous life as pirates and officers of Mithridates.

== Aftermath ==
=== Settlement of Asia ===
The death of Fimbria left Sulla the master of Greece and Western Asia, which he could settle as he pleased. He first rewarded the allies of Rome that had remained faithful throughout the war. The city of Thasos received the islands of Sciathos and Peparethos, while Rhodes recovered several territories on the mainland, which it had been deprived by Rome after the Third Macedonian War in 168.

On the other hand, the cities that betrayed Rome and helped Mithridates were severely punished. Sulla confiscated 10,000 plethra of land from Euboea for having been the main base of operation of Pontus in Greece, which he gave to his new friend Archelaus as his personal domain. He confiscated half of Thebes' territory and dedicated it to the gods Apollo and Zeus, so the lands' income would go to the sanctuaries of Delphi, Epidaurus and Olympia as a compensation for having seized their tresuries at the beginning of his campaign.

The worst punishment was for the cities of the province of Asia. During the winter of 85/84, Sulla convened their representatives to Ephesus, where he announced that they would have to pay a gigantic indemnity of 20,000 talents (one talent was about 26 kg of silver). It amounted to five years of arrears, for the period during which taxes could not be collected (89 to 85), plus a fine of 8,000 talents, four times what he imposed on Mithridates. Asian cities furthermore had to bear the cost of quartering Roman legionaries during the winter of 85-84, with every legionary receiving a stipend. Many of these cities also lost their freedom by passing under the direct control of the Roman governor. As the publicans had all fled the province or been killed during the Asian Vespers, Sulla created a system of direct taxation, by drawing 44 fiscal districts for this purpose. His system survived well into the Roman Empire. Nevertheless, Sulla’s settlement crippled the province for decades, because the Asian cities could not pay the tax burden. By 70, they had already contracted a staggering debt of 120,000 talents.

In 84, Sulla returned to Greece. During his second passage in Athens, he was welcome as a liberator. A state festival, the Sylleia, was even created in his honour. The city was not included in the penalties imposed on the Asian cities; Sulla even allowed it to retain Delos, though the island's economy never recovered from the war. He also visited Euboeia, where he cured his gout in the spring of Aedepsus.

=== After Sulla's departure (83 BC) ===
Once the Greek East settled, Sulla turned to his enemies in Rome. He won the subsequent civil war against the Cinno-Marians, thanks to the experience of his troops and the money extorted from Mithridates and Asia. After his victory, Sulla passed a law, the lex Valeria, which legalised all his deeds in the East. However, the treaty of Dardanos was never ratified by the senate; thus the situation in Asia remained hazardous. Sulla did not trust the two legions of Fimbria, which he left in the care of his legate Lucius Licinius Murena. An ambitious man, Murena coveted a triumph. Once Sulla had departed to Italy, he was free to pursue his own path and launched an aggression against Pontus, which started the Second Mithridatic War.

== Bibliography ==
- Eric Adler, "Who's Anti-Roman? Sallust and Pompeius Trogus on Mithridates", in The Classical Journal, Vol. 101, No. 4 (Apr. - May, 2006), pp. 383–407.
- Ernst Badian, Foreign Clientelae (264–70 B.C.), Oxford, Clarendon Press, 1958.
- ——, "Waiting for Sulla", The Journal of Roman Studies, 1962, Vol. 52, Parts 1 and 2 (1962), pp. 47–61.
- ——, Studies in Greek and Roman History, Oxford, Blackwell, 1964.
- ——, Roman Imperialism in the Late Republic, Oxford, Blackwell, 1968.'
- ——, Lucius Sulla, the Deadly Reformer, Sydney, University of Sydney Press, 1970. ISBN 0-424-06090-6
- ——, "Rome, Athens and Mithridates", in American Journal of Ancient History, 1 (1976), pp. 105–128.
- Glenn Richard Bugh, "Athenion and Aristion of Athens", Phoenix, Vol. 46, No. 2 (Summer, 1992), pp. 108–123.
- François de Callataÿ, L'histoire des guerres mithridatiques vue par les monnaies, Numismatica Lovaniensia 18, Louvain-la-Neuve, 1997. ISSN 2593-693X
- John Camp, Michael Ierardi, Jeremy McInerney, Kathryn Morgan, Gretchen Umholtz, "A Trophy from the Battle of Chaironeia of 86 B. C.", American Journal of Archaeology, Jul., 1992, Vol. 96, No. 3 (Jul., 1992), pp. 443–455.
- Tim Cornell (editor), The Fragments of the Roman Historians, Oxford University Press, 2013. ISBN 978-0-19-927705-6
- Michael Crawford, Roman Republican Coinage, Cambridge University Press, 1974. ISBN 9780521074926
- Alexandra Eckert & Alexander Thein, Sulla, Politics and Reception, de Gruyter, Berlin/Boston, 2019. ISBN 978-3110618099
- Dennis G. Glew, "The Selling of the King: A Note on Mithridates Eupator's Propaganda in 88 B.C.", Hermes, 105. Bd., H. 2 (1977), pp. 253–256.
- ——, "Between the Wars: Mithridates Eupator and Rome, 85–73 B.C.", Chiron, 11, 1981, pp. 109–130.
- Erich S. Gruen, Roman Politics and the Criminal Courts, 149–78 B.C., Cambridge, MA, Harvard University Press, 1978. ISBN 0-674-28420-8.
- John G. F. Hind, "Mithridates", in J. A Crook, Andrew Lintott, Elizabeth Rawson, The Cambridge Ancient History, vol. IX, The Last Age of the Roman Republic, 146–43 B.C., Cambridge University Press, 1992, pp. 165–207. ISBN 0521256038
- Jakob Munk Højte (editor), Mithridates VI and the Pontic Kingdom, Aarhus University Press, 2009. ISBN 978-87-793-4443-3
- Robert Kallet-Marx, Hegemony to Empire: The Development of the Roman Imperium in the East from 148 to 62 B. C., Berkeley/Los Angeles; University of California Press, 1996. ISBN 978-0520080751
- Arthur Keaveney, Sulla, the Last Republican, London/New York, Routledge, 2005 (first published in 1982). ISBN 0-415-33660-0
- E. Kountouri, N. Petrochilos, S. Zoumbaki, "The Tropaion of Sulla over Mithridates VI Eupator: A First Approach", V. Di Napoli, F. Camia, V. Evangelidis, D. Grigoropoulos, D. Rogers, S. Vlizos (editors), What’s New in Roman Greece?, Recent Work on the Greek Mainland and the Islands in the Roman Period, Athens, Institute of Historical Research, 2018, pp. 359–368. ISBN 978-960-9538-79-4
- Inger N. I. Kuin, "Rewriting Family History: Strabo and the Mithridatic Wars", Phoenix, Vol. 71, No. 1/2 (Spring-Summer/printemps-été 2017), pp. 102–118.
- Andrew W. Lintott, "The Offices of C. Flavius Fimbria in 86-5 B.C.", Historia: Zeitschrift für Alte Geschichte, Bd. 20, H. 5/6 (4th Qtr., 1971), pp. 696–701.
- Michael Lovano, The Age of Cinna: Crucible of Late Republican Rome, Stuttgart, Franz Steiner Verlag, 2002. ISBN 978-3-515-07948-8
- T. J. Luce, "Marius and the Mithridatic Command", Historia: Zeitschrift für Alte Geschichte, Bd. 19, H. 2 (Apr., 1970), pp. 161–194.
- Brian C. McGing, The Foreign Policy of Mithridates VI Eupator, King of Pontus, Leiden, 1986. ISBN 978-90-04-07591-7
- Christopher S. Mackay, Breakdown of the Roman Republic, from Oligarchy to Empire, Cambridge University Press, 2009. ISBN 978-0-521-51819-2
- David Magie, Roman Rule in Asia Minor, Princeton University Press, 1950.
- David Mulroy, "The Early Career of P. Clodius Pulcher: A Re-Examination of the Charges of Mutiny and Sacrilege", Transactions of the American Philological Association, 1988, Vol. 118 (1988), pp. 155–178.
- T. Ñaco del Hoyo, B. Antela-Bernárdez, I. Arrayás-Morales, S. Busquets-Artigas, "The 'Ultimate Frontier': War, Terror and the Greek Poleis between Mithridates and Rome", in Frontiers in the Roman World: Proceedings of the Ninth Workshop of the International Network Impact of Empire (Durham, 16–19 April 2009), 2011, pp. 291–304.
- Duane W. Roller, Empire of the Black Sea: The Rise and Fall of the Mithridatic World, Oxford University Press, 2020. ISBN 978-0190887841
- Federico Santangelo, Sulla, the Elites and the Empire, A Study of Roman Policies in Italy and the Greek East, Leiden/Boston, Brill, 2007. ISBN 9789004163867
- Robin Seager, "Sulla", in J. A Crook, Andrew Lintott, Elizabeth Rawson, The Cambridge Ancient History, vol. IX, The Last Age of the Roman Republic, 146–43 B.C., Cambridge University Press, 1992, pp. 165–207. ISBN 0521256038
- Adrian Nicolas Sherwin-White, "Roman Involvement in Anatolia, 167-88 B.C.", in The Journal of Roman Studies, Vol. 67 (1977), pp. 62–75.
- ——, Roman Foreign Policy in the East, 168 B.C. to A.D. 1, London, Duckworth, 1984. ISBN 071561682X
- Hermann Weber, The Weber Collection, volume II, Greek Coins, London, Spink & Son, 1924.
- Richard B. Witschonke, Michel Amandry, "Another Fimbria Cistophorus", American Journal of Numismatics (1989-), Vol. 16/17 (2004–05), pp. 87–92.
- Catherine Wolff, "Les légions de Fimbria", Latomus, T. 72, Fasc. 2 (Juin 2013), pp. 338–349.
