= Aristion =

1st-century BC Athenian tyrant

Aristion (Greek: Άριστίων; died 1 March 86 BC in Athens) was a philosopher who became tyrant of Athens from c. 88 BC until he was executed in 86 BC. Aristion joined forces with King Mithridates VI of Pontus against Greece's overlords, the Romans, fighting alongside Pontic forces during the First Mithridatic War, but to no avail. On 1 March 86 BC, after a long and destructive siege, Athens was taken by the Roman general Lucius Cornelius Sulla, who had Aristion executed.

== Life ==
Aristion's early history is preserved by Athenaeus on the authority of Posidonius. Posidonius calls him Athenion and makes him a Peripatetic philosopher, whereas others, Pausanias, Appian, and Plutarch, call him Aristion, and Appian calls him an Epicurean philosopher. There is no universally accepted resolution to this confusion, and it is possible that two separate tyrants held power in Athens in quick succession during the First Mithridatic War, whose stories became conflated together. This is the most commonly accepted explanation for the confusion between the two figures. Athenion was likely an Athenian citizen and Peripatetic philosopher elected as a hoplite general in 88 BC. Aristion is a fellow Peripatetic philosopher who seized the reigns of Athenian government in c. 88 BC.

Aristion was the illegitimate son of a Peripatetic philosopher to whose party he succeeded, so he became an Athenian citizen. He married early and began teaching philosophy at the same time, which he did with great success at Messene and Larissa. On returning to Athens with a considerable fortune, he was named ambassador to Mithridates, king of Pontus, which was at war with Rome; Aristion became one of Mithridates's most intimate friends and counsellors. His letters to Athens represented the power of Mithridates in such glowing colors that his countrymen began to conceive of hopes of throwing off Roman rule. Mithridates then sent him to Athens around 88 BC, where he soon contrived, through the king's patronage, to assume the tyranny. His government seems to have been of the most cruel character, so Plutarch wrote with horror and classed by him with Nabis and Catiline. He sent Apellicon of Teos to plunder the sacred treasury of Delos, though Appian says that this had already been done for him by Mithridates and added that it was by means of the money resulting from this robbery that Aristion was enabled to obtain supreme power. Meanwhile, Sulla landed in Greece and immediately laid siege to Athens and Piraeus, the latter occupied by Archelaus, the general of Mithridates. The sufferings within the city from famine were so dreadful that cannibalism was reported. Eventually, Athens was stormed, and Sulla gave orders to spare neither age nor sex. Aristion fled to the Acropolis, having first burned the Odeon, in case Sulla should use the woodwork for battering rams and other instruments of attack. The Acropolis, however, was soon taken, and Aristion was dragged to execution from the altar of Athena and poisoned. Pausanias attributes the unpleasant disease that later killed Sulla as divine vengeance for this impiety.
