= Battle of Tenedos (86 BC) =

Naval battle between the forces of Mithridates VI of Pontus and the Roman Republic

Battle of Tenedos (86BC)
- Part of the First Mithridatic War
Date	86 BC
Location	near the island of Tenedos (modern-day Bozcaada, Çanakkale, Turkey)
Result	Roman victory

Belligerents
Roman Republic	Kingdom of Pontus

Commanders and leaders
Lucius Licinius Lucullus	Neoptolemus

The Battle of Tenedos of 86 BC was a naval battle between the forces of Mithridates VI of Pontus and those of the Roman Republic. The Roman-allied fleet was led by Lucius Licinius Lucullus while the Pontic fleet was led by Neoptolemus. The Roman-allied fleet was victorious and ended Pontic naval supremacy in the Aegean and allowed the Romans to start transporting their army into Asia-Minor. The battle of Tenedos of 86 BC is part of the First Mithridatic War. There is another battle of Tenedos in 73 BC during the Third Mithridatic War.

After winning two naval engagements Lucullus finally found the main Pontic fleet near the Island of Tenedos. Lucullus himself was on a ship commanded by an experienced Rhodian sailer, one Damagoras, who sailed his ship directly toward Mithridates' commander Neoptolemus. The Pontic admiral sought to ram Lucullus' ship in a head-on-attack. Damagoras skillfully avoided the attack, and Lucullus was able to orchestrate a victory over the Pontic fleet. After the battle Mithridates' naval forces all over the Aegean were in full retreat.

== Notes ==
1.Since the Romans did not have a fleet at the beginning of the war they borrowed ships and crews of their allies. In this case Lucullus had collected Greek, Cretan, Cyrene, Egyptyian and Rhodian naval contingents.
