= Second Mithridatic War =

War between Rome and Mithridates, 83–81 BC

- Part of the Mithridatic Wars
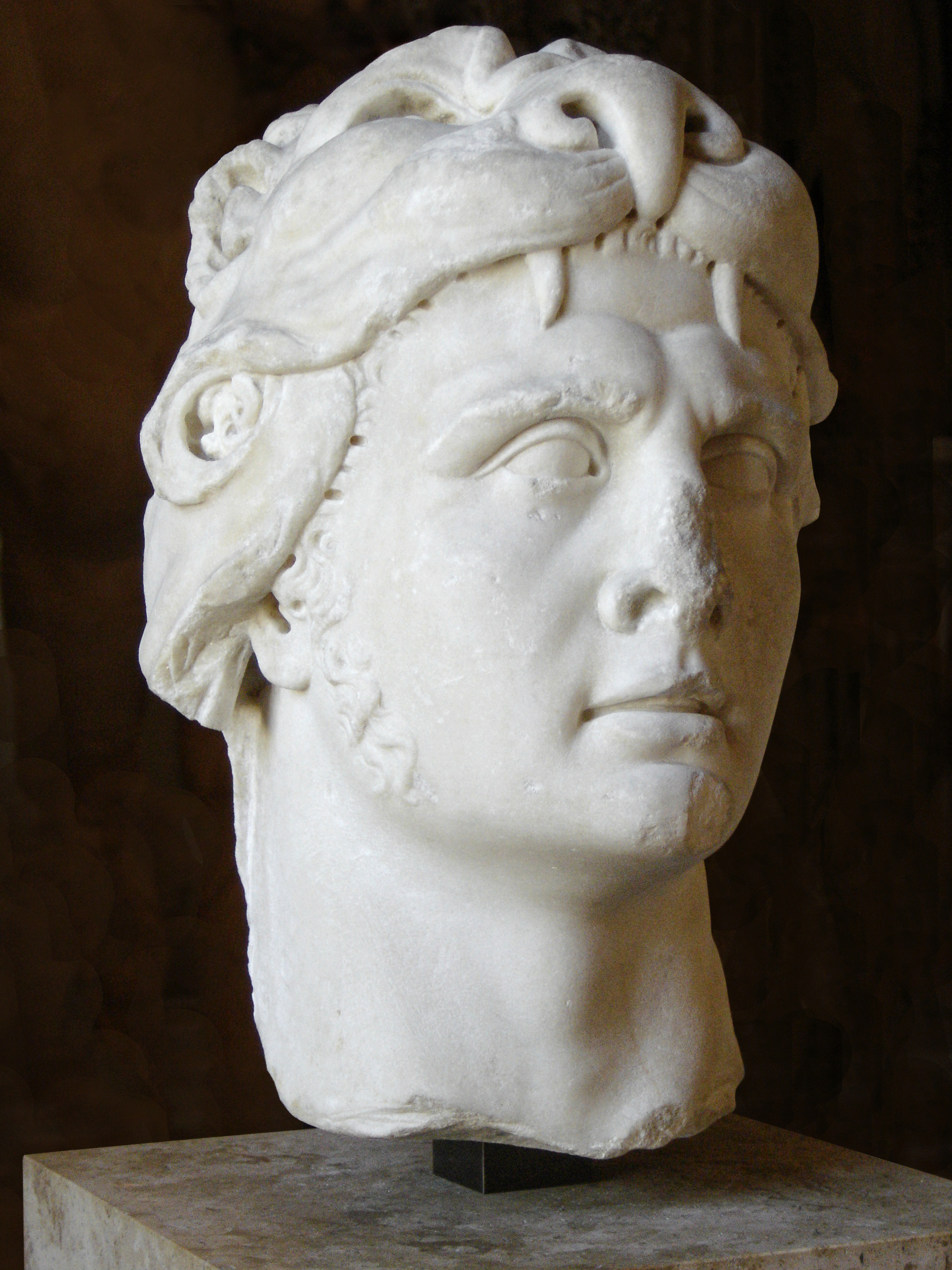
- Bust of King Mithridates VI of Pontus
Date	83–81 BC
Location	Asia Minor
Result	Pontic victory
Territorial changes	None, Mithridates left in possession of Pontus

Belligerents
Roman Republic	Kingdom of Pontus

Commanders and leaders
Lucius Licinius Murena	Mithridates VI of Pontus; Gordius of Cappadocia

The Second Mithridatic War (83–81 BC) was one of three wars fought between Pontus and the Roman Republic. This war was fought between King Mithridates VI of Pontus and the Roman general Lucius Licinius Murena.

== History ==
At the conclusion of the First Mithridatic War, Lucius Cornelius Sulla had come to a hasty agreement with Mithridates because Sulla had to return to Rome to deal with his political enemies. The peace treaty allowed Mithridates to remain in control of his Kingdom of Pontus, but he had to relinquish his claim to Asia Minor and respect pre-war borders. Murena, as Sulla's legate, was stationed in Asia as commander of the two legions formerly under the command of Gaius Flavius Fimbria. From Appian's work on this war (The Mithridatic Wars), we can deduce that it was put in command over Phrygia, which had been annexed to the Attalid kingdom in 188 BC, and, possibly, Cappadocia, which was an ally of Rome.

Appian wrote that Murena marched across Cappadocia and attacked Comana, a town which belonged to Mithridates, because of suspicions that the latter was preparing for war against the Romans. Mithridates was fitting a fleet and raising an army to deal with a rebellion by the Colchians and the tribes around the Cimmerian Bosphorus (the Kerch Strait). It was the scale of these preparations and the fact that Mithridates had not restored the whole of Cappadocia to their king, Ariobarzanes I, who was a Roman ally, which led to this impression. Mithridates sent envoys to invoke the peace treaty. Murena replied that he did not see any treaties because Sulla had not written it down before he returned to Greece. He then began looting and then returned to Cappadocia to winter there. Mithridates sent envoys to Rome to complain. In 82 BC Murena seized 400 villages which belonged to Mithridates, who did not try to counter this, preferring to wait for the return of the ambassadors. Murena returned to Phrygia and Galatia loaded with plunder. He was reached by a messenger of the senate who told him that the senate ordered him to leave Mithridates alone as he had not broken the treaty. However, he did not bring a decree and he was seen talking to Murena alone.

Murena invaded Mithridates’ territory. The latter thought that this was done under the orders of Rome and sent Gordius, his commander, to retaliate on Roman villages. Gordius seized a large number of animals and property and advanced against Murena. When Mithridates arrived there, a tough battle was fought and Murena was defeated. Murena fled to Phrygia, harassed by the enemy. This led many states in Asia Minor which had sided with Rome to switch allegiance. Mithridates drove all the Roman garrisons out of Cappadocia. Sulla disapproved of a war against Mithridates because he had not broken the treaty. Aulus Gabinius was sent to tell Murena that the order not to fight Mithridates was to be taken seriously. Gabinius then arranged a conference with Mithridates and Ariobarzanes I to reconcile them. Mithridates betrothed his four-year-old daughter to Ariobarzanes and stipulated that Ariobarzanes was to retain the part of Cappadocia he held at the time and also have another part. Murena was recalled to Rome.

Mennon wrote that when Mithridates sent his envoys to Murena, he ignored them because they were mostly Greek philosophers who disparaged Mithridates. He installed Ariobarzanes as king of Cappadocia and founded the city of Licinia near the border with Pontus. Meanwhile, Murena and Mithridates both sent envoys to the Heracleians to bid for their alliance. These replied that they could hardly protect themselves and could not help others. Some of Murena's advisers said that he should attack Sinope and then march on the capital of Pontus. If he seized it, other towns could be won over. Mithridates protected Sinope with a large force and prepared for war. At first he had the advantage, but then the battle was even. This blunted the two sides' appetite for war. Mithridates went further east and Murena returned to Asia.

This war was followed by the Third Mithridatic War.
