= Gök River =

River in Kastamonu, Turkey

Coordinates: 41.4077°N 35.1188°E

The Gök River or Gökırmak (Turkish for "Sky River") is a tributary of the Kızılırmak in Turkey. In the past it was called Amnias (Greek: Αμνίας). Its source is in Kastamonu Province. It may have been known to the Hittites as the Sariya. It was a holy river in the ancient country of Paphlagonia. The Battle of the River Amnias was fought in 89 BC between Mithradates VI of Pontus and Nicomedes IV of Bithynia during the First Mithridatic War.
