= Archelaus (Pontic army officer) =

Military officer of King Mithridates VI of Pontus

Archelaus (Greek: Ἀρχέλαος; fl. during the latter half of the second century BC and first half of first century BC, died by 63 BC) was a prominent Greek general who served under King Mithridates VI of Pontus in northern Anatolia and was also his favorite general.

== Family and early life ==
Archelaus was a Greek nobleman from Cappadocia, possibly of Macedonian descent. His parents are unknown, but his ancestors are thought to be Greeks who arrived in Anatolia after the expedition of Alexander the Great. He had a brother called Neoptolemus and his family were active in the Pontic Court. As he was a friend of Mithridates VI, the Pontic King gave Archelaus the court title of philos.

Along with Neoptolemus they both rose to prominence during the wars of Mithridates VI on the northern shores of the Black Sea. Archelaus was a prominent Pontic general during the First Mithridatic War (89 BC-85 BC). In 88 BC as a part of the First Mithridatic War, Archelaus and his brother were involved in a military campaign with the Pontic army against King Nicomedes IV of Bithynia. On the Amnias River the brothers had the command of the advance guard and won their first victory of the war. Neoptolemus then went on to defeat a Roman-led army at Protopachium, probably without his brother. Archelaus was next involved in Mithridates VI’s successful military campaign in conquering most of the Roman Province of Asia. Archelaus had attacked a city called Magnesia ad Sipylum or Magnesia on the Maeander. This attack failed and Archelaus was wounded in the fighting.

In the late summer or autumn of 88 BC or perhaps in 87 BC, Mithridates VI had given Archelaus the command of his large fleet and army to conquer Athens. Archelaus and the Pontic army were sent to Greece, in response to the Athenians wanting to break free from Roman rule and Mithridates VI wanting to conquer them. On their way to Athens, Archelaus captured the Cyclades Islands and the Greek island of Delos. When Archelaus and the Pontic army arrived in Athens, they occupied Piraeus. After occupying Athens the Pontic army spent three days unsuccessfully fighting Quintus Bruttius Sura, a legate to the propraetor of Macedonia Gaius Sentius, with his small detachment of Roman soldiers. Archelaus and Bruttius' forces battled thrice at Chaeronea before the Mithridatic host was defeated and repulsed, marking the first successful Roman engagement against the armies of Mithridates VI.

The presence of the Pontic army under the command of Archelaus encouraged citizens from Southern Greece to revolt against Roman rule. When the Roman general Sulla finally arrived and took control of Macedon at the helm of a large army, replacing Bruttius, Archelaus and the Pontic army withdrew from Boeotia, pulling back to Athens. They fortified themselves in Piraeus and left the city of Athens to Aristion the Athenian tyrant. Mithridates VI had sent his son Arcathius and a much larger Pontic army to Greece to assist Archelaus. As Arcathius was advancing through Northern Greece, Archelaus made several failed attempts to get supplies into Athens. On March 1, 86 BC, Sulla and his legions finally broke into Athens. By that time, Arcathius had died on his way to Athens. His army however was still intact and pursuing the remnants of the legions of Macedonia. Archelaus’ ally the Athenian tyrant Aristion had escaped into the Acropolis of Athens. Archelaus and his Athenian allies lost control of Piraeus and Athens; they were pushed back to the peninsula of Munichia. Archelaus took the Pontic army and joined the remaining forces in Thessaly, taking command at Thermopylae.

Sulla moved to Boeotia to face Archelaus. Their two armies clashed at Battle of Chaeronea in 86 BC, where Archelaus was completely defeated. Archelaus escaped to Chalcis where he received 80,000 reinforcements from Mithridates VI. As Sulla lacked a Roman fleet, Archelaus carried out raids around the Greek coast, even destroying some of Sulla’s transports carrying the advance guard of Sulla’s replacement. Eventually Sulla faced Archelaus at Orchomenus in 86/85 BC. After a two-day battle, Archelaus was decisively defeated by the Romans. After the defeat, he was forced to hide two days in the swamps of Lake Copais, before once again managing to escape to Chalcis.

When Mithridates VI heard the news of the disastrous defeats, he ordered Archelaus to make peace with Sulla. On the conclusion of the peace conference between Mithridates VI and Sulla in late 86 BC, Archelaus suggested that Sulla recognise the status quo in Asia and in return Mithridates VI would ally with him against his enemies in Rome. Sulla, who was adept at such negotiations, responded to Archelaus by inviting him to surrender his fleet and become an ally of Rome.

The final terms of Sulla were that Mithridates VI should surrender part of the Pontic fleet and all conquered territory in Asia and pay an indemnity of 2,000 talents, in return for becoming a friend and ally of Rome. Archelaus remained with Sulla while these terms were sent to Mithridates VI. Archelaus was beginning to worry about his reputation in Pontus as he was getting closer to Sulla and accompanied him on a campaign against the Thracians. Archelaus received from Sulla large estates in Greece, including 6,600 acres of land in Boeotia, and was referred to as a friend and ally of the Roman people. At some point he visited Rome, where he was honored by the Roman Senate. His Pontic fleet withdrew and left Greece. Archelaus was able to persuade Mithridates VI to meet Sulla. Mithridates VI met Sulla and agreed to the Sulla's terms, except for the surrender of his fleet and evacuation of Paphlagonia. Sometime afterwards, Archelaus fell out of favor with Mithridates VI, who believed that Archelaus had made too many concessions to Sulla. Archelaus assisted the Romans in the Second Mithridatic War and Lucius Licinius Lucullus in the Third Mithridatic War.

Archelaus had married an unnamed Greek woman, possibly a Pontic princess, one of the daughters of Mithridates VI. His wife bore Archelaus two sons:

- Archelaus – who became the high priest of the temple-state of Comana, Cappadocia.
- Diogenes - he had served in the army of Mithridates VI.

== Family tree of Archelaus ==
Laodice	Mithridates VI king of Pontus
(illeg.) daughter	Archelaus general
Cleopatra of Pontus ∞ Tigranes II of Armenia	1.Greek woman	Archelaus I priest-king of Comana; 63-55 BC	2.Berenice IV daughter of Ptolemy XII Auletes	5.Cleopatra VII queen of Egypt	Mark Antony triumvir ∞ 2.Antonia Hybrida	4.Octavia the Younger
Artabasdes II king of Armenia; 55-34 BC	(1) Archelaus II priest-king of Comana; 55-47 BC	Glaphyra (hetaera)	Pythodoros of Tralles wealthy Greek	(2) Antonia Prima	(4) Antonia the Elder	(4) Antonia the Younger
1.princess of Armenia	Archelaus king of Cappadocia; 36 BC -17 AD	2.Pythodoris queen of Pontus	Polemon I king of Pontus	G. D. Ahenobarbus	Germanicus	Claudius; Roman Emperor
(1) Archelaus prince	Alexander prince of Judaea	(1) Glaphyra of Cappadocia ∞ 1.Alexander of Judea; 2.Juba II of Numidia; 3.Herod Archelaus	Juba II king of Numidia 30-25 BC, of Mauretania 25-23 ∞ 1.Cleopatra Selene II; 2.Glaphyra of Cappadocia	(5) Cleopatra Selene II	Nero; Roman Emperor	Caligula; Roman Emperor
Tigranes V king of Armenia; 6-12	Alexander prince	Ptolemy king of Mauretania; 20-40	Julia

== Sources ==
- Appian, Mithrid 30, 49, 56, 64
- Plutarch, Sulla 11, 16-19, 20, 23; Lucullus, 8
- Smith, William, ed. (1870). "Archelaus [10]". Dictionary of Greek and Roman Biography and Mythology.
- Archelaus, Pontic General fl.89–83 BC. History of War
- Egyptian Royal Genealogy - Ptolemaic Dynasty, 2005 by Chris Bennett
- A. Dodson & D. Hilton, Complete Royal Families of Ancient Egypt, London: Thames & Hudson, 2004. MCL 932 Dod
- A. Wagner, Pedigree and Progress, Essays in the Genealogical Interpretation of History, London, Philmore, 1975. Rutgers Alex CS4.W33.
- H. Temporini and W. Haase, Aufstieg und Niedergang der römischen Welt: Geschichte und Kultur Roms im spiegel der neueren Forschung, de Gruyter, 1977
- D. Dueck, H. Lindsay and S. Pothecary, Strabo’s cultural geography: the making of a kolossourgia, Cambridge University Press, 2005
- A. Mayor, The Poison King: the life and legend of Mithradates, Rome’s deadliest enemy, Princeton University Press, 2009
- Chisholm, Hugh, ed. (1911). "Archelaus of Cappadocia s.v." . Encyclopædia Britannica. Vol. 2 (11th ed.). Cambridge University Press. pp. 361–362.
