= Julia (wife of Sulla) =

Roman noblewoman (c. 129 BC – c. 104 BC)

Julia, or possibly Ilia (c. 129 BC – c. 104 BC), was a Roman noblewoman who was the first wife of Sulla, later a Roman dictator.

== Biography ==
Little is known of her life and sources are confused as to whether her name was Julia or Ilia. There is no satisfactory identification for her. If Julia is correct, she could have been a daughter of Lucius Julius Caesar and Popillia, therefore a sister of future consul Lucius Julius Caesar and Gaius Julius Caesar Strabo. It is also possible that she was a daughter of Gaius Julius Caesar (grandfather of Caesar). Around 110 BC, while both were young, Julia married Sulla. A marital connection to the Julii Caesares may have served Sulla in his political life, as when he was chosen to serve under Gaius Marius in the Jugurthine War. Julia and Sulla had a daughter, Cornelia, who later was active in Roman society, and a son, Lucius, who died young. Julia apparently died young, maybe in childbirth, and Sulla married his second wife, Aelia.

== Cultural depictions ==
In the historical novel, The First Man in Rome by Colleen McCullough she is a character called Julilla who is portrayed as the younger sister of the Julia, the wife of Marius, her husband's mortal enemy. Julilla commits suicide after learning of the relationship between her husband Sulla and the actor Metrobius.

== See also ==
- Julia gens
- Julii Caesares
- Rhea Silvia, also called Ilia
