= Cornelia (wife of Livianus) =

1st century BC daughter of Lucius Cornelius Sulla

- Spouses: Quintus Pompeius Rufus (m. 88 BC; d. 88 BC); Mamercus Aemilius Lepidus Livianus (m. 77 BC; d. 62 BC)
- Children: Quintus Pompeius Rufus; Pompeia; Aemilia Lepida
- Parents: Sulla (father); Julia (mother)

Cornelia Sulla or Cornelia Silla was the eldest daughter of the Roman statesman and general Lucius Cornelius Sulla and his first wife Julia.

== Biography ==
=== Early life ===
It is believed that she was Sulla's daughter by his first wife Julia. She likely had a full brother named Lucius Cornelius Sulla who died young. Her mother died while she was young, and her father would remarry four times, from these marriages Cornelia had three siblings; Faustus Cornelius Sulla, Fausta Cornelia and Cornelia Postuma.

=== Marriages ===
Cornelia married Quintus Pompeius Rufus, the son of Sulla's consular colleague in 88 BC, Quintus Pompeius Rufus. The marriage produced two children, Pompeia (who became Julius Caesar's second or third wife) and Quintus Pompeius Rufus. Her husband was killed during a riot led by the tribune Publius Sulpicius Rufus in 88 BC. She remarried Mamercus Aemilius Lepidus Livianus, who became consul in 77 BC, a year after the death of Sulla.

Violent upheavals soon ensued out of the ongoing rivalry between Sulla and his former mentor the ageing Gaius Marius. In 86 BC, while Sulla was in Asia Minor pursuing his war against King Mithridates VI of Pontus, he was stripped of his imperium by Marius and his colleagues, and forced into exile.

Cornelia and her new husband took rapid steps to safeguard Sulla's estates from the resulting mock trials and proscriptions during Marius's seventh consulship. She then joined her father in exile.

== In popular culture ==
Cornelia appears in Colleen McCullough's series, Masters of Rome.

== See also ==
- Cornelia (gens)
