= Cornelia Postuma =

Daughter of Sulla

Cornelia Postuma or Postuma Cornelia (born 78 or 77 BC) was the only daughter of Roman dictator Sulla and his fifth wife, Valeria Messalla. She was Sulla's fifth and final known child. (Note: Three surviving children from her father Lucius Cornelius Sulla Felix's previous marriages are known; Cornelia Silla, Faustus Cornelius Sulla and Fausta Cornelia, but another son who died young is attested to by Sulla's autobiography.)

== Life ==
Postuma was delivered some months after Sulla's death. It is uncertain whether her name, Postuma, was a praenomen or cognomen, as the usage of the name Postuma as a female praenomen is unattested in epigraphical evidence for the Roman Republic period but it would have been unusual to give a cognomen at such an early date. The male-equivalent praenomen Postumus is well attested. Her birth was highly significant, as it unified Sulla's family with that of her mother's.

She had three surviving older half-siblings – Cornelia Silla and the twins Faustus Cornelius Sulla and Fausta Cornelia – as well as a half-brother who died young. Her oldest sister, Silla, had already had children by the time Postuma was born.

T. F. Carney presumes that she died young since there is no further mention of her in literature; he states that a member of such a notorious household could not have failed to be mentioned somewhere if she had been old enough to marry. He assumes both she and her half-brother died in congenital infection, perhaps contracted by her mother from Sulla, who himself died of infected ulcers.

== Cultural depictions ==
In Colleen McCullough's book Fortune's Favourites Postuma's mother Valeria expresses doubt that she is actually Sulla's child, believing that she was instead fathered by her lover Metrobius.

== See also ==
- Posthumously born notable people
- List of Roman women
- Roman naming conventions for females

== Bibliography ==
- Carney, Thomas F (1961). "The death of Sulla". Acta Classica: Proceedings of the Classical Association of South Africa. 4 (1): 64–79. JSTOR 24591114.
- Kajava, Mika (1995). "Roman Female Praenomina: Studies in the Nomenclature of Roman Women". Acta Instituti Romani Finlandiae. Institutum Romanum Finlandiae. ISSN 0538-2270.
