= Gaius Memmius (praetor 58 BC) =

Roman politician, orator and poet

- Born: c. 99 BC
- Died: c. 49 BC
- Spouse: Fausta Cornelia
- Children: Gaius Memmius
- Father: Lucius Memmius

Gaius Memmius (c. 99 – c. 49 BC, incorrectly called Gemellus, "The Twin") was a Roman politician, orator and poet. He is most famous as the dedicatee of Lucretius' De Rerum Natura, and for his appearances in the poetry of Catullus.

== Life and career ==
Memmius was born around 99 BC, a member of the prominent plebeian gens Memmia. His father was Lucius Memmius, possibly the same Lucius Memmius who served as triumvir monetalis in 109 BC.

Memmius first appears in the historical record as a Tribune of the Plebs for 66 BC, in which role he prosecuted Marcus Lucullus for his actions as quaestor under the rule of Sulla. More significantly, as Pompey the Great assumed command of the Roman armies in the Third Mithridatic War in the same year, Memmius led the opposition to Marcus Lucullus' brother, Lucius Licinius Lucullus, whom Pompey had replaced. Memmius, an ally of Pompey's both politically and through family connections, charged Lucullus with embezzlement and needlessly protracting the war, and led the campaign against granting Lucullus a triumph. He gave at least four public speeches against Lucullus' triumph; after three years, the necessary law (lex curiata) was passed, but Lucullus had been forced to remain outside the pomerium throughout this period to avoid forfeiting his right to a triumph by entering Rome, effectively removing him from politics for this period.

Memmius served as praetor in 58 BC, during which year he and his colleague Lucius Domitius Ahenobarbus raised an inquiry into Caesar's conduct during his consulship in the previous year, though the Senate refused to act upon it. In 57–56 BC, he was a propraetorial governor in Bithynia and Pontus. His staff included the young poets Catullus and Helvius Cinna; on his return to Rome, Catullus wrote verses complaining of how Memmius denied his staff the expected opportunities to enrich themselves at the locals' expense. His son Gaius Memmius later issued coins celebrating the elder Memmius as imperator, a title perhaps granted to him during this governorship.

While at first a strong supporter of Pompey, by 54 BC Cicero described Memmius as having gone over to Caesar, Pompey's great rival, and 'being supported by all of Caesar's influence' in his campaign for the consulship of that year, as well as being popular among Caesar's soldiers. However, following his defeat to Lucius Domitius Ahenobarbus, also supported by Caesar, and Appius Claudius Pulcher, an ally of Pompey's, Memmius revealed in the Senate an alleged compact between the victorious consuls, himself and his fellow Caesarian candidate Gnaeus Domitius Calvinus that, if elected, Domitius and Memmius would falsify a lex curiata and a decree for the allocation of senatorial provinces. Cicero records that this lost Memmius Caesar's favour, and that Memmius went on to prosecute Domitius himself.

In 52 BC, now without a powerful ally, he was prosecuted along with others under the lex Pompeia de ambitu for taking and offering bribes during his consular election campaign. Since the same law offered amnesty to anybody who brought a successful prosecution under it, Memmius then accused Metellus Scipio, Pompey's own father-in-law, of the same offence. However, Pompey publicly interceded on Metellus Scipio's behalf, calling all of the jurors to himself and putting on mourning garb in the traditional solicitation of sympathy and support, which led Memmius to withdraw his charge and go into exile in Athens.

In the first half of 51 BC, while in Athens, Memmius bought an estate on which were the ruins of Epicurus' house, and secured authorisation from the Areopagus to tear them down and build on the site. The Epicureans, through their leader Patro, appealed to Cicero to intercede with Memmius, and Cicero wrote to him asking him to return the ruined house to the Epicureans. Memmius left Athens for Mytilene the day before Cicero's arrival, but a later letter of Cicero's claimed success in at least persuading Memmius to abandon his plan of constructing the new house.

According to Cicero, Memmius seduced the wife of Marcus Lucullus early in 60 BC, leading to the latter's divorce from her. Shortly after his failed prosecution of Metellus in 52 BC, he attempted to seduce Pompey's wife, Cornelia, by a letter, delivered by Curtias Nicias, which Cornelia revealed to her husband. Prior to this, along with Pompey, Memmius had been instrumental in gaining Roman citizenship for Nicias, but in the fallout from the affair Pompey banished Nicias from his house.

Memmius died, possibly having been recalled to Rome and restored to the Senate in 50 BC, a proposal made by the tribune Gaius Scribonius Curio, around 49 BC. If he lived as long as 49 BC, he would have been permitted to return by Caesar's recall of the exiles from 52, but there is no record either way of whether this affected him.

== Literary works and patronage ==
According to Ovid's Tristia, published around AD 10, approximately sixty years after Memmius' death, Memmius was the author of erotic poems. None survive, but Ovid alleges that 'among his works he names disgraceful things, and disgrace itself'. While Ovid passes over the specifics of what Memmius may have written, he names him alongside several other poets, such as Catullus, Calvus and Tibullus, whose poems claimed to discuss their own extra-marital relationships, which suggests that Memmius' work may have treated a similar subject-matter.

Ovid's mention of Memmius alongside known and respected poets of the recent past may suggest that his work was well regarded after his death. It was certainly known and referenced by Pliny the Younger at the end of the 1st century AD, who cites Memmius' name in defence of his own composition of poetry considered to be vulgar. In the early 2nd century AD, Aulus Gellius wrote that 'rather many Greeks' considered Memmius' work to be durus ('hard', in the sense of 'unrefined'), in unfavourable contrast to that of Catullus and Cinna.

According to the Encyclopædia Britannica Eleventh Edition, Cicero praised him as possessing considerable oratorical abilities, but judged that his contempt for Latin letters and preference for Greek models impaired his efficiency as an advocate.

Memmius's most direct impact on Roman literature stems from his position as the dedicatee of Lucretius' didactic poem De rerum natura, in which the poet claims the purpose of converting Memmius to Epicurean philosophy and physics. Memmius' relationship to Lucretius is unclear: he has variously been argued as a potential patron of the poet and his work, a speculative addressee whom Lucretius considered 'desperately needed conversion from a life of political ambition to the one of philosophical detachment', and as a famously-corrupt political figure whom Lucretius chose to make 'the butt of his mocking exhortations.'

Similarly, Memmius' relationship to Epicureanism is debated. While the general view is that Memmius was a "reluctant student" of Lucretius' Epicurean ideas, if broadly sympathetic to its basic ideals, it has also been argued that Memmius may have been a practising Epicurean, whose quarrel with the Athenian Epicureans stemmed from a personal dislike of that group and their interpretation of the philosophy.

== Family ==
Gaius Memmius was married to Fausta Cornelia, the daughter of Lucius Cornelius Sulla. They had at least one son, Gaius Memmius, suffect consul in 34 BC. In 55 BC, Memmius divorced Fausta on the grounds of adultery, which helped to repair his rift with Caesar.

His sister Memmia was married to Gaius Scribonius Curio. This made Memmius the uncle of the younger Gaius Scribonius Curio, who would be killed in 49 BC fighting under Julius Caesar.

The fact that Gaius Memmius did not share his father's praenomen (Lucius) would suggest that he had at least one elder brother, probably called Lucius Memmius, since it was usual for the eldest son of a family to inherit the father's name. However, this putative brother does not appear in the historical record.

== Bibliography ==
- Farrell, Joseph (2020). "11: Was Memmius a Good King?". In O'Rourke, Donncha (ed.). Approaches to Lucretius: Traditions and Innovations in Reading the De Rerum Natura. Cambridge University Press. pp. 219–240.
- Hogan, Patrick (2006). "Curtias Nicias". Lexicon of Greek Grammarians of Antiquity. Brill.
- Salway, Brent (1994). "What's In a Name? A Survey of Roman Onomastic Practice from c. 700 B.C. to A.D. 700". Journal of Roman Studies. 84: 124–145. doi:10.2307/300873. JSTOR 300873.
- Zmeskal, K. (2009). Adfinitas: die Verwandtschaften der senatorischen Führungsschicht der römischen Republik von 218-31 v. Chr. Cambridge: Cambridge University Press.
