= Nicopolis (courtesan) =

Roman courtesan of 2nd century BC

Nicopolis (born c.150 BC) was a Roman hetaira of possible Greek origin.

She was likely a former slave from Greece, who earned her fortune as a prostitute. Ernst Badian suggests that Nicopolis was not her real name.

She is foremost known as the alleged lover and benefactor of the young Sulla, who was younger than her. She was an independently rich woman by the time Sulla became her lover. They had a long term relationship. After her death, she left him her fortune. Their relationship, and the benefit of her fortune on his career, has often been referred to in the history of Sulla. Her fortune in combination with that of his stepmother, helped Sulla on his way in his political career.

She is a character The First Man in Rome by Colleen McCullough.

== See also ==
- Metrobius

== Bibliography ==
- Ernst Badian, Lucius Sulla, The Deadly Reformer, Sydney University Press, 1970. ISBN 0424060906
