= Triumvir monetalis =

Moneyers during the Roman Republic and Empire

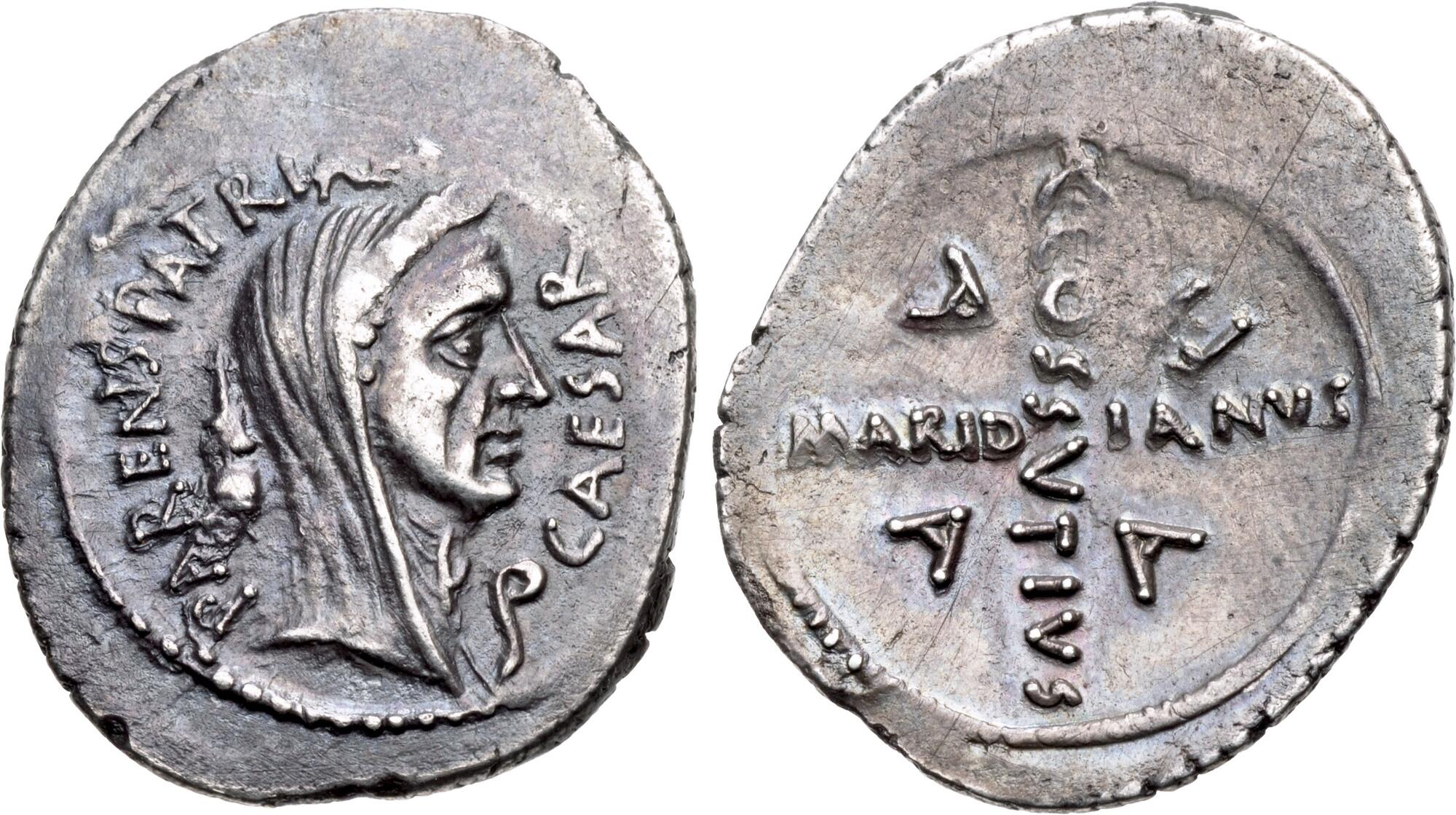
Denarius of C. Cossutius Maridianus, 44 BC, with the head of Julius Caesar on the obverse. The legend on the reverse mentions A. A. A. F. F..

The triumvir monetalis (pl. tresviri or triumviri monetales, also called the triumviri (tresviri) aere argento auro flando feriundo, abbreviated IIIVIR A. A. A. F. F.) was a moneyer during the Roman Republic and the Empire, who oversaw the minting of coins. In that role, he would be responsible for the "ordinary coinage" during the republican period (contrasted to extraordinary coinage, usually minted by other magistrates, done on an ad hoc basis). Roman moneyers almost always acted together as a board of three, hence their title triumvir.

Over the course of the late Republic from 139 BC onwards, the moneyers started to mint more personalised coins which advertised their lineages, achievements of ancestors, and other leaders. From Caesar's dictatorship onwards, however, their freedom to do so diminished, before the empire's emergence coincided with the minting only of coins depicting the emperor and the imperial family.

The office continued into the imperial period as an administrative post.

== Duties and selection ==
During the Republic, the position was held mostly by young men from senatorial families who were embarking on political careers. The three served for one year and formed part of the vigintisexviri, a group of 26 minor magistrates.

From the start, the position was annual, but there is disagreement between scholars on whether they were elected or appointed. Michael Crawford thinks the moneyers were elected by the Roman citizenry, even though this magistracy did not grant them admission to the Senate. Andrew Burnett suggests instead that they were appointed by the consuls, having noticed a significant number of familial connections between moneyers and consuls of the same year.

Every year, the Senate required the production of a number of coins, then the quaestors (the main financial magistrates) transferred the amount of precious metal needed to produce the coins to the moneyers. Most of the time, the moneyers took turns to mint and only one was active at a time, which means that some moneyers never struck coins as their colleagues had already produced the required number of coins. It also explains the sometimes large differences between the production volumes of moneyers of the same year, as the first moneyer struck most of the coins. The order between moneyers likely depended on their social status; men from senatorial families were first to strike. Apart from aristocrats, a good number of moneyers were chosen for their expertise in banking and trade, such as Lucius Minucius, member of a family of businessmen active in Asia, or Lucius Axsius Naso, known as banker in the 70s BC.

== History ==
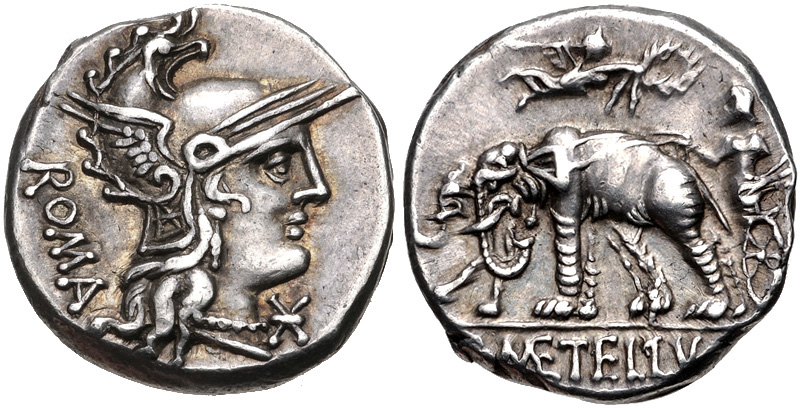
Denarius of C. Caecilius Metellus Caprarius, 125 BC. The reverse shows the triumph of Lucius Metellus after his victory at Panormus in 251 BC.

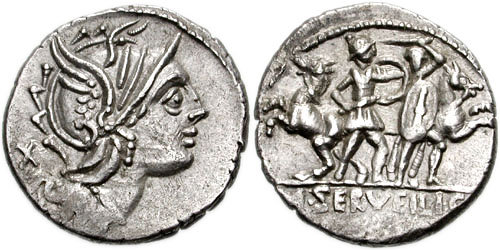
Denarius of Marcus Servilius, c. 100 BC. The reverse features a duel of his ancestor Pulex Geminus.

The triumviri monetales were probably established with, or soon after, the creation of the monetary system based on the denarius, circa 211 BC. The censors supervised coinage before that date, but they perhaps lost this competence because of the decline in quality of the last issues of quadrigati.

Romans initially produced coin types that remained identical over long periods of time; the goal was to issue public types in the manner of Greek city-states (as with the Owl of Athenian coins). The first Roman coins typically feature gods, the personification of Roma, and the Dioscuri, with often a specific god for each denomination. During the Second Punic War (218 – 202 BC), several magistrates with imperium struck coins while on campaign, which they signed with an abbreviation of their name or their location; this practice was soon adopted by the moneyers, who exclusively minted in Rome (the first issues in Rome had hitherto been anonymous). The purpose of this measure was to identify the magistrate responsible for every coin, in order to ensure a standard quality. The moneyers' signatures were either monograms, or a symbol hinting to their name, or a combination of both. For example, in 208 BC, Gnaeus Cornelius Dolabella signed an as with the letters CN DO and a pickaxe, the meaning of his cognomen in Latin (dolabella). This practice of signing coins progressively made the moneyers consider coins as their personal production rather than that of the city of Rome, as with seals.

=== From 139 BC ===
The coinage of the Roman Republic changed dramatically in 139 BC after the vote of the lex Gabinia, which provided secret ballots for the elections of magistrates. The nobility could no longer use their traditional means of influencing the crowd, and ambitious individuals started to use coinage for self-advertisement. By now moneyers diverted from the traditional type of the head of Roma on the obverse and either the Dioscuri or a god driving a chariot on the reverse. They instead chose themes related to victory (with laurels, trophies, or the goddess Victoria) or the duties of the aedile (distribution of corn and public games). From 123 BC, older types returned for about ten years, probably because of legislation against immoderate ambition passed in 124, but personal types resumed for good in 115 BC.

From these years, moneyers often used imagery related to their ancestors' achievements, such as victories or bravery in battle. They also put down their claim to a mythical ancestry, such as the denarii of Lucius Pomponius Molo in 97 BC who claimed to descend from Numa, the second king of Rome through his son Pompo.

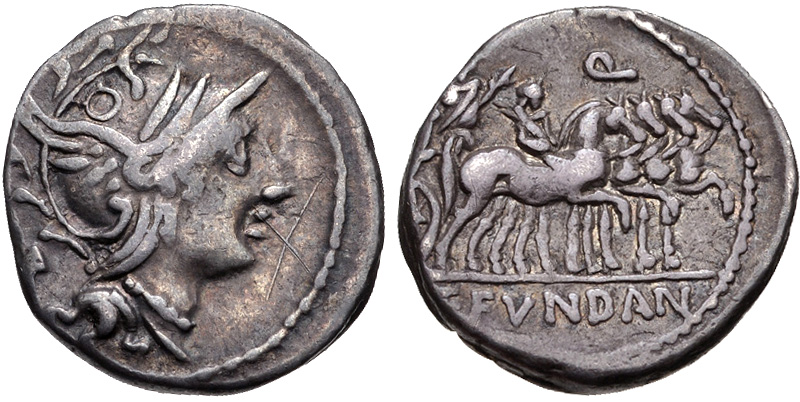
Denarius of Gaius Fundanius, 101 BC. The reverse depicts Gaius Marius as triumphator in a chariot; the young man on horseback is probably his son.

In 101 BC, Gaius Fundanius pictured the triumph of Marius on his denarius, the first time a living person appeared on a Roman coin. Most moneyers of the period of Marius' dominance likewise minted coins with themes related to their leader. Because of the Social War and the civil wars of the 80s BC, a huge amount of denarii were produced during the period. Apollo was the most common theme of the decade, perhaps due to his association with liberty.

In the late 80s, Sulla was the first Roman general to strike coins on his own to finance his rebellion against the Republic, as well as the first to strike an aureus. After his victory, Sulla struck coins highlighting his claim to descend from Venus, but unlike Marius, he mostly let moneyers display their own themes. A new innovation occurred in 54 BC with the denarius of Quintus Pompeius Rufus, who picked the head of his grandfathers Sulla and Rufus, which was followed by several other moneyers.

=== Personal coinage in decline ===
After the arrival in Rome of Julius Caesar in 49 BC, the moneyers could initially make personal types, but from 46 onwards their production was almost entirely devoted to Caesar's propaganda, with types related to Venus (Caesar's tutelar goddess), Victoria, Fortuna, or honours he received. In 44 BC, Julius Caesar temporarily increased the number of moneyers to four – therefore becoming quadrumviri – for political reasons, they minted denarii with the head of Caesar, the first time a living Roman had his portrait on a coin, in the manner of an Hellenistic monarch. The moneyers of the years following the assassination of Caesar mostly struck personal types again, but their production was gradually marginalised by the members of the Second Triumvirate (Octavian, Mark Antony, and Lepidus), who had their own dynastic coinage with their portraits. The last full college of moneyers minted coins in 41 BC; in 40 and 39, only one monetalis could actually issue his own coins before vanishing completely.

After Octavian defeated Antony at the Battle of Actium in 30 BC, he restored the appearance of the Republic and moneyers could strike their own coins again for a few years. But, thereafter, coins from imperial mints only mention the emperor and his family. Numerous inscriptions during the Empire indicate that the office continued to administer coin production.

== Name ==
The triumviri monetales derived their title from the Roman mint's location in the temple of Juno Moneta ("Juno the Advisor" or "Warner"). In time, the mint gave the goddess's epithet the additional connotation of "related to money", which became the source of the English word money.

== See also ==
- List of Roman moneyers during the Republic
- Quaestor
- Moneyer
- Other triumvirs
