= Fausta Cornelia =

Daughter of the Roman Dictator Sulla

- Spouse(s): Gaius Memmius; Titus Annius Milo
- Children: Gaius Memmius
- Parents: Sulla (father); Caecilia Metella (mother)

Fausta Cornelia (also called Cornelia Fausta) was a daughter of the Roman Dictator Sulla.

== Biography ==
=== Early life ===
Fausta and her twin brother Faustus were the children of their father's fourth wife Caecilia Metella. They had one older half-sister, Cornelia, and a younger half-sister named Cornelia Postuma. She and her brother were both raised by their father's good friend Lucullus.

=== Marriages ===
Several men were interested in marrying Fausta, among them Quintus Pompeius Macula, a friend of Cicero who had an intense rivalry with a Fulvius for her hand, but she ultimately married the poet Gaius Memmius. They had one son together, also named Gaius Memmius. The marriage with Memmius went sour as he started to develop a disdain for her former guardian Lucullus and his family, in the end it was Fausta who paid the price as he divorced her soon after. After this she went on to marry Titus Annius Milo.

She possibly cheated on Milo, as the historian Sallust was prosecuted for adultery with her. However, unfaithfulness was common in Rome, and such a slight against good morals might have otherwise gone unrecorded had she, Milo and Sallust not all three been distinguished persons. The event seemingly did not dissuade her from further affairs, as a man named Villius was caught and beaten by Milo for having slept with Fausta.

== Cultural depictions ==
Fausta appears as a major character in the SPQR series by John Maddox Roberts.

== See also ==
- Women in ancient Rome
