= Gaius Julius Caesar Strabo =

Roman senator, orator and poet (c. 131 – 87 BC)

Gaius Julius Caesar Strabo "Vopiscus" (c. 131 – 87 BC) was the younger son of Lucius Julius Caesar and his wife Popillia, and younger brother of Lucius Julius Caesar, consul in 90 BC. His cognomen 'Strabo' indicates he was possibly cross-eyed, and the nickname 'Vopiscus' suggests he was a surviving member of a set of twins.

In 103 BC, he was on a committee to supervise the implementation of the Lex frumentaria, an agrarian bill, proposed by tribune Lucius Appuleius Saturninus. Strabo became a pontifex in 99 BC; a quaestor in 96 BC and an aedile in 90 BC.

In the midst of the Social War, Strabo stood for the consulship even though he had not yet been praetor. His candidacy was rejected by tribunes Publius Sulpicius Rufus and Publius Antistius, which led to street clashes in December 89 BC. After Strabo was dismissed Sulla and Quintus Pompeius Rufus were elected consuls for 88 BC.

Along with his brother he was killed in the streets by partisans of Marius following the civil war in 87 BC. According to Livy, their heads were exposed on the speaker's platform.

Caesar Strabo Vopiscus wrote at least three tragedies with Greek themes. These plays were Adrastus, Tecmesa and Teutras. Only fragments of the plays survive. According to Cicero, he was an orator known for his wit and humour. Cicero published a dialogue called De Oratore, in which Strabo explains why humour is important in speech.

He was an uncle to Lucius Julius Caesar (consul in 64 BC), Julia, and a great-uncle to Mark Antony.
