= Pompeia (wife of Caesar) =

Second or third wife of Julius Caesar

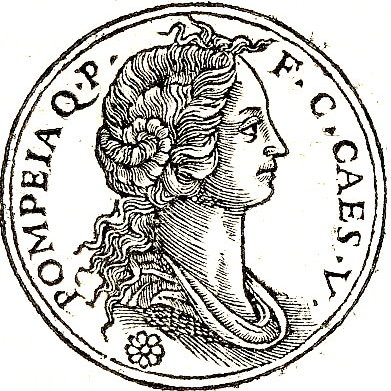
- Pompeia from Promptuarium Iconum Insigniorum
- Born: Rome
- Died: Rome
- Known for: The second or third wife of Julius Caesar
- Spouse(s): Julius Caesar (67–62 BC; divorced)
- Parents: Quintus Pompeius Rufus (father); Cornelia (mother)

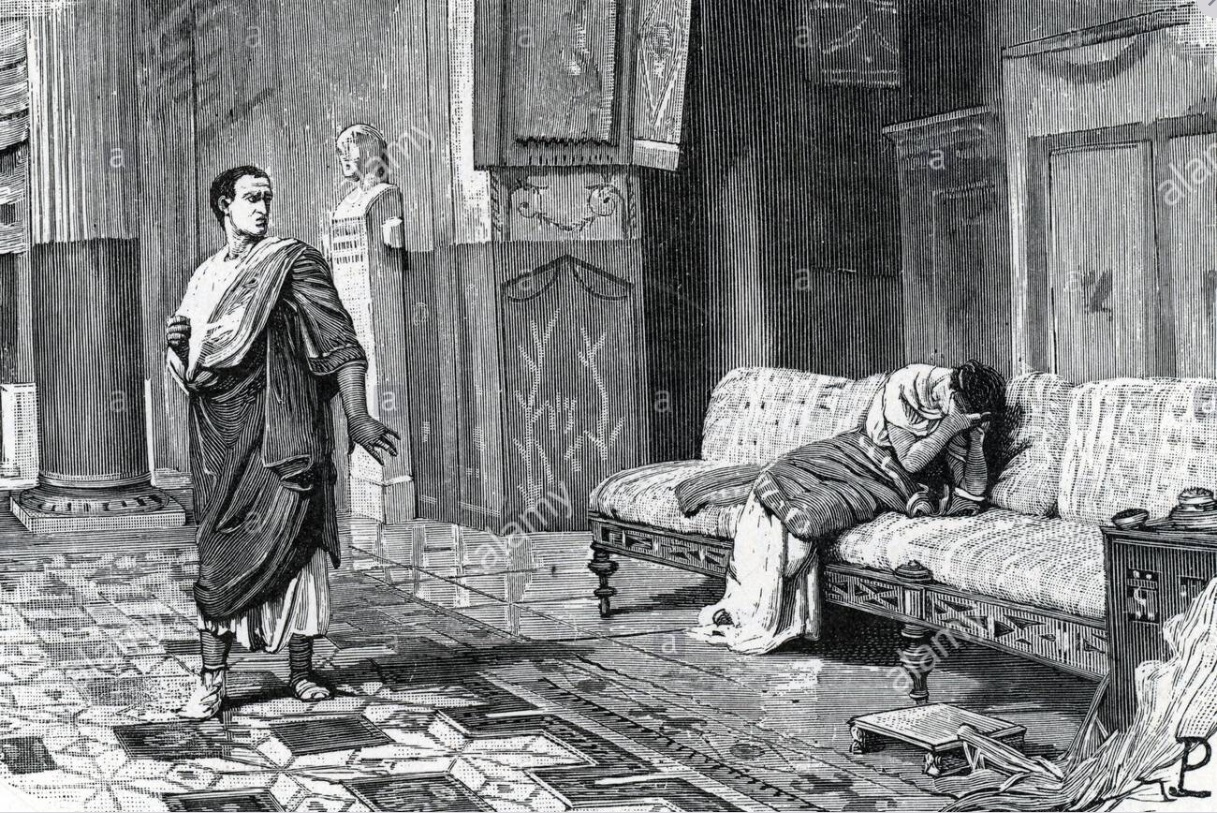
Caesar repudiates Pompeia Sulla (illustration by Francesco Bertolini)

Pompeia (fl. 1st century BC) was either the second or third (Note: Plutarch refers to Pompeia, Cornelia's successor, as Caesar's third wife, implying that Cornelia was his second, implying that Cossutia, to whom he had been betrothed to since childhood, was his first.) wife of Julius Caesar. Pompeia's parents were Quintus Pompeius Rufus, a son of a former consul, and Cornelia, the daughter of the Roman dictator Sulla. Caesar married Pompeia in 67 BC, after he had served as quaestor in Hispania, his first wife Cornelia having died in 69 BC.

In 63 BC, Caesar was elected to the position of the Pontifex Maximus, the chief priest of the Roman state religion, which came with an official residence on the Via Sacra. In 62 BC, Pompeia hosted there the festival of the Bona Dea ("good goddess"), which no man was permitted to attend. However, a young patrician named Publius Clodius Pulcher managed to gain admittance disguised as a woman, apparently for the purpose of seducing Pompeia. He was caught and prosecuted for sacrilege. Caesar gave no evidence against Clodius at his trial, and he was acquitted. Nevertheless, Caesar divorced Pompeia, saying that "my wife ought not even to be under suspicion".

Nothing specific is known about her life after the divorce, but it has been proposed that she may have married Publius Vatinius. Pompeia is depicted in various works of fiction including Robert Harris's Lustrum and Colleen McCullough's Masters of Rome series; in the Masters of Rome series, the theory that she remarried to Publius is depicted.

== Caesar's wife must be above suspicion ==
Caesar's response to the Bona Dea scandal gave rise to a proverb, "Caesar's wife must be above reproach". The phrase is used to highlight the importance of maintaining trust in public figures, and that those in positions of authority should avoid even the implication or appearance of impropriety.

== See also ==
- Pompeia gens
- Caesar's Wife, play named after Pompeia
