= Gaius Memmius (consul 34 BC) =

Roman senator

Gaius Memmius (born c. 70 BC) was a Roman senator who was appointed suffect consul in 34 BC.

== Biography ==
Gaius Memmius was the son of Gaius Memmius. His mother was Fausta Cornelia, thus making him a grandson of controversial Lucius Cornelius Sulla, the former dictator of Rome. A Novus homo, very little is known of his career, and it is unknown whether he was a supporter of Gaius Julius Caesar Octavianus or of Marcus Antonius. He was appointed consul suffectus in 34 BC, replacing Lucius Scribonius Libo. He was later appointed proconsular governor of Asia, sometime after 30 BC. During his tenure as governor, Memmius set up monument honoring himself and three generations of his family, which still survives today. The inscription reads:

C∙MEMMIO∙C∙F∙SULLAE∙FELICIS∙N∙EX∙PEQUNI(A)

which translates as:

To Gaius Memmius, son of Gaius Memmius, grandson of Sulla Felix (paid for this monument) from his own funds.

== Sources ==
- Broughton, T. Robert S., The Magistrates of the Roman Republic, Vol II (1952)
- Syme, Ronald, The Augustan Aristocracy (1986) Clarendon Press
- Mallios Yorgos, Ephesus (Antiquity), Monument of Memmius, Encyclopaedia of the Hellenic World, Asia Minor

Political offices
Preceded by Lucius Sempronius Atratinus, and Lucius Scribonius Libo	Suffect Consul of the Roman Empire; 34 BC with Paullus Aemilius Lepidus	Succeeded by Marcus Herennius Picens, and Paullus Aemilius Lepidus as consules suffecti
