= Sulla =

Roman general and dictator (138–78 BC)

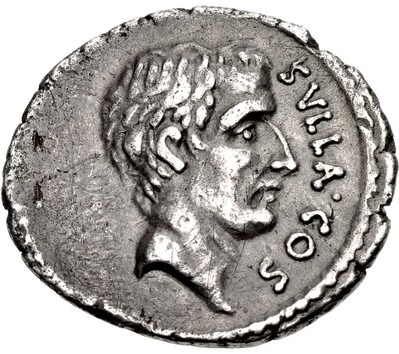
- Portrait of Sulla on a denarius minted in 54 BC by his grandson Pompeius Rufus
- Born: 138 BC
- Died: 78 BC (aged 60); Puteoli, Italy
- Notable credit: Constitutional reforms of Sulla
- Office: Legate during Social War (90–89 BC); Consul (88 BC); Proconsul against Mithridates (87–84 BC); Dictator (82–80 BC); Consul (80 BC)
- Opponent: Gaius Marius
- Spouses: Julia (Ilia?); Aelia; Cloelia; Caecilia; Valeria
- Children: Lucius Cornelius Sulla; Cornelia; Faustus Cornelius Sulla; Cornelia Fausta; Cornelia Postuma
- Military career
- Service years: 107–82 BC
- Wars: Jugurthine War; Cimbrian War; Social War; First Mithridatic War; Sulla's civil war
- Awards: Grass Crown, Roman Triumph

Lucius Cornelius Sulla Felix (/ˈsʌlə/, Latin pronunciation: [ˈɫuːkius kɔrˈneːlius ˈsulːa ˈfeːliːks]; 138–78 BC), commonly known as Sulla, was a Roman general and statesman of the late Roman Republic. He came to prominence for his military exploits and was the first general during the late republic to march on Rome and win a civil war. After purging his opponents, he assumed the dictatorship, sought to strengthen the republican system through constitutional reforms, and resigned his plenary powers after their enactment.

Sulla held the office of consul twice and revived the office of dictator. A gifted general, he achieved successes in wars against foreign and domestic opponents. Sulla rose to prominence during the war against the Numidian king Jugurtha, whom he captured as a result of Jugurtha's betrayal by the king's allies, although his superior Gaius Marius took credit for ending the war. He then fought successfully against Germanic tribes during the Cimbrian War, and Italian allies during the Social War. He was awarded the Grass Crown for his bravery at the Battle of Nola. Sulla was closely associated with Venus, adopting the title Epaphroditos, meaning "favoured of Aphrodite".

Sulla was elected consul for 88 BC; however, amid a dispute over the command of the war against Mithridates of Pontus – initially awarded to Sulla by the Senate but revoked as part of a political deal between Marius and the plebeian tribune Publius Sulpicius – Sulla, as consul, took command of his army and marched on Rome. As a result, Marius, Sulpicius, and several of their allies were violently expelled from the city while the rest were executed. Afterwards, Sulla left with his army at the end of his consular term to fight Mithridates in Greece. During his absence, Marius returned with Lucius Cornelius Cinna (who succeeded Sulla in the consulship) and they purged their opponents from the city, including Sulla, whom they declared a public enemy. In the East, Sulla crushed the Pontic armies at the battles of Chaeronea and Orchomenos (86 BC), but offered a generous peace to Mithridates, so he could return to Rome. Although Marius and Cinna had by this point died, Sulla crushed the successors of their faction and won a decisive victory outside Rome at the Battle of the Colline Gate (82 BC).

Sulla, having seized control of Roman politics, revived the office of dictator, which had been dormant since the Second Punic War more than a century earlier. Even before his dictatorship, he initiated proscriptions to purge his opponents; with his dictatorial powers, he reformed Roman constitutional laws to restore the primacy of the Senate and limit the power of the tribunes of the plebs. He resigned his dictatorship at the start of 80 BC and assumed an ordinary consulship for the rest of the year. After that consulship, Sulla retired to private life and died shortly thereafter in 78 BC. Sulla left a lasting impression on the next generation of leaders, such as Pompey and Julius Caesar, who followed his precedent in using force to attain political power.

== Family and youth ==
Sulla, the son of Lucius Cornelius Sulla and the grandson of Publius Cornelius Sulla, was born into a branch of the patrician gens Cornelia, but his family had fallen to an impoverished condition at the time of his birth. Publius Cornelius Rufinus, one of Sulla's ancestors and also the last member of his family to be consul, was banished from the Senate after having been caught possessing more than 10 pounds of silver plate. Sulla's family thereafter did not reach the highest offices of the state until Sulla himself. His father may have served as praetor; he married twice, giving Sulla a stepmother of considerable wealth, which helped the young man's ambitions.

Stories of Sulla's childhood are much embellished. One story, also likely fictitious, relates that, when Sulla was a baby and his nurse was carrying him around the streets, a strange woman walked up to her and said, "Puer tibi et reipublicae tuae felix", which can be translated as "The boy will be a source of luck to you and your state." After his father's death, around the time Sulla reached adulthood, Sulla found himself impoverished. He may have been disinherited but it is more plausible that there simply was nothing to inherit. Lacking ready money, Sulla spent his youth among Rome's comedians, actors, lute players, and dancers. During these times on the stage, after initially only singing, he started writing comedic plays called Atellan farces. Plutarch mentions that during his last marriage to Valeria, he still kept company with "actresses, musicians, and dancers, drinking with them on couches night and day". Plutarch also singles out the actor Metrobius as one of Sulla's lovers and the one he carried on until the end of his life, when Metrobius himself was, in Plutarch's judgment, "past his prime."

Sulla almost certainly received a normal education for his class, grounded in ancient Greek and Latin classics. Sallust declares him well read, intelligent, and fluent in Greek. Regardless, by the standards of the Roman political class, Sulla was a very poor man. His first wife was called either Ilia or Julia. If the latter, he may have married into the Julii Caesares. He had one child from this union, before his first wife's death. He married again, with a woman called Aelia, of whom nothing is known other than her name. During these marriages, he engaged in an affair with the hetaira Nicopolis, who also was older than him. The means by which Sulla attained the fortune which later would enable him to ascend the ladder of Roman politics are not clear; Plutarch refers to two inheritances, one from his stepmother (who loved him dearly) and the other from his mistress Nicopolis. Arthur Keaveney, a classicist and author of the Sullan biography Sulla: The Last Republican, accepts these inheritances as historical and places them around Sulla's turning thirty years of age.

== Early career ==
After meeting the minimum age requirement of thirty, Sulla stood for the quaestorship in 108 BC. Normally, candidates had to have first served for ten years in the military; however, by Sulla's time, this had been superseded by an age requirement. He was then assigned by lot to serve under the consul Gaius Marius.

=== Jugurthine War, 107–106 BC ===
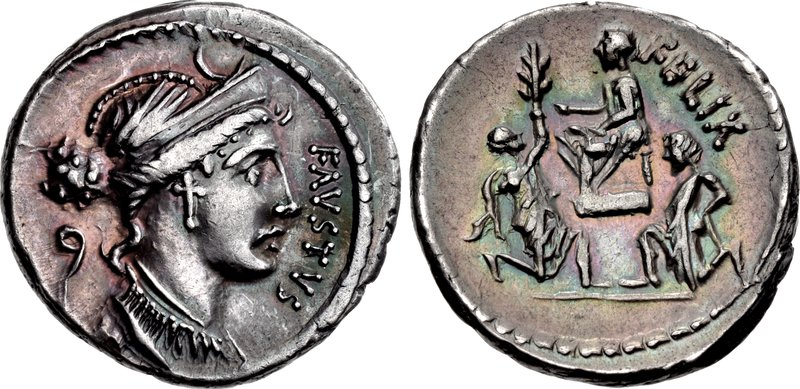
Denarius minted by Sulla's son Faustus in 56 BC. It features the head of Diana on the obverse and the Bocchus monument on the reverse, showing the moment of the capture of Jugurtha. The reverse was also a reproduction of Sulla's first signet ring.

The Jugurthine War had started in 112 BC when Jugurtha, grandson of Massinissa of Numidia, claimed the entire kingdom of Numidia in defiance of Roman decrees that divided it among several members of the royal family. After the massacre of a number of Italian traders who supported one of his rivals, indignation erupted as to Jugurtha's use of bribery to secure a favourable peace treaty; called to Rome to testify on bribery charges, he plotted successfully the assassination of another royal claimant before returning home. After the war started, several Roman commanders were bribed (Bestia and Spurius); and one (Aulus Postumius Albinus) was defeated. In 109, Rome sent Quintus Caecilius Metellus to continue the war. Gaius Marius, a lieutenant of Metellus, returned to Rome to stand for the consulship in 107 BC. Marius was elected consul and, through assignment by tribunician legislation, took over the campaign. Sulla was assigned by lot to his staff.

When Marius took command, he entrusted Sulla with organising cavalry in Italy that would be needed to pursue the mobile Numidians into the desert. If Sulla had married one of the Julii Caesares, this could explain Marius's willingness to entrust such an important task to a young man with no military experience, as Marius too had married into that family.

Under Marius, the Roman forces followed a plan very similar to that of Metellus, capturing and garrisoning fortified positions in the African countryside. Sulla was popular with the men; charming and benign, he built up a healthy rapport while also winning popularity with other officers, including Marius. Ultimately, the Numidians were defeated in 106 BC, due in large part to Sulla's initiative in capturing the Numidian king. Jugurtha had fled to his father-in-law, King Bocchus I of Mauretania (a kingdom to the west of Numidia); Marius invaded Mauretania and, after a pitched battle in which both Sulla and Marius played important roles in securing victory, Bocchus was forced to betray Jugurtha. After the Senate approved negotiations with Bocchus, it delegated the talks to Marius, who appointed Sulla as envoy plenipotentiary. Winning Bocchus's friendship and making plain Rome's demands for Jugurtha's deliverance, Sulla successfully concluded negotiations and secured Bocchus's capture of Jugurtha and the king's rendition to Marius's camp. The publicity attracted by this feat for many years boosted Sulla's reputation and political prospects. Years later, in 91 BC, Bocchus paid for the erection of a gilded equestrian statue depicting Sulla's capture of Jugurtha.

=== Cimbrian War, 104–101 BC ===
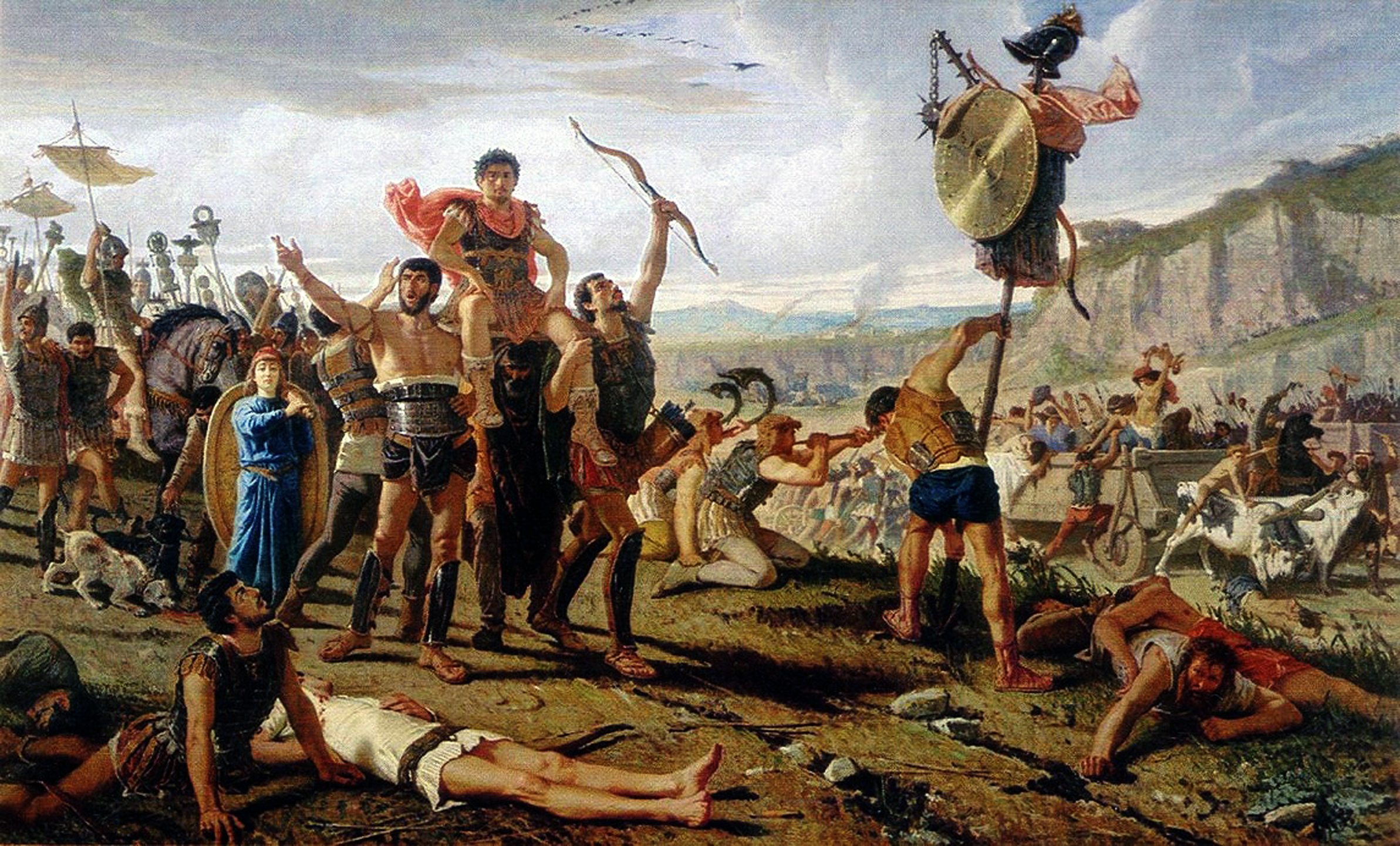
Depiction of Marius as victor over the invading Cimbri.

In 105 BC, the Cimbri and the Teutons, two Germanic tribes who had bested the Roman legions on several occasions, seemed again to be heading for Italy. Marius, in the midst of this military crisis, sought and won repeated consulships, which upset aristocrats in the Senate; it is likely however that they acknowledged the indispensability of Marius's military capabilities in defeating the Germanic invaders. Amid a reorganisation of political alliances, the traditionalists in the Senate raised up Sulla – a patrician, even if a poor one – as a counterweight against the newcomer Marius.

Starting in 104 BC, Marius moved to reform the defeated Roman armies in southern Gaul. Sulla then served as legate under his former commander and, in that stead, successfully subdued a Gallic tribe which revolted in the aftermath of a previous Roman defeat. The next year, Sulla was elected military tribune and served under Marius, and assigned to treat with the Marsi, part of the Germanic invaders, he was able to negotiate their defection from the Cimbri and Teutones. His prospects for advancement under Marius being stalled, however, Sulla started to complain "most unfairly" that Marius was withholding opportunities from him. He demanded and received transfer to the army of Catulus, Marius's consular colleague.

In 102 BC, the invaders returned and moved to force the Alps. Catulus, with Sulla, moved to block their advance; the two men likely cooperated well. But Catulus's army was defeated in the eastern Alps and withdrew from Venetia and thence to the southern side of the river Po. At the same time, Marius had annihilated the Cimbri's allies, the Teutones, at the Battle of Aquae Sextiae. Marius, elected again to the consulship of 101, came to Catulus's aid; Sulla, in charge of supporting army provisioning, did so competently and was able to feed both armies. The two armies then crossed the Po and attacked the Cimbri. After the failure of negotiations, the Romans and Cimbri engaged in the Battle of the Raudian Field in which the Cimbri were routed and destroyed.

Victorious, Marius and Catulus were both granted triumphs as the commanding generals. Refusing to stand for an aedileship (which, due to its involvement in hosting public games, was extremely expensive), Sulla became a candidate for the praetorship in 99 BC. He was, however, defeated. In memoirs related via Plutarch, he claimed this was because the people demanded that he first stand for the aedilate so – due to his friendship with Bocchus, a rich foreign monarch, – he might spend money on games. Whether this story of Sulla's defeat is true is unclear. Regardless, Sulla stood for the praetorship again the next year and, promising he would pay for good shows, was elected praetor for 97 BC; he was assigned by lot to the urban praetorship.

=== Cilician governorship, 96–93 BC ===
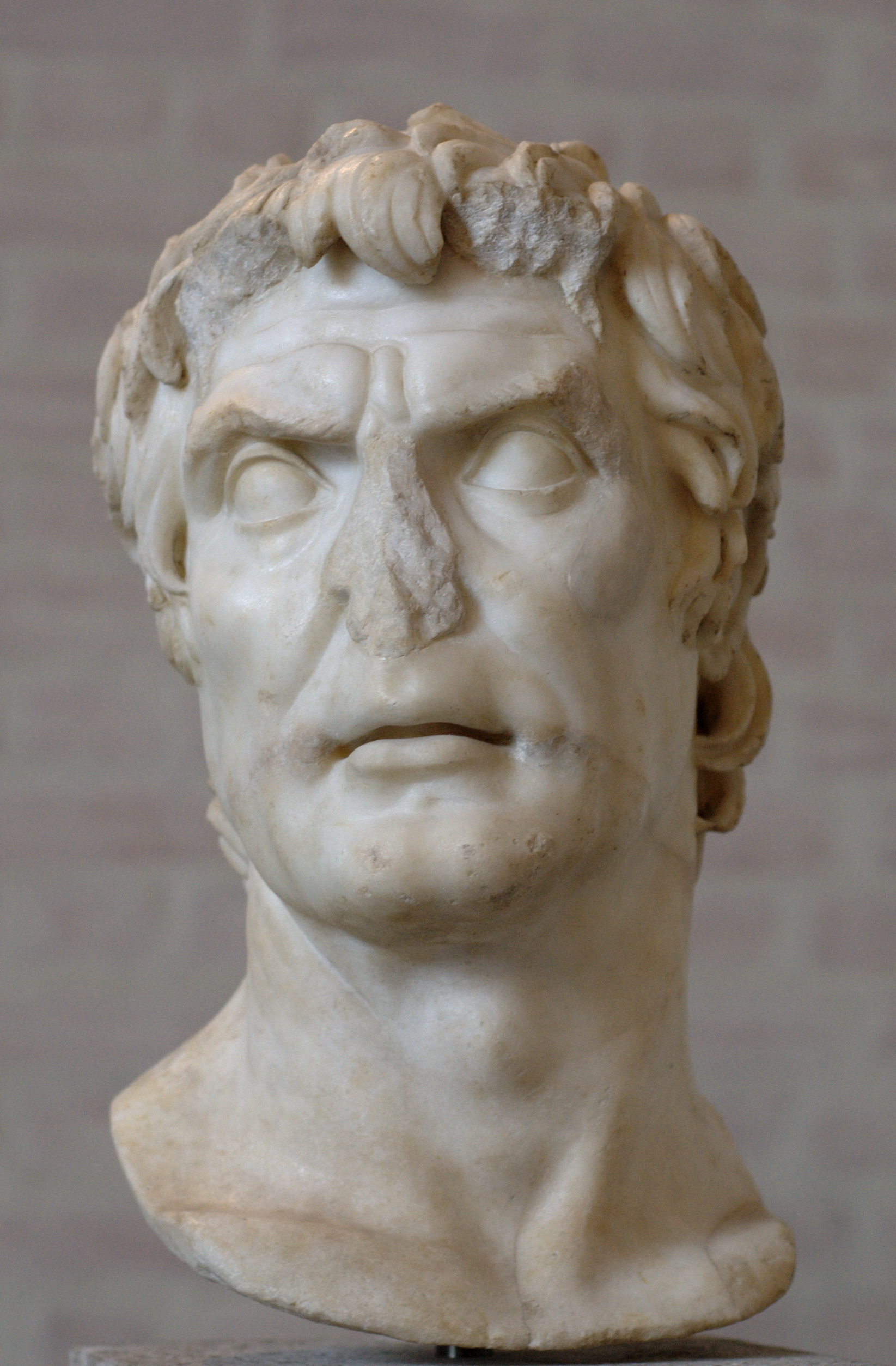
"Sulla", a copy (probably from the time of Augustus) after a portrait of an important Roman from the second century BC, with similarities to "Marius", suggesting that both statues were conceived and exhibited together as either siblings or rivals; Munich, Glyptothek.

His term as praetor was largely uneventful, excepting a public dispute with Gaius Julius Caesar Strabo (possibly his brother-in-law) and his magnificent holding of the ludi Apollinares. The next year, 96 BC, he was assigned – "probably pro consule as was customary" – to Cilicia in Asia Minor. While governing Cilicia, Sulla received orders from the Senate to restore Ariobarzanes to the throne of Cappadocia. Ariobarzanes had been driven out by Mithridates VI of Pontus, who wanted to install one of his own sons (Ariarathes) on the Cappadocian throne. Despite initial difficulties, Sulla was successful with minimal resources and preparation; with few Roman troops, he hastily levied allied soldiers and advanced quickly into rugged terrain before routing superior enemy forces. His troops were sufficiently impressed by his leadership that they hailed him imperator.

Sulla's campaign in Cappadocia had led him to the banks of the Euphrates, where he was approached by an embassy from the Parthian Empire. Sulla was the first Roman magistrate to meet a Parthian ambassador. At the meeting, he took the seat between the Parthian ambassador, Orobazus, and Ariobarzanes, seeking to gain psychological advantage over the Parthian envoy by portraying the Parthians and the Cappadocians as equals, with Rome being superior. While the Parthian ambassador, Orobazus, was executed upon his return to Parthia for allowing this humiliation, the Parthians ratified the treaty, establishing the Euphrates as a clear boundary between Parthia and Rome. At this meeting, Sulla was told by a Chaldean seer that he would die at the height of his fame and fortune. This prophecy was to have a powerful hold on Sulla throughout his lifetime.

In 94 BC, Sulla repulsed the forces of Tigranes the Great of Armenia from Cappadocia. He may have stayed in the east until 92 BC, when he returned to Rome; Keaveney places his departure in the year 93 BC. Sulla was regarded to have done well in the east: he had restored Ariobarzanes to the throne, been hailed imperator by his men, and was the first Roman to treat successfully with the Parthians. With military and diplomatic victory, his political fortunes seemed positive. However, his candidature was dealt a blow when he was brought up on charges of extorting Ariobarzanes. Even though the prosecutor declined to show up on the day of the trial, leading to Sulla's victory by default, Sulla's ambitions were frustrated.

=== Social War ===
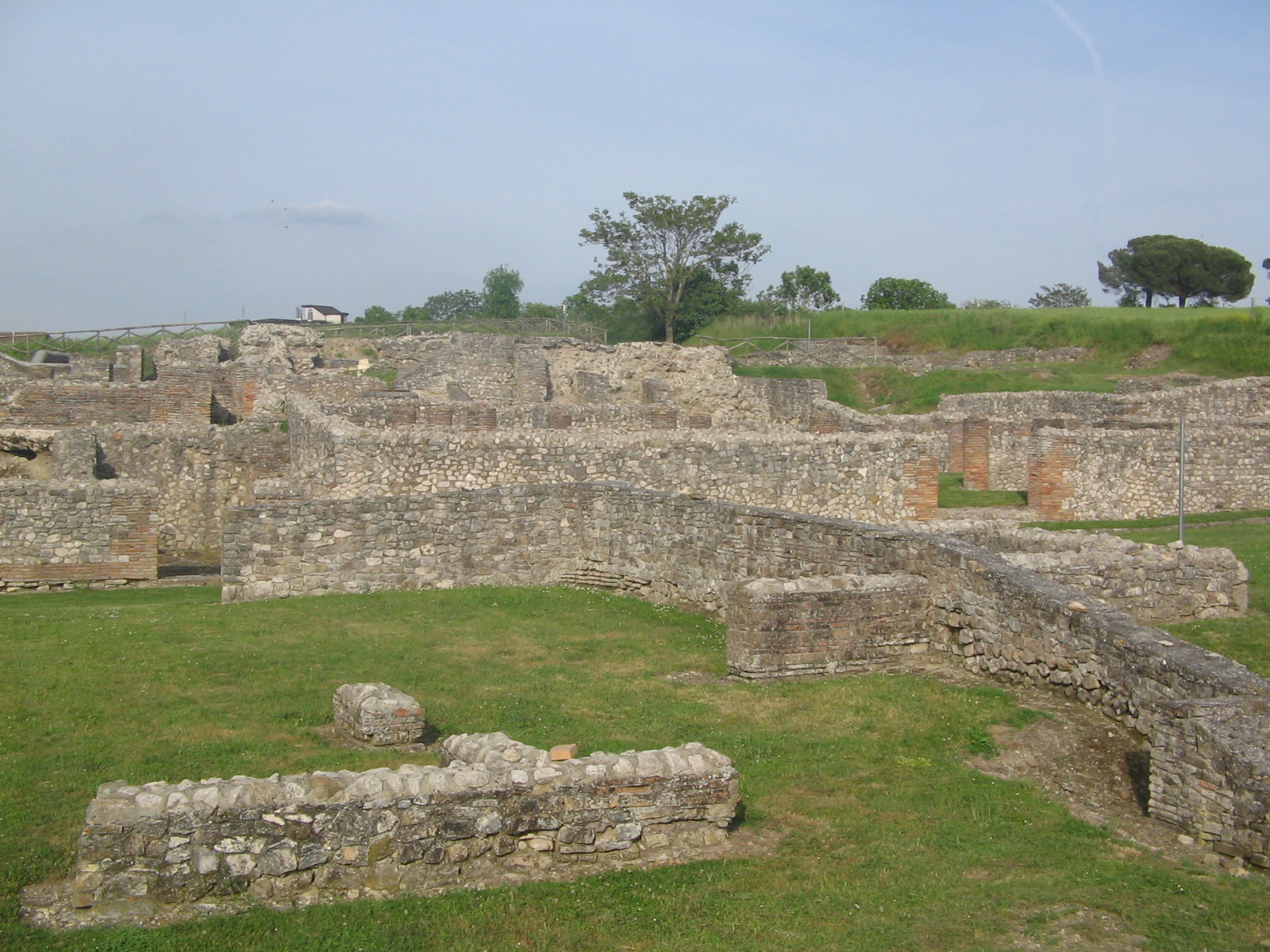
Ruins of the town of Aeclanum in southern Italy, conquered in 89 BC by Sulla.

Relations between Rome and its allies (the socii), had deteriorated over the years up to 91 BC. From 133 BC and the start of Tiberius Gracchus's land reforms, Italian communities were displaced from de jure Roman public lands over which no title had been enforced for generations. Various proposals to give the allies Roman citizenship over the decades had failed for various reasons, just as the allies also "became progressively more aware of the need to cease to be subjects and to share in the exercise of imperial power" by acquiring that citizenship. The Cimbric war also revived Italian solidarity, aided by Roman extension of corruption laws to allow allies to lodge extortion claims. When the pro-Italian plebeian tribune Marcus Livius Drusus was assassinated in 91 BC while trying again to pass a bill extending Roman citizenship, the Italians revolted.

The same year, Bocchus paid for the erection of a statue depicting Sulla's capture of Jugurtha. This may have been related to Sulla's campaign for the consulship. Regardless, if he had immediate plans for a consulship, they were forced into the background at the outbreak of war. At the start of the war, there were largely two theatres: a northern theatre from Picenum to the Fucine Lake and a southern theatre including Samnium. Sulla served as one of the legates in the southern theatre assigned to consul Lucius Julius Caesar.

In the first year of fighting, Roman strategy was largely one of containment, attempting to stop the revolting allies from spreading their rebellion into Roman-controlled territory. Sulla, in southern Italy, operated largely defensively on Lucius Julius Caesar's flank while the consul conducted offensive campaigning. Late in the year, Sulla cooperated with Marius (who was a legate in the northern theatre) in the northern part of southern Italy to defeat the Marsi: Marius defeated the Marsi, sending them headlong into Sulla's waiting forces. Sulla attempted also to assist Lucius's relief of the city of Aesernia, which was under siege, but both men were unsuccessful.

The next year, 89 BC, Sulla served as legate under the consul Lucius Porcius Cato. But after Cato's death in battle with the Marsi, Sulla was prorogued pro consule and placed in supreme command of the southern theatre. He brought Pompeii under siege. After one of the other legates was killed by his men, Sulla refused to discipline them except by issuing a proclamation imploring them to show more courage against the enemy. While besieging Pompeii, an Italian relief force came under Lucius Cluentius, which Sulla defeated and forced into flight towards Nola. Killing Cluentius before the city's walls, Sulla then besieged the town and for his efforts was awarded a grass crown, the highest Roman military honour. Pompeii was taken some time during the year, along with Stabiae and Aeclanum; with the capture of Aeclanum, Sulla forced the Hirpini to surrender. He then attacked the Samnites and routed one of their armies near Aesernia before capturing the new Italian capital at Bovianum Undecimanorum. All of these victories would have been won before the consular elections in October 89.

Political developments in Rome also started to bring an end to the war. In 89 BC, one of the tribunes of the plebs passed the lex Plautia Papiria, which granted citizenship to all of the allies (with exception for the Samnites and Lucanians still under arms). This had been preceded by the lex Julia, passed by Lucius Julius Caesar in October 90 BC, which had granted citizenship to those allies who remained loyal. Buttressed by success against Rome's traditional enemies, the Samnites, and general Roman victory across Italy, Sulla stood for and was elected easily to the consulship of 88 BC; his colleague would be Quintus Pompeius Rufus.

== First consulship, 88 BC ==
Sulla's election to the consulship, successful likely due to his military success in 89 BC, was not uncontested. Gaius Julius Caesar Strabo, merely an ex-aedile and one of Sulla's long-time enemies, had contested the top magistracy. Beyond personal enmity, Caesar Strabo may also have stood for office because it was evident that Rome's relations with the Pontic king, Mithridates VI Eupator, were deteriorating and that the consuls of 88 would be assigned an extremely lucrative and glorious command against Pontus. Pompey Strabo may have coveted a second consulship for similar reasons. The question as to whom to send against Mithridates would be one of the sources of the following domestic crisis.

Shortly after Sulla's election, probably in the last weeks of the year, Sulla married his daughter to one of his colleague Pompeius Rufus's sons. He also divorced his then-wife Cloelia and married Metella, widow of the recently deceased Marcus Aemilius Scaurus. These marriages helped build political alliances with the influential Caecilii Metelli and the Pompeys. He was also assigned by the senate, probably with the support of his consular colleague, Quintus Pompeius Rufus, the Mithridatic command.

=== Sulpicius ===
Sulla became embroiled in a political fight against one of the plebeian tribunes, Publius Sulpicius Rufus, on the matter of how the new Italian citizens were to be distributed into the Roman tribes for purposes of voting. Sulla and Pompeius Rufus opposed the bill, which Sulpicius took as a betrayal; Sulpicius, without the support of the consuls, therefore looked elsewhere for political allies. This led him to a secret deal with Marius, who had for years been coveting another military command, according to which Marius would support Sulpicius's Italian legislation in exchange for a law transferring Sulla's command to Marius. Sulpicius's attempts to push through the Italian legislation again brought him into violent urban conflict, especially since fully enfranchising the Italians was a cause in which the urban plebs at Rome had little interest, driving him to rally armed supporters to force his proposals through with violence. The consuls, fearful of intimidation of Sulpicius and his armed bodyguards, declared a suspension of public business (iustitium) which caused Sulpicius and his mob to force them to flee.

During the violence, Sulla was forced to shelter in Marius's nearby house, although he later denied this in his memoirs. Marius arranged for Sulla to lift the iustitium and allow Sulpicius to bring his proposals. Sulla, safe in Marius's house but at risk of Sulpicius's mob, agreed in exchange for promises of safe passage. He then quit the city for Capua before taking command of the army near Nola in southern Italy. He may have felt, after this political humiliation, that the only way to recover his dignity and career was to come back from the Mithridatic command victorious.

=== First march on Rome ===
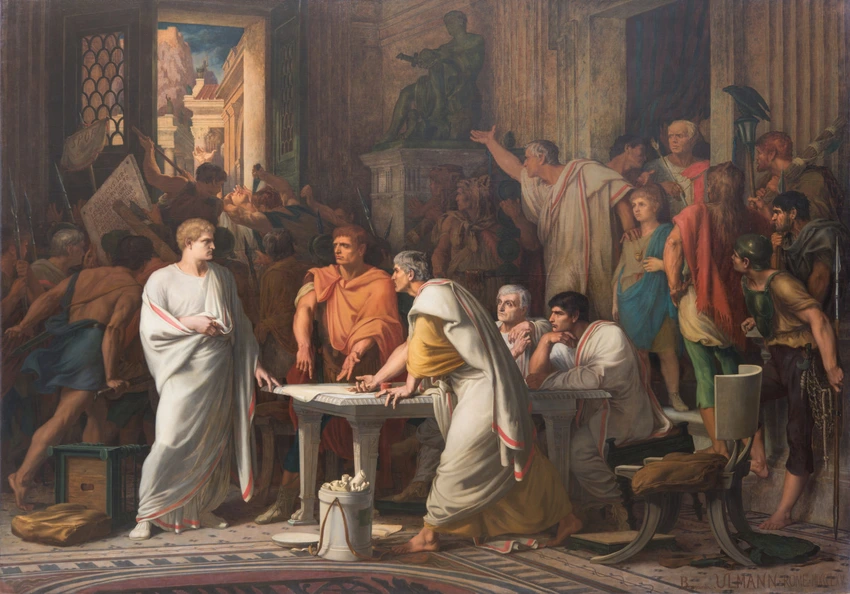
Depiction of the moment Sulla found shelter in Marius's house. By Benjamin Ulmann, c. 1866

With Sulpicius able to enact legislation without consular opposition, Sulla discovered that Marius had tricked him, for the first piece of legislation Sulpicius brought was a law transferring the command against Mithridates to Marius. Thus,

Sulla was presented with a choice. He could acknowledge the law as valid. To do so would mean total humiliation at the hands of his opponents, the end of his political career, and perhaps even further danger to his life. Or he could attempt to reverse it and regain his command. He can hardly have been in any doubt. Like Caesar, he was an outsider in politics, totally self-centred in pursuit of his ambitions, always ready to break the rules of the political game to achieve his objective... If Sulla hesitated it can only have been because he was not sure how his army would react.

Speaking to the men, Sulla complained to them of the outrageous behaviour of Marius and Sulpicius. He hinted to them that Marius would find other men to fight Mithridates, forcing them to give up opportunities to plunder the East, claims which were "surely false". The troops were willing to follow Sulla to Rome; his officers, however, realised Sulla's plans and deserted him (except his quaestor and kinsman, almost certainly Lucius Licinius Lucullus). They then killed Marcus Gratidius, one of Marius's legates, when Gratidius attempted to effect the transfer of command.

When the march on Rome started, the Senate and people were appalled. The Senate immediately sent an embassy demanding an explanation for his seeming march on the fatherland, to which Sulla responded boldly, saying that he was freeing it from tyrants. Rome having no troops to defend itself, Sulla entered the city; once there, however, his men were pelted with stones from the rooftops by common people. Almost breaking before Marius's makeshift forces, Sulla then stationed troops all over the city before summoning the Senate and inducing it to outlaw Marius, Marius's son, Sulpicius, and nine others. He then reinforced this decision by legislation, retroactively justifying his illegal march on the city and stripping the twelve outlaws of their Roman citizenship. Of the twelve outlaws, only Sulpicius was killed after being betrayed by a slave. Marius and his son, along with some others, escaped to Africa.

=== Aftermath ===
Sulla then had Sulpicius's legislation invalidated on the grounds that all had been passed by force. According only to Appian, he then brought legislation to strengthen the Senate's position in the state and weaken the plebeian tribunes by eliminating the comitia tributa as a legislative body and requiring that tribunes first receive senatorial approval for legislation; some scholars, however, reject Appian's account as mere retrojection of legislation passed during Sulla's dictatorship. He sent his army back to Capua and then conducted the elections for that year, which yielded a resounding rejection of him and his allies. His enemy, Lucius Cornelius Cinna, was elected consul for 87 BC in place of his candidate; his nephew was rejected as plebeian tribune while Marius's nephew was successful. Cinna, even before the election, said he would prosecute Sulla at the conclusion of the latter's consular term.

After the elections, Sulla forced the consuls designate to swear to uphold his laws. And for his consular colleague, he attempted to transfer to him the command of Gnaeus Pompeius Strabo's army. The law was vetoed by one of the tribunes, but when Quintus Pompeius Rufus went to Pompey Strabo's army to take command under the Senate's authority, he was promptly assassinated after his arrival and assumption of command, almost certainly on Strabo's orders. No action was taken against the troops nor any action taken to relieve Pompey Strabo of command. Sulla then quit Italy with his troops, ignoring legal summons, and marched into Macedonia where he assumed command from a legate already in theatre.

Sulla's ability to use military force against his own countrymen emerged from the upheavals of the Social War. According to the classicist Mary Beard in her 2015 book SPQR, the march was "in many ways a continuation of the Social War... a civil war between former allies and friends developed into a civil war between citizens... what was eroded in the process was the fundamental distinction between Romans and foreign enemies". Sulla's absence did little to stem political violence and military upheavals in Italy. Cinna violently quarrelled with his co-consul, Gnaeus Octavius, the next year. And after Octavius induced the senate to outlaw Cinna, Cinna suborned the army besieging Nola and induced the Italians again to rise up. With Marius offering his services and men to Cinna, by the end of 87 BC Cinna and Marius had besieged Rome and taken the city. They killed Cinna's co-consul Gnaeus Octavius, massacred their political enemies, and declared Sulla an outlaw before having themselves elected consuls for 86 BC. While Marius would not long outlive the events, Cinna's regime and allies would remain in control of politics at Rome until Sulla's returned from the East in 82 BC.

== Proconsular command and civil war ==
=== First Mithridatic War ===
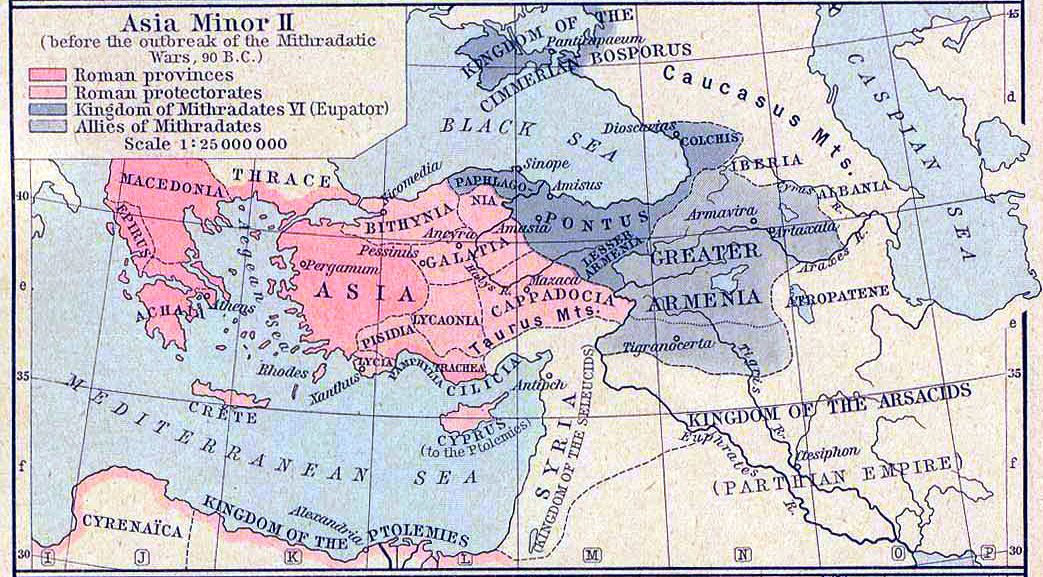
Asia Minor just before the First Mithridatic War

During the close of the Social War, in 89 BC, Mithridates VI Eupator of Pontus invaded Roman Asia. In mid-88, he reorganised the administration of the area before unsuccessfully besieging Rhodes. News of these conquests reached Rome in the autumn of 89 BC, leading the Senate and people to declare war; actual preparations for war were, however, delayed: after Sulla was given the command, it took him some eighteen months to organise five legions before setting off; Rome was also severely strained financially. While Rome was preparing to move against Pontus, Mithridates arranged the massacre of some eighty thousand Roman and Italian expatriates and their families – known today as the Asiatic vespers – and confiscated their properties.

Mithridates's successes against the Romans incited a revolt by the Athenians against Roman rule. The Athenian politician Aristion had himself elected as strategos epi ton hoplon and established a tyranny over the city. Hind 1994 dismisses claims in Plutarch that Vellius Paterclus of Athens was forced to cooperate with Mithridates as "very hollow" and "apologia". Rome defended Delos unsuccessfully from a joint invasion by Athens and Pontus. They were, however, successful in holding Macedonia, then governed by propraetor Gaius Sentius Saturninus and his legate Quintus Bruttius Sura.

==== Sack of Athens ====
Early in 87 BC, Sulla transited the Adriatic for Thessaly with his five legions. Upon his arrival, Sulla had his quaestor Lucullus order Sura, who had vitally delayed Mithridates's advances into Greece, to retreat back into Macedonia. He separately besieged Athens and Piraeus (the Long Walls had since been demolished). Threatened by the Pontic navy, Sulla sent his quaestor Lucullus to scrounge about for allied naval forces. At the same time, Mithridates attempted to force a land battle in northern Greece, and dispatched a large army across the Hellespont. These sieges lasted until spring of 86 BC.

Discovering a weak point in the walls and popular discontent with the Athenian tyrant Aristion, Sulla stormed and captured Athens (except the Acropolis) on 1 March 86 BC. The Acropolis was then besieged. Athens itself was spared total destruction due to its cultural importance in the Hellenistic world but the city was sacked regardless. In need of money and metal, Sulla also sacked the temples of Epidaurus, Delphi, and Olympia; after a battle with the Pontic general Archelaus outside Piraeus, Sulla's forces forced the Pontic garrison to withdraw by sea. Capturing the city, Sulla had it destroyed.

==== Boeotian battles ====
In mid-86 BC, two major battles were fought in Boeotia. The Battle of Chaeronea was fought in early summer around the same time the Athenian Acropolis was taken. The later battle of Orchomenus was fought in high summer but before the start of the autumn rains. The Pontic casualties given in Plutarch and Appian, the main sources for the battles, are exaggerated; Sulla's report that he suffered merely fifteen losses is not credible.

Sulla decamped his army from Attica toward central Greece. Having exhausted available provisions near Athens, doing so was both necessary to ensure the survival of his army and also to relieve a brigade of six thousand men cut off in Thessaly. He declined battle with Pontus at the hill Philoboetus near Chaeronea before manoeuvring to capture higher ground and build earthworks. After some days, both sides engaged in battle. The Romans neutralised a Pontic charge of scythed chariots before pushing the Pontic phalanx back across the plain. According to the ancient sources, Archelaus commanded between 60,000 and 120,000 men; in the aftermath, he allegedly escaped with only 10,000.

After the Battle of Chaeronea, Sulla learnt that Cinna's government had sent Lucius Valerius Flaccus to take over his command. Sulla had officially been declared an outlaw and in the eyes of the Cinnan regime, Flaccus was to take command of an army without a legal commander. Sulla moved to intercept Flaccus's army in Thessaly, but turned around when Pontic forces reoccupied Boeotia. Turning south, he engaged the Pontic army – allegedly 90,000 – on the plain of Orchomenus. His troops prepared the ground by starting to dig a series of three trenches, which successfully contained the Pontic cavalry. When the Pontic cavalry attacked to interrupt the digging, the Romans almost broke; Sulla, on foot, personally rallied his men and stabilised the area. Roman forces then surrounded the Pontic camp. Archelaus tried to break out but was unsuccessful; Sulla then annihilated the Pontic army and captured its camp. Archelaus himself escaped, and hid in the nearby marshes before escaping to Chalcis.

==== Peace with Mithridates ====
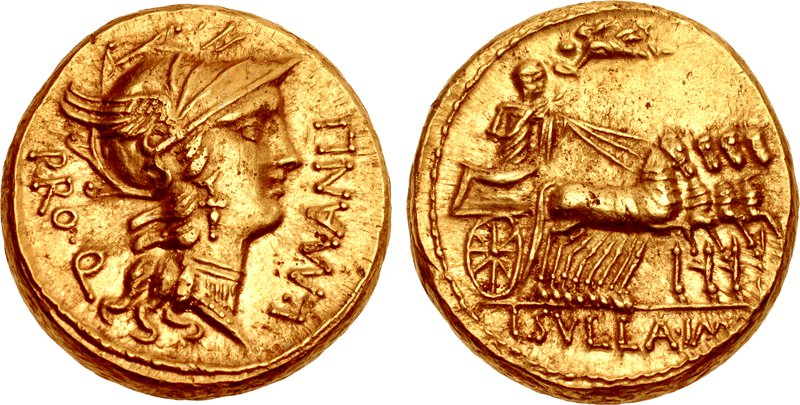
Coin depicting the triumph of Sulla after the First Mithridatic War (right).

In the aftermath of the battle, Sulla was approached by Archelaus for terms. With Mithridates's armies in Europe almost entirely destroyed, Archelaus and Sulla negotiated a set of relatively cordial peace terms which were then forwarded to Mithridates. Mithridates was to give Asia and Paphlagonia back to Rome. He was to return the kingdoms of Bithynia and Cappadocia to Nicomedes and Ariobarzanes, respectively. Mithridates would also equip Sulla with seventy or eighty ships and pay a war indemnity of two or three thousand talents. Sulla would ratify Mithridates's position in Pontus and have him declared a Roman ally.

Mithridates, still in Asia, was faced with local uprisings against his rule. Adding to his challenges was Lucullus's fleet, reinforced by Rhodian allies. When Flaccus's consular army marched through Macedonia towards Thrace, his command was usurped by his legate Gaius Flavius Fimbria, who had Flaccus killed before chasing Mithridates with his army into Asia itself. Faced with Fimbria's army in Asia, Lucullus's fleet off the coast, and internal unrest, Mithridates eventually met with Sulla at Dardanus in autumn 85 BC and accepted the terms negotiated by Archelaus.

After peace was reached, Sulla advanced on Fimbria's forces, which deserted their upstart commander. Fimbria then committed suicide after a failed attempt on Sulla's life. Sulla then settled affairs – "reparations, rewards, administrative and financial arrangements for the future" – in Asia, staying there until 84 BC. He then sailed for Italy at the head of 1,200 ships. The peace reached with Mithridates was condemned in ancient times as a betrayal of Roman interests in favour of Sulla's private interest in fighting and winning the coming civil war. Modern sources have been somewhat less damning, as the Mithridatic campaigns later showed that no quick victory over Pontus was possible as long as Mithridates survived. However, this and Sulla's delay in Asia are "not enough to absolve him of the charge of being more concerned with revenge on opponents in Italy than with Mithridates". The extra time spent in Asia, moreover, equipped him with forces and money later put to good use in Italy.

=== Civil war ===
Sulla crossed the Adriatic for Brundisium in spring of 83 BC with five legions of Mithridatic veterans, capturing Brundisium without a fight. Metellus Pius had declared for Sulla even before Sulla's landing in Italy; Sulla's arrival in Brundisium induced more senators to join him. Marcus Licinius Crassus, who had already fled from the Cinnan regime, raised an army in Spain, and departed for Africa to join with Metellus Pius. Pompey, the son of Pompey Strabo, raised a legion from his clients in Picenum and also joined Sulla; Sulla treated him with great respect and addressed him as imperator before dispatching him to raise more troops. Even those whom Sulla had quarrelled with (including Publius Cornelius Cethegus, whom Sulla had outlawed in 88 BC) defected to join his side.

The general feeling in Italy, however, was decidedly anti-Sullan; many people feared Sulla's wrath and still held memories of his extremely unpopular occupation of Rome during his consulship. The Senate moved the senatus consultum ultimum against him and was successful in levying large amount of men and material from the Italians. Sulla, enriched by his previous looting in Asia, was able to advance quickly and largely without the ransacking of the Italian countryside. Advancing on Capua, he met the two consuls of that year – Lucius Cornelius Scipio Asiaticus and Gaius Norbanus – who had dangerously divided their forces. He defeated Norbanus at the Battle of Mount Tifata, forcing the consul to withdraw. Continuing towards Scipio's position at Teanum Sidicinum, Sulla negotiated a truce and came close to persuading Scipio to defect. However, one of Scipio's lieutenants seized a town held by Sulla, violating the truce, and negotiations broke down. The breakdown allowed Sulla to play the aggrieved party and place blame on his enemies for any further bloodshed. Scipio's army blamed their own commander for the breakdown in negotiations and made it clear to the consul that they would not fight Sulla, who at this point appeared as a peacemaker. Sulla, hearing this, feigned an attack while instructing his veterans to fraternise with Scipio's newly recruited army. Scipio's men quickly abandoned him for Sulla; finding him almost alone in his camp, Sulla tried again to persuade Scipio to defect. When Scipio refused, Sulla let him go. Sulla attempted to open negotiations with Norbanus, who was at Capua, but Norbanus refused to treat and withdrew to Praeneste as Sulla advanced. While Sulla was moving in the south, Scipio fought Pompey in Picenum but was defeated when his troops again deserted.

For 82 BC, the consular elections returned Gnaeus Papirius Carbo, in his third consulship, with the younger Gaius Marius, son of the seven-time consul, who was then twenty-six. The remainder of 83 BC was dedicated to recruiting for the next year's campaign amid poor weather: Quintus Sertorius had raised a considerable force in Etruria, but was alienated from the consuls by the election of Gaius Marius's son rather than himself and so left to his praetorian province of Hispania Citerior; Sulla repudiated recognition of any treaties with the Samnites, whom he did not consider to be Roman citizens due to his rejection of Marius and Cinna's deal in 87 BC. Fighting in 82 BC began with reverses for Sulla's opponents: their governors in Africa and Sardinia were deposed. When the campaign in Italy started, two theatres emerged, with Sulla facing the younger Marius in the south and Metellus Pius facing Carbo in the north. Marius, buttressed by Samnite support, fought a long and hard battle with Sulla at Sacriportus that resulted in defeat when five of his cohorts defected. After the battle, Marius withdrew to Praeneste and was there besieged.

After the younger Marius's defeat, Sulla had the Samnite war captives massacred, which triggered an uprising in his rear. He left one of his allies, Quintus Lucretius Afella to maintain the siege at Praeneste and moved for Rome. At the same time, the younger Marius sent word to assemble the Senate and purge it of suspected Sullan sympathisers: the urban praetor Lucius Junius Brutus Damasippus then had four prominent men killed at the ensuing meeting. The purge did little to strengthen resolve; when Sulla arrived at Rome, the city opened its gates and his opponents fled. Sulla had his enemies declared hostes, probably from outside the pomerium, and he addressed an assembly where he apologised for the war. He then left to fight Carbo in Etruria.

Carbo, who had suffered defeats by Metellus Pius and Pompey, attempted to move to relieve his co-consul Marius at Praeneste. Skilfully withdrawing to Clusium, he delegated to Norbanus command of troops to hold Metellus Pius. There, Sulla attacked him in an indecisive battle. Pompey ambushed eight legions sent to relieve Praeneste; the Samnites and the Lucanians also rose, moving to relieve Praeneste or join with Carbo in the north; Sulla moved south to oppose them. Sulla's movements are described only vaguely by Appian, but he was successful in preventing the Italians from relieving Praeneste or joining with Carbo. In the north at the same time, Norbanus was defeated and fled for Rhodes, where he eventually committed suicide. After another attempt to relieve Praeneste failed, Carbo lost his nerve and attempted to retreat to Africa; his lieutenants attempted again to relieve Praeneste; again they failed, but then marched on Rome to force Sulla from his well-defended positions. Sulla hurried in full force towards Rome and there fought the Battle of the Colline Gate on the afternoon of 1 November 82 BC. Sulla's wing was defeated and Sulla himself took refuge in his camp, but his lieutenant Crassus on the right wing was victorious. Sulla's men fled towards Rome but were met with a closed gate, forcing them to stand and fight. During the night they too were victorious. With Crassus pursuing the enemy far into the countryside and victory at the Colline Gate, Sulla's forces had won. "For all intents and purposes the civil war in Italy was over"; the Samnite and anti-Sullan commanders were hunted down.

== Dictatorship and constitutional reforms ==
After the battle at the Colline Gate, Sulla summoned the Senate to the temple of Bellona on the Campus Martius the next day (2 November 82 BC). There, while giving a speech, he had three or four thousand Samnite prisoners butchered, to the shock of the attending senators. Sulla marched to Praeneste and forced its siege to a close, with the younger Marius dead from suicide before its surrender. Sulla had his stepdaughter Aemilia (daughter of princeps senatus Marcus Aemilius Scaurus) married to Pompey, although she shortly died in childbirth. Pompey was then dispatched to recover Sicily. With the capture and execution of Carbo, who had fled Sicily for Egypt, both consuls for 82 BC were now dead.

=== Proscription ===
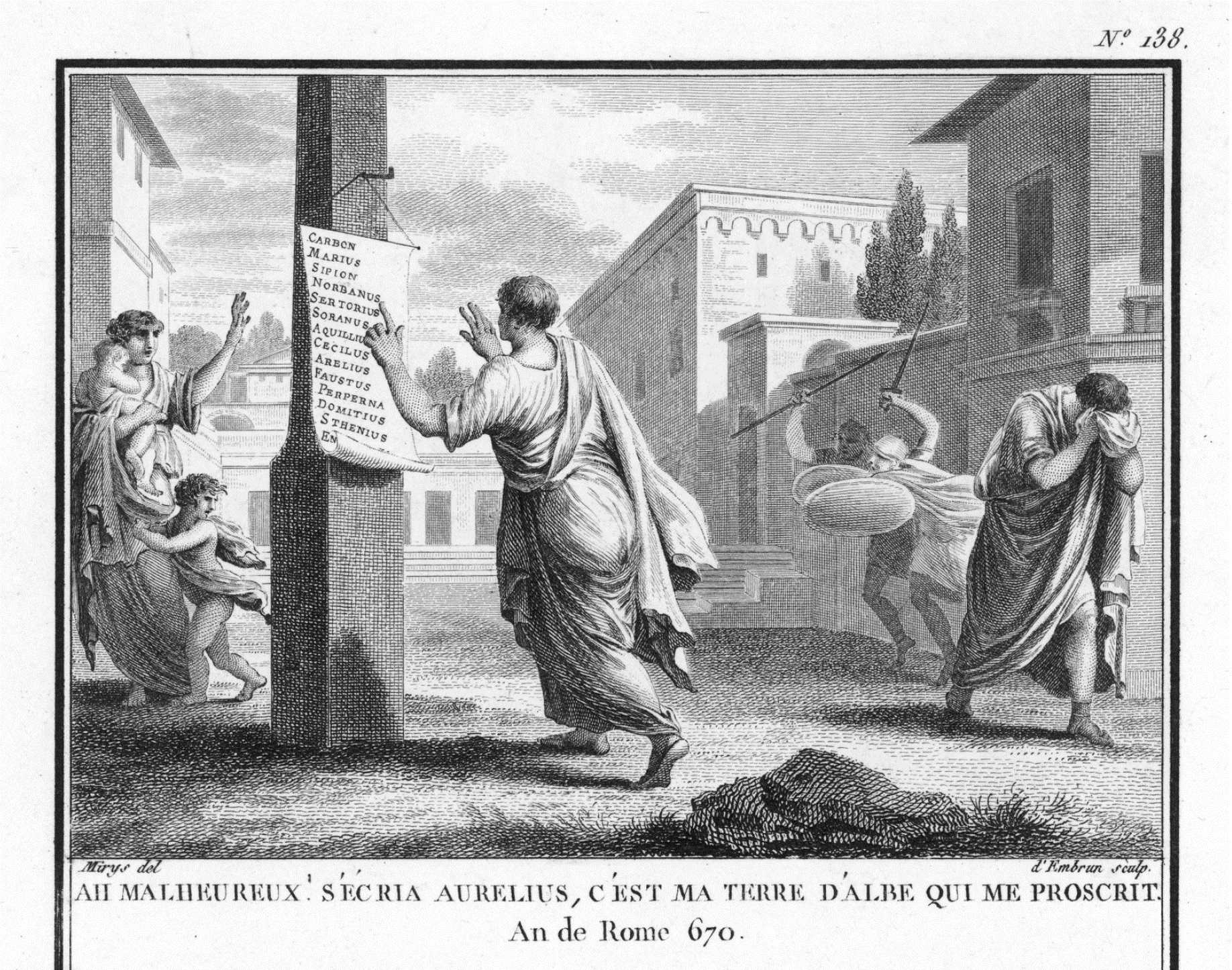
Depiction of Quintus Aurelius shortly before his death, finding that his name was added to the proscription lists. By S D Mirys (c. 1799).

In the aftermath of the killings of his allies at the orders of the younger Marius during the civil war, just weeks earlier, Sulla sought to retaliate immediately. He also sought the political goal of destroying the Cinno-Marian political faction. Even before the proscriptions started some of Sulla's supporters had already taken the opportunity to avenge themselves on personal enemies in the chaos. Sulla initially proposed proscription lists before the Senate when it met at the Temple of Bellona but the senators refused to approve them. He instead published a first list as a proconsular edict the next day on 3 November, before he arrived to Praeneste. It initially had some 80 names and included almost every living magistrate who had been elected under the Cinnan regime who had not defected to Sulla's side; more lists were published in the coming days naming hundreds of additional victims.

If a person was put on the lists, it meant that person was condemned to death without trial, that whoever killed that person would be given full immunity, that that person's property was forfeit to the state, and that the descendants thereof were barred from any civil office for two generations. Rewards were also given to those who helped kill and informed on the victims, with accompanying penalties for those who defended or hid them. Beyond the Cinnans and Marians which Sulla wanted to kill, many men seemed to have been added mostly so that Sulla's partisans could avenge themselves on personal enemies or so that they could simply take choice properties. The state auctions conducted for confiscated properties were notorious for sales to Sulla's friends at far below market prices. This scramble for cheap property and revenge consumed much of the Italian peninsula.

Many proscribed men fled Italy, with almost a quarter of the known proscribed joining Quintus Sertorius, a Marian general, in armed resistance in Spain. Others fled to Mithridates in Pontus. A few were allowed to live out their lives under the new regime: Sulla allowed Lucius Cornelius Scipio Asiaticus (consul in 83 BC) to live out his life in exile at Massalia; others, such as the then-young Gaius Julius Caesar, may have been reprieved with the intervention of friends and family.

=== Dictatorship and reforms ===
When the proscriptions started to wrap up, Sulla sought to effect reforms to the state and constitution. Sulla sought the means to do this by reviving the dictatorship, a magistracy by Sulla's time over a century in abeyance. The normal means of appointing a dictator were unavailable due to his having killed or driven to flight both consuls; he therefore induced the Senate to elect a interrex (the aged princeps senatus Lucius Valerius Flaccus) and instructed him to propose legislation to the centuriate assembly effecting the dictatorial appointment. The resulting lex Valeria created Sulla dictator legis scribundis et rei publicae constituendae (for the enactment of laws and regulation of the republic) without time limit, investing him with almost unlimited powers while indemnifying him for all actions previously or in the future taken.

Sulla's reform programme has been differently viewed. More traditionally it was viewed as a restoration of older or archaic republican forms with a focus on senatorial dominance of the state. However, more recently such a return to traditional practice has been instead read more as archaising rhetoric meant to legitimise novel reforms that elevated legal rules over traditional republican principles of public deliberation and compromise. His reforms had four major themes: (1) the expansion of public criminal law and the permanent courts; (2) a weakening of the plebeian tribunate; (3) changes to the number and duties of the magistrates; and (4) an expanded Senate by broadening senatorial qualifications.

Sulla's vision of the republic was a system of laws binding governors enforced by a system of permanent jury courts. To this end, he expanded the scope of the laws against treason (maiestas) and corruption (repetundae) so to control the activities of provincial governors, stripping them of their previous initiative and subjugating them to orders from Rome. The expanded courts would be staffed by entirely senatorial juries and governors' orders would come from the Senate, as Sulla sought also to weaken the plebeian tribunate. Given that every political crisis in living memory had been caused by tribunes bringing divisive and provocative proposals, this should be little surprise. Tribunes were banned from introducing legislation, barred from seeking further political office, and left with rump obstructive powers.

The number of praetors and quaestors was increased to provide presidents to the criminal courts and make it possible to rotate out provincial governors more frequently. After Sulla's dictatorship it became expected for a praetor to preside for his year over a court at Rome before rotating into a provincial governorship the next year. Strict qualifications were also set, with men barred from again holding the same office for ten years. The increased number of quaestors, henceforth twenty, also provided manpower to support those governors and, through the automatic induction of ex-quaestors into the Senate, the men to staff the many juries for the criminal tribunals. While automatic induction of ex-quaestors meant censors were no longer required to adjust the Senate's membership, Sulla did not abolish the censorship: censors continued to be elected in the years afterwards but the political consequences of registering the mass of new Italian citizens likely caused the Romans to stall out the process by electing censors only intermittently. Other reforms also came, with Sulla abolishing the corn dole to urban residents, abolishing election and returning to co-option of priests, and imposing new sumptuary laws. He also took the opportunity to settle his veterans on land seized from men or communities who opposed him during the war; and with some ten thousand slaves owned by proscribed men, he freed so to create large numbers of freedmen clients loyal to him and his memory.

To inaugurate this reformed republic, Sulla served an ordinary consulship in 80 BC with Metellus Pius. Sulla resigned his dictatorship and served an ordinary consulship for the remainder of the year. He also disbanded his legions and, through these gestures, attempted to show the re-establishment of normal consular government. He dismissed his lictores and walked unguarded in the Forum, offering to give account of his actions to any citizen. The move was intended to signal an end to the political crisis and a return to normality.

The bulk of the reforms, however, proved unworkable. His reforms to criminal law sought to replace public deliberation, norms, and flexibility with the rigidity of law, even as the restrictions on the tribunate meant many of those laws would be spottily if at all enforced. The increased number of lower magistrates also proved to greatly increase the intensity for competition to the upper magistracies. Indeed, the influx of new men who held only junior office and could not expect promotion, along with the death of large portions of the political class in the civil war and the Social War preceding it, meant that the post-Sullan Senate was and would be politically and militarily inexperienced in comparison to its prewar counterpart.

== Retirement and death ==
During his consulship 80 BC Sulla married for the last time, taking Valeria as his wife. Conducting the elections for the consulship of 79, his allies would succeed him in power. He was also offered the province of Cisalpine Gaul while his consular colleague was sent to Spain to fight Sertorius. Sulla however declined, preferring instead at the end of his term to withdraw to his country villa near Puteoli. There, he continued to engage in a luxurious lifestyle accompanied by actors and musicians; he was also engaged in writing his memoirs and intermittently intervened in Roman politics with his immense influence.

With the end of the civil war Sulla's faction started to fall apart. The campaign for the consulship of 78 saw Sulla's enemies make an electoral comeback, buoyed by support from Sulla's former lieutenant Pompey, who supported Marcus Aemilius Lepidus for the consulship. Sulla, again in the city, exerted his influence in favour of his friend Quintus Lutatius Catulus Capitolinus and was able to secure Catulus's election after Lepidus. The year 78 saw Lepidus and Catulus quarrel strenuously over Sulla's settlements, first over the matter of civil disabilities for proscription victims and Sulla's land distributions before expanding to the issue of restoring the now-abolished grain dole and the plebeian tribunes' powers. At Puteoli, not long into the year, Sulla died. According to ancient sources, he was engaged in public business in the town when he learnt that one of the municipal magistrates was embezzling funds from the town treasury. He had the man brought before him and shouted orders to have him strangled. The exertion of the shout caused him to suffer an oral haemorrhage, consistent with symptoms of acute liver failure, and he died the next day.

Disputes between the consuls Lepidus and Catulus moved on to whether Sulla should be given a public funeral; but Catulus carried the issue with Pompey's support over Lepidus's objections. His funeral in Rome (in the Forum, in the presence of the whole city) was on a scale unmatched until that of Augustus in AD 14. Sulla's body was brought into the city on a golden bier, escorted by his veteran soldiers, and funeral orations were delivered by several eminent senators, with the main oration possibly delivered by Lucius Marcius Philippus or Quintus Hortensius. Sulla's body was then cremated and his ashes placed in his tomb in the Campus Martius. An epitaph, which Sulla composed himself, was inscribed onto the tomb, reading, "No friend ever served me, and no enemy ever wronged me, whom I have not repaid in full." Plutarch claims he had seen Sulla's personal motto carved on his tomb on the Campus Martius. The personal motto was "no better friend, no worse enemy."

== Legacy ==
=== Roman views and as an exemplum ===
In the immediate aftermath of Sulla's retirement, even before his death, his reforms were already being challenged. And with his death republican politics started immediately to debate his life and legacy. Lepidus's success in mobilising arms against the Sullan republic in just two years following his death shows substantial malcontent. In most late republican and early imperial narratives, depictions of Sulla are almost uniformly hostile with him appearing as a cruel and bloodthirsty tyrant, indeed an exemplum of excessive, cruel, and vengeful violence.

Historians have debated, however, whether or not there was a negative view of the dictator already fully developed in the few years after his death. The Italian and French scholars Umberto Laffi and François Hinard argued that this negative tradition emerged some time between Caesar's victory in the civil war and the time of the emperor Nero, driven by Caesarian propaganda and the triumviral proscriptions. Arguing that this hostile "Sulla myth" emerged only with the victory of Sulla's enemies, they believed that views of Sulla in the 70s through the 50s were essentially mixed with support for his aristocratic politics – especially justified as necessary to preserve the republic – and opposition to his excesses in achieving his aims, especially with the proscriptions. Others have argued on the other hand that Sulla was in the immediate aftermath of his death seen as a tyrannical killer, pointing out that evidence from the Ciceronean speeches may be so interpreted and that broad support (even among former Sullans) for repeal of his constitutional settlements signals a similarly broad opposition to his politics.

=== Precedent for force ===
Sulla is generally seen as having set the precedent for Caesar's march on Rome and dictatorship. Cicero comments that Pompey once said, "If Sulla could, why can't I?" Sulla's example proved that it could be done, therefore inspiring others to attempt it; in this respect, he has been seen as another step in the Republic's fall. Sulla attempted to mitigate this by passing laws to limit the actions of generals in their provinces, and although these laws remained in effect well into the imperial period, they did not prevent determined generals, such as Pompey and Julius Caesar, from using their armies for personal ambition against the Senate, a danger of which Sulla was intimately aware. While Sulla's laws such as those concerning qualification for admittance to the Senate, reform of the legal system and regulations of governorships remained on Rome's statutes long into the principate, much of his legislation was repealed less than a decade after his death. The veto power of the tribunes and their legislating authority were soon reinstated, ironically during the consulships of Pompey and Crassus.

=== Descendants ===
Sulla's descendants continued to be prominent in Roman politics into the imperial period. His son, Faustus Cornelius Sulla, issued denarii bearing the name of the dictator, as did a grandson, Quintus Pompeius Rufus. His descendants among the Cornelii Sullae would hold four consulships during the imperial period: Lucius Cornelius Sulla in 5 BC, Faustus Cornelius Sulla in AD 31, Lucius Cornelius Sulla Felix in AD 33, and Faustus Cornelius Sulla Felix in 52 AD (he was the son of the consul of 31, and the husband of Claudia Antonia, daughter of the emperor Claudius). The execution of Faustus Cornelius Sulla Felix in AD 62 on the orders of emperor Nero made him the last of the Cornelii Sullae.

== Cultural references ==
- Sulla is the subject of four Italian operas, two of which take considerable liberties with history: Lucio Silla by Wolfgang Amadeus Mozart and Silla by George Frideric Handel. In each, he is portrayed as a bloody, womanising, ruthless tyrant who eventually repents his ways and steps down from the throne of Rome. Pasquale Anfossi and Johann Christian Bach also wrote operas on this subject.
- Sulla is a character in Taylor Caldwell's novel A Pillar of Iron; in it, he has Marcus Tullius Cicero's injured brother, Quintus, recovering in his home, as Quintus is a soldier under his command. He is shown as cold, calculating and ruthless, yet a devoted leader to his men and sternly wedded to his personal ideals for Rome.
- Sulla is a central character in the first three Masters of Rome novels, by Colleen McCullough. Sulla is depicted as ruthless and amoral, very self-assured, and personally brave and charming, especially with women. His charm and ruthlessness make him a valuable aide to Gaius Marius. Sulla's desire to move out of the shadow of aging Marius eventually leads to civil war. Sulla softened considerably after the birth of his son, and was devastated when the boy died at a young age. The novels depict Sulla full of regrets about having to put aside his homosexual relationship with a Greek actor (Metrobius) to take up his public career.
- Sulla is played by Richard Harris in the 2002 miniseries Julius Caesar.
- Sulla is a character in the first book of the Emperor novels by Conn Iggulden, which are centred around the lives of Gaius Julius Caesar and Marcus Junius Brutus.
- Sulla is a major character in Roman Blood, the first of the Roma Sub Rosa mystery novels by Steven Saylor.
- Sulla is the subject of The Sword of Pleasure, a novel by Peter Green published in the UK in 1957. The novel is in the form of an autobiography.

== Marriages and children ==
- According to Plutarch, His first wife was Ilia. If Plutarch's text is to be amended to "Julia", then she is likely to have been one of the Julias related to Julius Caesar, most likely Julia Caesaris, Caesar's first cousin once removed. They had two children:
  - The first was Cornelia, who first married Quintus Pompeius Rufus the Younger and later Mamercus Aemilius Lepidus Livianus, giving birth to Pompeia (third wife of Julius Caesar) with the former.
  - The second was Lucius Cornelius Sulla, who died young.
- His second wife was Aelia.
- His third wife was Cloelia, whom Sulla divorced due to sterility.
- His fourth wife was Caecilia Metella, with whom he also had three children:
  - They had twins Faustus Cornelius Sulla, who was a quaestor in 54 BC, and Fausta Cornelia, who first married Gaius Memmius (praetor in 58 BC), then later Titus Annius Milo (praetor in 54 BC). Fausta's son from her first marriage was Gaius Memmius, suffect consul in 34 BC.
  - A son who died young, shortly before his mother's own death.
- His fifth and last wife was Valeria, with whom he had only one child, a daughter:
  - Cornelia Postuma, who was born after Sulla's death.

== Appearance and character ==
Sulla was red-blond, with blue eyes, and had a dead-white face covered with red marks. Plutarch notes that Sulla considered that "his golden head of hair gave him a singular appearance." He was said to have a duality between being charming, easily approachable, and able to joke and cavort with the most simple of people, while also assuming a stern demeanor when he was leading armies and as dictator. An example of the extent of his charming side was that his soldiers would sing a ditty about Sulla's one testicle, although without truth, which he allowed as being "fond of a jest." This duality, or inconsistency, made him very unpredictable and "at the slightest pretext, he might have a man crucified, but, on another occasion, would make light of the most appalling crimes; or he might happily forgive the most unpardonable offenses, and then punish trivial, insignificant misdemeanors with death and confiscation of property."

His excesses and penchant for debauchery could be attributed to the difficult circumstances of his youth, such as losing his father while he was still in his teens and retaining a doting stepmother, necessitating an independent streak from an early age. The circumstances of his relative poverty as a young man left him removed from his patrician brethren, enabling him to consort with revelers and experience the baser side of human nature. This "firsthand" understanding of human motivations and the ordinary Roman citizen may explain why he was able to succeed as a general despite lacking any significant military experience before his 30s. The historian Sallust fleshes out this character sketch of Sulla:

He was well versed both in Greek and Roman literature, and had a truly remarkable mind. He was devoted to pleasure but more devoted to glory. He never allowed his debaucheries to interfere with his duties but he devoted all his leisure time to them. He was both eloquent and clever, and he made friends easily. When it came to hiding his intentions, his mind was incredibly unfathomable, yet with all else he was extremely generous; especially with money.

== Chronology ==
- c. 138 BC: Born in Rome.
- 110 BC: Marries first wife.
- 107–105 BC: Quaestor and pro quaestore to Gaius Marius in the war with Jugurtha in Numidia.
- 106 BC: End of Jugurthine War.
- 104 BC: Legatus to Marius (serving his second consulship) in Gallia Transalpina.
- 103 BC: Tribunus militum in the army of Marius (serving his third consulship) in Gallia Transalpina.
- 102–101 BC: Legatus to Quintus Lutatius Catulus (who was consul at the time) and pro consule in Gallia Cisalpina.
- 101 BC: Took part in the defeat of the Cimbri at the Battle of Vercellae.
- 97 BC: Praetor urbanus.
- 96 BC: Propraetor of the province of Cilicia, pro consule.
- 90–89 BC: Senior officer in the Social War, as legatus pro praetore.
- 88 BC:
  - Holds the consulship for the first time, with Quintus Pompeius Rufus as colleague.
  - Marches on Rome and outlaws Marius.
- 87 BC: Commands Roman armies to fight King Mithridates of Pontus in the First Mithridatic War.
- 86 BC: Participates in the sack of Athens, the battle of Chaeronea and the battle of Orchomenus.
- 85 BC: Liberates the provinces of Macedonia, Asia, and Cilicia from Pontic occupation.
- 84 BC: Reorganizes the province of Asia.
- 83 BC: Returns to Italy and undertakes civil war against the factional Marian government.
- 83–82 BC: Enters war with the followers of Gaius Marius the Younger and Cinna.
- 82 BC: Obtains victory at the battle of the Colline Gate.
- 82/81 BC: Appointed dictator legibus faciendis et rei publicae constituendae causa.
- 80 BC: Holds the consulship for the second time. His colleague was Metellus Pius. Resigned the dictatorship at the beginning of the year.
- 79 BC: Retires from political life, refusing the post consulatum provincial command of Gallia Cisalpina he was allotted as consul, but retaining the curatio for the reconstruction of the temples on the Capitoline Hill.
- 78 BC: Dies, perhaps of an intestinal ulcer, with funeral held in Rome.

Political offices
Preceded by Pompeius Strabo; L. Porcius Cato	Roman consul 88 BC; With: Q. Pompeius Rufus	Succeeded by Gn. Octavius; L. Cornelius Cinna
Preceded by M. Tullius Decula; Gn. Cornelius Dolabella	Roman consul 80 BC; With: Q. Caecilius Metellus Pius	Succeeded by P. Servilius Vatia; Ap. Claudius Pulcher
