= Aulus Pompeius =

Aulus Pompeius was the name of two Romans from the gens Pompeius, who were of plebs status. They lived during the Roman Republic.

== Brother to Quintus Pompeius Rufus, Consul 88 BC ==
Aulus Pompeius (flourished 2nd century BC) was the son Quintus Pompeius tribune of the plebs in 132 BC, who was an opponent to politician Tiberius Gracchus and was the younger brother to the above named. His mother is unknown. Aulus was named after his paternal great, grandfather of the same name.

Very little is known on this Aulus Pompeius. He was elected as tribune of the plebs in 102 BC. His wife's name is not known; they had a son Quintus Pompeius Bithynicus.

According to Greek Historian Diodorus Siculus, Aulus Pompeius died in 102 BC, apparently as a result of a curse placed upon him by Battaces, a Phrygian Priest. Diodorus recounts that Battaces was visiting Rome as an ambassador from the temple of "The Great Mother of the Gods" in Pessinus. Aulus Pompeius, as Tribune, forbade Battaces to wear a golden crown which formed part of his priestly regalia. This provoked a public argument between Battaces and Pompeius on the Forum rostra, during which Battaces cursed Pompeius for insulting The Great Goddess. Pompeius was "immediately struck with a burning fever, after which he lost his voice and was seized with quinsy, dying on the third day." The superstitious people of Rome viewed his death as the result of Battace's curse and thereafter allowed Battaces to wear his full regalia and treated him with respect and honour.

== Son of Quintus Pompeius Bithynicus ==
Aulus Pompeius Bithynicus (flourished 1st century BC) was the son to Senator Cicero’s friend Quintus Pompeius Bithynicus by an unnamed woman.

When dictator Gaius Julius Caesar was murdered in March 44 BC, he was serving as a praetor in Sicily. Out of fear of the situation in Rome, Pompeius wrote a letter to Cicero, requesting for his protection, which Cicero promised in his reply.

Pompeius was against the political rebel Sextus Pompeius, gaining control of Messina, however afterwards Pompeius allowed Sextus to control Messina, on the condition that Pompeius would have equal authority of government with Sextus. Afterwards, Sextus ordered Pompeius to be put to death.

== Sources for Articles ==
- Article title^{[usurped]}
- Article title^{[usurped]}
- Article title^{[usurped]}
- Article title^{[usurped]}
