= Quintus Pompeius =

Name of various Romans

Quintus Pompeius was the name of various Romans from the plebeian gens Pompeia during the Roman Republic.

== Consul of 141 BC ==
Quintus Pompeius A. f. (flourished 2nd century BC) was the son of an Aulus Pompeius. Little is known of his early life and political career.

The Roman Senator and Historian Cicero states that Pompeius first came to notice for his distinctive oratory. He was consul in 141 BC, during which, he was sent to Hispania as the successor of Quintus Caecilius Metellus Macedonicus in command of the Numantine War. Although he defeated Tanginus, after several defeats he and his troops were kept encamped before the walls of the town during the winter. With many soldiers dying from the weather and illness, Pompeius feared that the Roman Senate would summon him to Rome to answer to them for his conduct of the war. So Pompeius decided to make peace with the Numantines.

Pompeius publicly demanded that the Numantines surrender; however, privately, he only demanded the return of the hostages and payment of thirty talents. The Numantines, at first, were wary of this arrangement; however, they eventually agreed to Pompeius' terms.

In 139 BC, Marcus Popillius Laenas arrived in Hispania to assume command from Pompeius, and discovered Pompeius’ misconduct. Laenas then lodged a complaint against Pompeius in the Roman Senate. Pompeius continued with his lie during his hearing, but the senate voided his treaty with the Numantines and the war was renewed. Pompeius escaped punishment and was fortunate enough to obtain an acquittal when he was accused of extortion from the province he was governing in.

Pompeius was still popular among the Roman Plebs and was among the first plebeians, along with Quintus Caecilius Metellus Macedonicus, to be elected as censors. Pompeius’ wife was an unnamed Roman woman. His son was called Quintus Pompeius, an opponent of politician Tiberius Gracchus, and a daughter, Pompeia, who married a certain Gaius Sicinius.

== Opponent of Tiberius Gracchus ==
Quintus Pompeius (flourished 2nd century BC), was the son to the above. In 133 BC, he was an opponent to politician Tiberius Gracchus.

Pompeius stated that he lived near Gracchus and knew a certain wealthy Greek, Eudemus from Pergamon, who gave Gracchus a purple robe and royal treasures including a diadem. Eudemus also promised Gracchus more treasures, when his tribuneship had expired. Pompeius was elected tribune of the plebs in 132 BC and opposed Gracchus’ land reforms. Pompeius married an unnamed Roman woman and had two sons: Quintus Pompeius Rufus, consul of 88 BC and tribune Aulus Pompeius.

Note: This Quintus Pompeius above, consul in 141 and censor in 131, may have been the opponent of Gracchus.

== Consul of 88 BC ==
Quintus Pompeius Rufus (flourished 2nd and 1st century BC, died 88 BC), was the son to the above and eldest brother to tribune Aulus Pompeius. He appears to be the first in his family to bear the cognomen Rufus. However, the origins of him gaining this cognomen are unknown - although it may simply be that he was red-haired.

Cicero states that Pompeius was among the orators he had heard in his youth. Pompeius was a supporter of the Dictator Lucius Cornelius Sulla. In 100 BC Pompeius was tribune of the plebs; was praetor in 91 BC and served his consulship with Sulla in 88 BC. When the civil war broke out between Sulla and Gaius Marius, Pompeius was deprived of his consulship and fled to Nola, where Pompeius met up with Sulla and his army. Sulla took the place in the war against Mithridates and left Pompeius in charge of Italy.

While Gnaeus Pompeius Strabo was commanding the war against the Marsi tribe, the Optimates gave his army to Pompeius Rufus, the new consul. This caused Pompeius Rufus to be murdered by Strabo's soldiers.

Pompeius had married an unnamed Roman woman and they had a son a younger Quintus Pompeius Rufus, who married Sulla's first daughter Cornelia Sulla.

== Son-in-law of dictator Lucius Cornelius Sulla ==
Quintus Pompeius Rufus (flourished 2nd and 1st century BC, died 88 BC), was the son to the above. This Pompeius married Cornelia Sulla, the first daughter of dictator Lucius Cornelius Sulla. Cornelia and Pompeius had two children a son Quintus Pompeius Rufus and a daughter Pompeia, who married the future dictator Gaius Julius Caesar as his second wife. This Pompeius was murdered in the Roman Forum in 88 BC, by the supporters of politician Gaius Marius.

== Son of tribune Aulus Pompeius ==
Quintus Pompeius Bithynicus (108 BC-48 BC), was the son of the tribune Aulus Pompeius. He is the first member of the family to bear the cognomen Bithynicus. However, the origins of him gaining this cognomen are unknown.

Pompeius was a friend to Cicero, with whom he studied. Cicero considered this Pompeius as a great learner, who was an average orator. When the civil war broke out between Pompey and Julius Caesar, Pompeius supported Pompey. After the battle at Pharsalia Greece, he fled with Pompey, along with Pompey's remaining supporters in Egypt. On their arrival to Egypt, they were killed on the orders of Greek Pharaoh of Egypt Ptolemy XIII Theos Philopator. Pompeius married an unnamed woman and they had a son Aulus Pompeius Bithynicus.

== Praetor of 63 BC ==
Quintus Pompeius Rufus (flourished 1st century BC) was a praetor in 63 BC. It is unknown how this Pompeius was related to the above named. In 63 BC he garrisoned Capua against supporters of Catiline during his eponymous conspiracy.

Pompeius was the governor of the African Province in 61 BC, where he obtained the title of Proconsul and Cicero states he governed with integrity. In 56 BC, he bore witness to Marcus Caelius Rufus, who was in Africa at that time.

== Grandson of dictator Lucius Cornelius Sulla ==
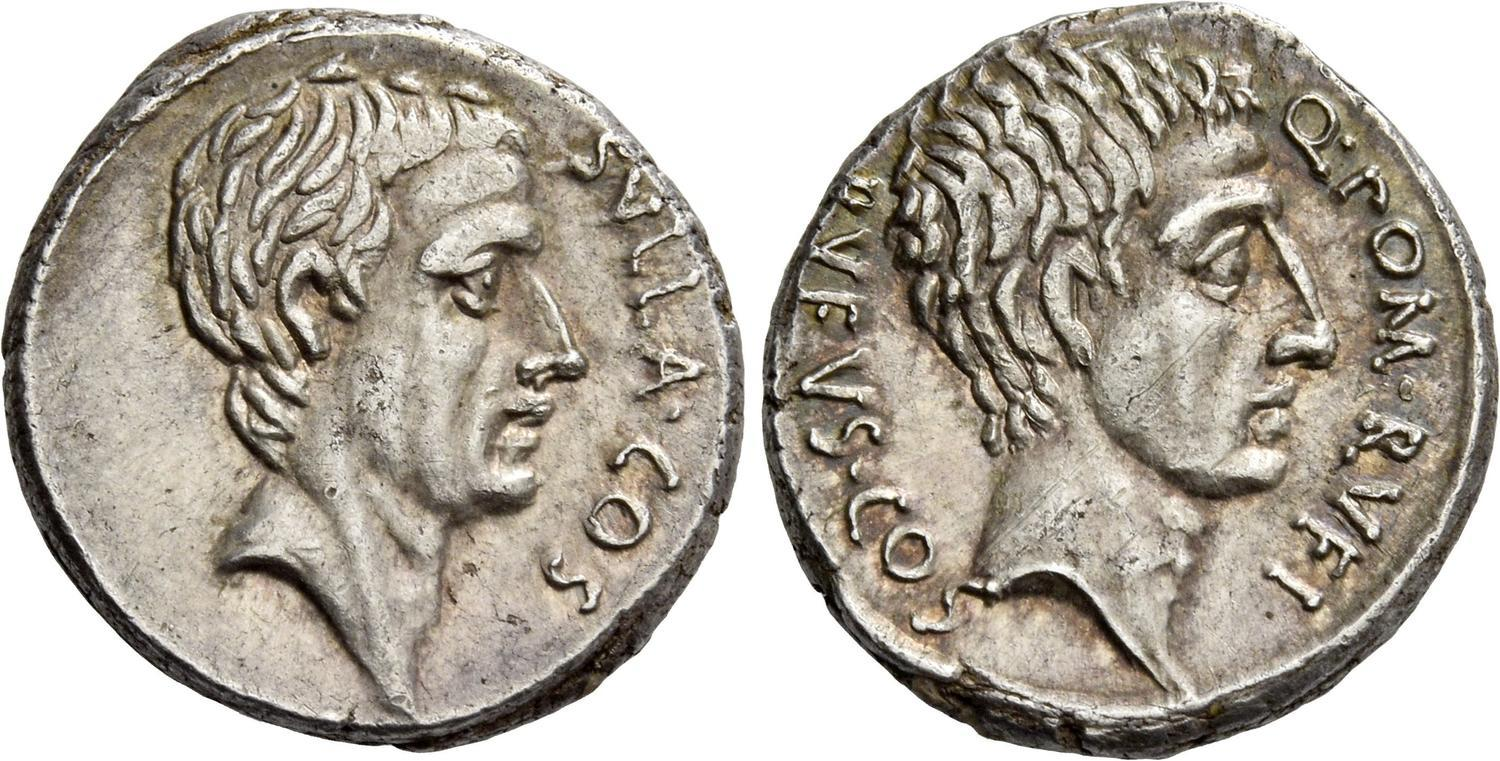
Coin issued by Pompeius depicting his two grandfathers Rufus and Sulla, both consuls

Quintus Pompeius Rufus (flourished 1st century BC) was the son of Quintus Pompeius Rufus, who was murdered in 88 BC, and Cornelia Sulla. His maternal grandparents were the dictator Lucius Cornelius Sulla and his first wife Ilia (or Julia). His paternal grandfather was the consul of 88 BC, Quintus Pompeius Rufus, while his paternal grandmother is unknown.

In 54 BC, he was accused by Marcus Valerius Messalla Rufus of bribing voters to gain the consulship. He was tribune of the plebs in 52 BC and was a supporter of triumvir Pompey.

Marcus Caelius Rufus accused Pompeius of violating laws of the Roman Senate which he had taken an active role in passing. He was condemned and was exiled to Campania. Also Caelius accused Pompeius of forcing his mother to give him the property that belonged to his father. The last instance in which the sources mention Pompeius is that in 51 BC the enemies of Pompeius spread false rumours that Pompeius murdered Cicero on his way to Cilicia.

== Sources ==
- "Dictionary of Greek and Roman Biography and Mythology, page 490 (v. 1)". 6 April 2007. Archived from the original on 6 April 2007.
- "Dictionary of Greek and Roman Biography and Mythology, page 473 (v. 3)". 7 October 2007. Archived from the original on 7 October 2007.
- "Dictionary of Greek and Roman Biography and Mythology, page 474 (v. 3)". 2 December 2010. Archived from the original on 2 December 2010.
- "Dictionary of Greek and Roman Biography and Mythology, page 475 (v. 3)". 29 January 2010. Archived from the original on 29 January 2010.
- "Plutarch • Life of Tiberius Gracchus". Penelope.uchicago.edu.
