= Quintus Pompeius Rufus (consul 88 BC) =

Roman politician, consul in 88 BC

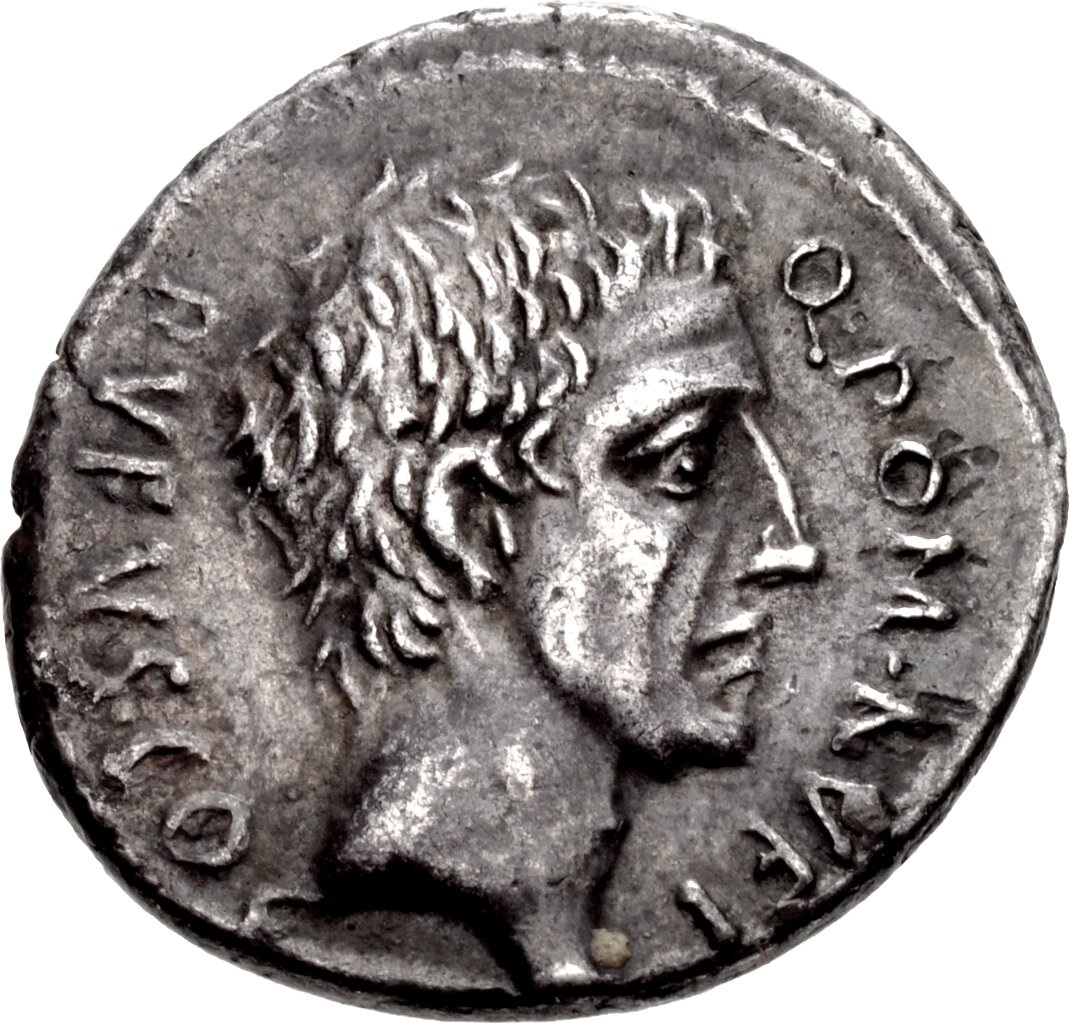
- Portrait in a denarius issued by his grandson, 54 BC
- Died: 88 BC
- Children: Quintus Pompeius Rufus

Quintus Pompeius Rufus (died 88 BC) was a consul of the Roman Republic in 88 BC. His colleague in office was the future dictator Sulla.

== Biography ==
The son of the Quintus Pompeius who was Plebeian Tribune in 132 BC, Rufus was elected Tribune of the Plebs in 99 BC. He, alongside Marcus Porcius Cato Salonianus, put forward a bill to recall Quintus Caecilius Metellus Numidicus from exile, but it was vetoed by Publius Furius. In 91 BC, Pompeius was elected Praetor urbanus, followed by his election as consul in 88 BC, alongside Lucius Cornelius Sulla.

The outbreak of the First Mithridatic War during their consulship saw the command of the war given to Sulla. This was opposed by the former consul and general Gaius Marius, who had a tribune of the Plebs, Publius Sulpicius Rufus, firstly bring forward a law which would enrol the Italian allies who had just received Roman citizenship across all of the Roman tribes, thereby giving Marius a large enough body of voters to pass a law to strip Sulla of his command. This was opposed by Pompeius and Sulla who declared a Justitium, during which no laws could be passed. During the riots which followed, Sulla fled, Pompeius's son was killed, and the consuls were forced to withdraw the Justitium. The people then passed the law which stripped Sulla of his command. Pompeius continued his attempts to support Sulla in Rome; however, Publius Sulpicius then had Pompeius stripped of his consulship, forcing him to flee to Nola, where Pompeius met up with Sulla and his army.

Pompeius accompanied Sulla on his march on Rome, and gave him his complete support in his actions against Sulpicius and the occupation of Rome. Together, the consuls passed a series of laws, including the exile of Marius and his supporters, a limiting of some of the powers of the tribunes, the expansion of the senate by adding some 300 additional senators, and the provision that all laws were to be reviewed by the Senate before being submitted to an assembly of the people. Most important of all was the provision that laws could now only be carried in the Centuriate Assembly. Sulla was soon put back in charge of the war against Mithridates, leaving Pompeius in charge of Italy.

The Senate then gave Pompeius the proconsular command of the ongoing Social War, with specific instructions to take over the armies of Gnaeus Pompeius Strabo, who was still in charge of the theatre of war against the Marsi tribe. Unwilling to hand over his command, Strabo incited a mutiny that led to Pompeius being stabbed to death by his own soldiers.

Pompeius had at least one child, his son Quintus Pompeius Rufus, who married Sulla's first daughter Cornelia Sulla. Pompeius was the brother of the tribune Aulus Pompeius. He appears to be the first in his family to bear the cognomen Rufus. However, the origins of him gaining this cognomen are unknown - although it may simply be that he was red-haired. Cicero states that Pompeius was among the orators he had heard in his youth. Pompeius also possibly held the position of Decemviri Sacris Faciundis until his death.

== Fiction ==
Pompeius is a character in the Colleen McCullough novel The Grass Crown. In it, Pompeius is murdered after Sulla writes to Gnaeus Pompeius Strabo, asking Strabo to have Pompeius killed, as Pompeius was unhappy with Sulla's actions in his march on Rome.

== Sources ==
- Broughton, T. Robert S. (1952). The Magistrates of the Roman Republic. Vol. II.
- Smith, William (1867). Dictionary of Greek and Roman Biography and Mythology. Vol. II.
- Smith, William (1849). Dictionary of Greek and Roman Biography and Mythology. Vol. III.

Political offices
Preceded by Pompeius Strabo; L. Porcius Cato	Consul of Rome; 88 BC; With: L. Cornelius Sulla	Succeeded by Gn. Octavius; L. Cornelius Cinna
