= Publius Sulpicius Rufus =

Roman reformer and plebeian tribune in 88 BC

- Born: 124 BC
- Died: 88 BC (aged 35–36)
- Occupations: Politician, orator, street agitator
- Office: Tribune of the plebs (88 BC)

Military service
- Rank: Legatus
- Wars: Marsic War (90–89 BC); Sulla's attack on Rome (88 BC)

Publius Sulpicius Rufus (124–88 BC) was a Roman politician and orator whose attempts to pass controversial laws with the help of mob violence helped trigger the first civil war of the Roman Republic. His actions kindled the deadly rivalry between Gaius Marius and Sulla, and provided the pretext for Sulla's unexpected march on Rome.

== Life ==
=== Background and early career ===
Publius Sulpicius Rufus was probably born in 124 BC. His precise background is unclear: It is unknown if he was related to the jurist and near-contemporary Servius Sulpicius Rufus, and, like him, he might not have been a patrician, despite their matching family names. It is likely, nevertheless, that he was of high birth, as he was personally acquainted to some of the most important aristocrats of the day. These included the orators Lucius Licinius Crassus and Marcus Antonius, of whom Sulpicius was a close friend as well as disciple. Sulpicius himself came to be regarded as one of the finest orators of his generation. Together with two highborn friends of his, Marcus Livius Drusus (son of the opponent of Gaius Gracchus) and Gaius Aurelius Cotta (uncle of Julius Caesar), Sulpicius formed a circle of "talented and energetic young aristocrats" in whom and the older generation of Roman senators placed great hope for the future.

In 95 BC, Sulpicius, with the encouragement and approval of the nobility, led an eloquent but ultimately unsuccessful prosecution of a former tribune of the plebs, Gaius Norbanus. This was his first major public performance, and he continued working as an advocate in the courts during the following years. He soon became involved in politics as a close ally of his friend, Livius Drusus, during the latter's eventful term as tribune of the plebs in 91 BC. Their circle seems to have identified with the cause of moderate reform within the establishment, which sought to maintain and perpetuate the ruling class's hold on power by making their rule more palatable to the ruled. To that end, Drusus as tribune had proposed several ambitious reforms which included the transfer of the state courts from the equestrian class to the Senate, the granting of full citizenship to Rome's restive non-citizen allies across Italy, and distribution of land and grain to the poor. To continue Drusus's work, his friends Aurelius Cotta and Sulpicius agreed to follow him on the tribunate in successive years, the former in 90 BC and Sulpicius himself in 89.

=== Failure of reform and war ===
Drusus's attempts at reform and catering to many diverse interests simultaneously ended in failure. The equestrians strongly resisted his proposals to deprive them of the courts, and Drusus was unable to reach a compromise that was acceptable to both them and the senatorial nobility. Shortly after a meeting of supporters at a villa of Lucius Licinius Crassus near Tusculum in September 91 BC, at which Sulpicius was present, Crassus himself died, depriving Drusus of his mentor and main supporter in the Senate. Drusus himself was murdered under mysterious circumstances shortly afterwards. Rome's Italian allies, with their desire for citizenship stymied, soon broke away in rebellion, beginning the Social War.

The outbreak of the Social War was followed by several politically motivated prosecutions as part of the equestrian class's reaction to Drusus's legislative proposals. One tribune, Varius, established a commission to prosecute Drusus's supporters on the charge that their attempts to appease the Italian allies with promises of citizenship had encouraged them to revolt. Sulpicius's friend, Cotta, who was supposed to succeed Drusus in the tribunate, was forced into exile to avoid condemnation, and Sulpicius himself narrowly avoided prosecution, probably because he then undertook military service against the Italian rebels. Sulpicius served in the conflict with the rank of lieutenant (legatus), but his activities during it cannot be known with certainty. (Note: Roman sources record one legatus named Sulpicius who distinguished himself in several campaigns against the insurgents throughout 90 and 89 BC, serving under the consul Pompeius Strabo during the latter year. Mattingly and Keaveney identified the man in question with Publius Sulpicius, but Dart preferred Servius Sulpicius Galba instead.)

=== Tribune of the plebs (89–88 BC) ===
Soon afterwards Sulpicius declared in favour of Gaius Marius and the populares, a move considered to be a surprising volte face by contemporaries: Cicero, for instance, remarks that 'the popular breeze carried Sulpicius, who had set out from an excellent position, further than he wished' He was deeply in debt, and it seems that Marius had promised him financial assistance in the event of his being appointed to the command in the Mithridatic Wars, to which Sulla had already been appointed. To secure the appointment for Marius, Sulpicius brought in a franchise bill by which the newly enfranchised Italian allies and freedmen would have swamped the old electors. The majority of the senate were strongly opposed to the proposal; a justitium (cessation of public business) was proclaimed by the consuls Sulla and Pompeius Rufus, but Marius and Sulpicius fomented a riot, and the consuls, in fear of their lives, withdrew the justitium. The proposals of Sulpicius became law, and, with the assistance of the new voters, the command was bestowed upon Marius, at the time a privatus holding no elected office.

Sulla, who was then at Nola, immediately marched upon Rome. Marius and Sulpicius, unable to resist him, fled from the city. Marius managed to escape to Africa, but Sulpicius was discovered in a villa at Laurentum and put to death; his head was sent to Sulla and exposed in the forum, and his laws annulled.

Sulpicius appears to have been originally a moderate reformer, who by force of circumstances became one of the leaders of a democratic revolt. Although he had impeached the turbulent tribune Gaius Norbanus in 95 BC, and resisted the proposal to repeal judicial sentences by popular decree, he did not hesitate to incur the displeasure of the Julian family by opposing the illegal candidature for the consulship of Gaius Julius Caesar Strabo Vopiscus, who had never been praetor and was consequently ineligible. Sulpicius' franchise proposals, as far as the Italians were concerned, were a necessary measure of justice; but they had been carried by violence.

Cicero as a young man went almost daily to see Sulpicius speak as tribune in the Forum (Brutus, 306), and judged him an able orator. Of his skills, Cicero says (Brutus, 210): "Sulpicius indeed was of all orators whom I have ever heard the most elevated in style, and, so to speak, the most theatrical. His voice was strong and at the same time pleasing and of brilliant timbre; his gesture and bodily movement extraordinarily graceful, but with a grace that seemed made for the forum rather than for the stage; his language was swift and of easy flow without being either redundant or verbose. He had fixed on Crassus as his model; Cotta had chosen rather Antonius. But Cotta lacked the force of Antonius, Sulpicius the charm of Crassus." Sulpicius left no written speeches, those that bore his name being written by a Publius Canutius. Sulpicius is one of the interlocutors in Cicero's De oratore.
