= Faustus Cornelius Sulla (quaestor 54 BC) =

Roman politician, son of Sulla

Faustus Cornelius Sulla (88 BC – 46 BC) was a politician of the Roman Republic. He was the son of the dictator Lucius Cornelius Sulla. He spent most of his career in the shadow of his father-in-law Pompey, whom he followed during the Civil War against Julius Caesar. He was killed soon after the battle of Thapsus in 46 BC.

== Life ==
=== Family background ===
Faustus was the only surviving son of the Roman dictator Lucius Cornelius Sulla and his fourth wife, Caecilia Metella, and thus was a member of one of the most ancient patrician families, the Cornelii. After his father's death in 78 BC, he and his twin sister, Fausta, were brought up by his guardian and father's friend, Lucullus.

Faustus married Pompeia Magna, daughter of Pompey the Great. Faustus accompanied Pompey on his Asian campaigns, and was the first to climb over the walls of the Temple of Jerusalem when it was stormed by Pompey in 63 BC. After his return to Rome, he gave gladiatorial games to celebrate his father in 60. At an unknown time before 57, Faustus Sulla became augur. As owner of the central slopes of Mount Falernus, his name became synonymous with the most esteemed wine in ancient Rome, Faustian Falernian.

=== Triumvir monetalis (56 BC) ===
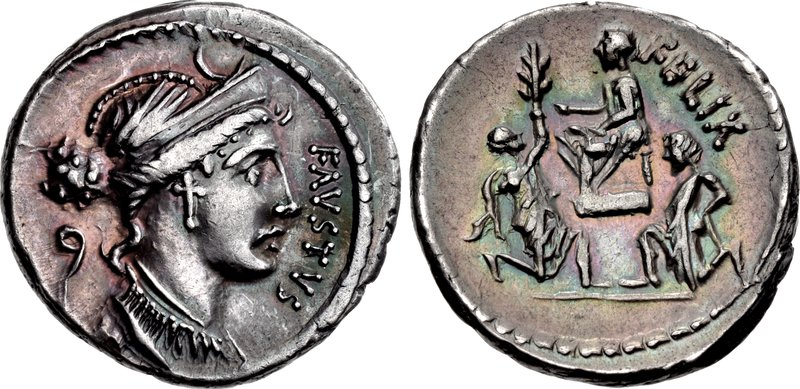
Faustus' denarius with the head of Diana and the Bocchus monument. The reverse is also a reproduction of Sulla's signet ring.

Faustus became triumvir monetalis in 56 BC, together with Lucius Marcius Philippus and Gaius Considius Nonianius. He had an important activity as moneyer, producing four types of denarius, which celebrate with an elaborate imagery both his father Sulla and father-in-law Pompey. Michael Crawford dated all the coins to 56, but other dates have been suggested: H. A. Grueber favoured 62 for the two denarii about Sulla, while Michael Harlan proposed 55. Both preferred 54 for those about Pompey, because they bore the letters SC, for senatus consulto, which makes Harlan think that they belong to Faustus' time as quaestor that year.

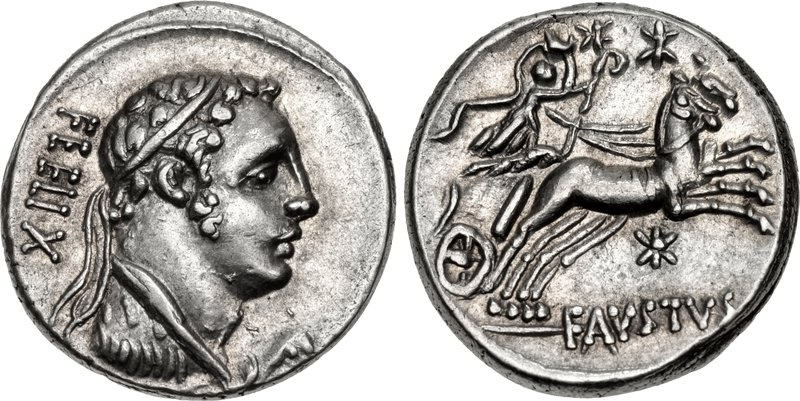
Denarius with the head of Hercules and Diana walking the heavens.

- Diana/Bocchus monument: This denarius features the head of Diana, to whom Sulla had paid a vow of gratitude after his victory at the Mount Tifata during Sulla's Civil War in 83 BC. Her presence on his coinage shows that Faustus thought he inherited his father's connection with her. The lituus refers to Faustus election to the augurate by 57 BC; its association with Diana likely means that he thought she was behind his success. The reverse depicts the capture of Jugurtha to Sulla that ended the Jugurthine War in 106. Jugurtha was betrayed by his father-in-law king Bocchus of Mauretania, who arrested him during fake peace talks and delivered him to Sulla. In 91 BC, Bocchus sent to Rome as a gift a monument with gilded statues that reproduced the scene of Jugurtha's capture, but upset Gaius Marius, who had been Sulla's commander and the official winner of the war. The scene on the coin is a reproduction of the statues, with Sulla shown enthroned, Bocchus at his feet and Jugurtha in chains, which also featured on Sulla's signet ring. This group of statues was placed on the Capitol, where Marius had built his trophy for winning the later Cimbrian War. This conflict through monuments resulted in the destruction of both groups of statues during the civil war of the 80s BC, but Julius Caesar as aedile rebuilt Marius' monument in 65 BC. Faustus' coin is therefore an attempt to restore his father's legacy in opposition to Caesar's restoration of Marius' memory.

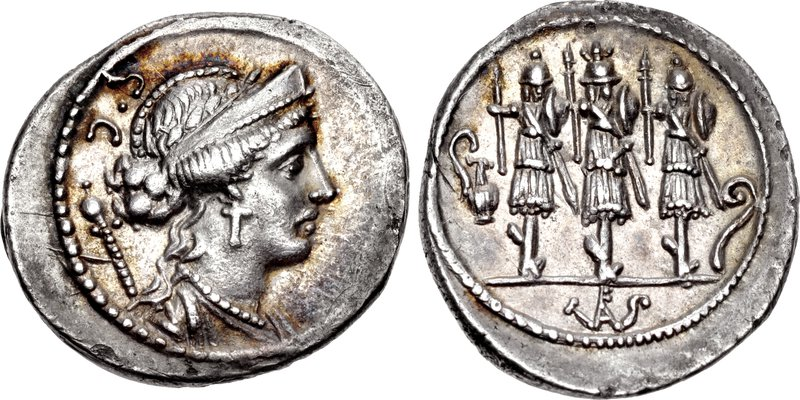
Denarius with Venus and the three trophies, which also featured Pompey's signet ring (itself inspired from Sulla's second ring).

- Hercules/Diana: This second denarius with the head of Hercules wearing the Nemean Lion's skin. Michael Crawford suggests that it also refers to the capture of Jugurtha, which the family tradition of Sulla associated with the favour of Hercules. The god also featured in Sulla's pantheon, as before celebrating his triumph over Mithridates in 82, he gave 10% of his fortune to Hercules. It was during the luxurious feat in honour of Hercules that Faustus' mother Caecilia Metella died. Sulla moreover restored the temple of Hercules Custos in Rome. The reverse shows Diana walking the heavens, another reference to her favour towards Faustus to get the augurate.
- Venus/three trophies: The remaining two denarii celebrate Pompey. Faustus signed his coins with a monogram that conceals his name, while the denarii commemorating his father bore his name "Faustus" and cognomen "Felix". The head of Venus is featured on the obverse, while the reverse shows three trophies. It is a copy of Pompey's signet ring, which is itself an imitation of Sulla's second signet ring made after the battle of Chaeronea, won in 86 BC against Archelaus during the First Mithridatic War. Sulla had erected two trophies on the battle site, which made a lasting impression the Greek world; they were still commented by Pausanias and Plutarch two centuries after the event. The lituus and jug on either side of the trophies allude to Pompey's augurate, which he received before 59 BC. The three trophies celebrates Pompey's victories over three continents (Africa, Europe and Asia), also celebrated during his triple triumph of 61 BC

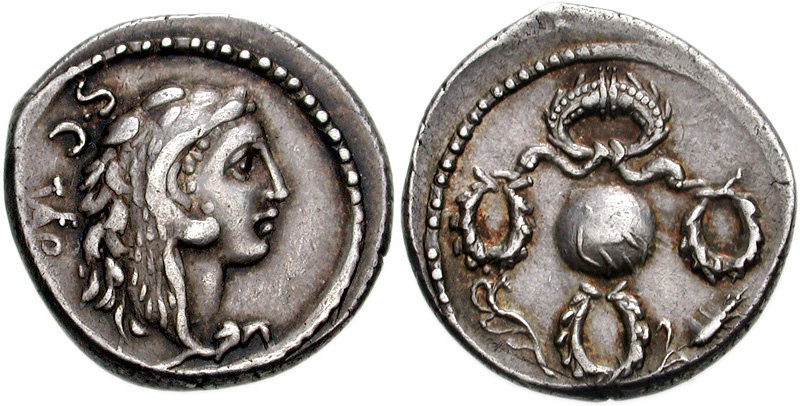
Denarius with Hercules and the four wreaths.

- Hercules/four wreaths: Like Sulla, Pompey was devoted to both Venus and Hercules, featured on this denarius, as he dedicated a temple for each god on the same day (12 August). However, this time Hercules is shown with the Lion's skin on his head, therefore associating him with victory. The reverse shows one large wreath at the top, which alludes to the gold crown (corona aurea) Pompey received in 63 BC from two tribunes of the plebs (Titus Labienus and Titus Ampius), as part of an unprecedented set of honours given to him. The three other smaller wreaths are another reference to the three triumphs of Pompey in 61 BC. The central piece of the reverse is a globe of the world, which was paraded by Pompey during the triumphs. On the bottom of the reverse, the corn-ear and aplustre allude to Pompey's commission of 57 BC, as he was tasked of the grain supply of Rome (cura annonae). Philip de Souza further suggests that the aplustre (an ornament of a ship stern) also refers to Pompey's campaign against the Cilician pirates in 67 BC.

== Later career ==
Faustus Sulla was quaestor in 54 BC. The senate commissioned him to rebuild the curia Hostilia in 52 which had been burned down after the riots which followed the murder of Clodius. After that, the curia was known as the curia Cornelia.

His career as an advocate was cut short, however, by the civil war between Pompey and Julius Caesar. He, as Lucullus' ward and Pompey's son-in-law, sided with the former. Faustus was at the Battle of Pharsalus in 48 BC, joining the leaders of his party in Africa subsequently. After the Battle of Thapsus, he tried to escape to Mauretania, but was caught and killed by Publius Sittius, a supporter of Caesar, in 46 BC.

With Pompeia he had at least two children: A son is attested named Faustus Cornelius Sulla the Younger. Faustus Cornelius Sulla Lucullus, suffect consul in AD 31, was his descendant.

== Bibliography ==
- Dictionary of Greek and Roman Biography, Mythology and Geography VII by W. Smith & C. Anthon.
- Michael Crawford, Roman Republican Coinage, Cambridge University Press, 1974. ISBN 978-0-521-07492-6
- H. A. Grueber, Coins of the Roman Republic in the British Museum, 3 vols, London, 1910.
- Michael Harlan, Roman Republican Moneyers and their Coins, 63 BC – 49 BC, London, Seaby, 1995.
- Federico Santangelo, Sulla, the Elites and the Empire, A Study of Roman Policies in Italy and the Greek East, Leiden/Boston, Brill, 2007. ISBN 978-90-04-16386-7
- Geoffrey S. Sumi, "Spectacles and Sulla's Public Image", Historia: Zeitschrift für Alte Geschichte, Bd. 51, H. 4 (4th Qtr., 2002), pp. 414–432.
- Philip de Souza, Piracy in the Graeco-Roman World, Cambridge University Press, 2002, pp. 149–178. ISBN 978-0-521-01240-9
- Brill's New Pauly. s.v. Cornelius [I 87].
