= Metrobius =

Ancient Roman actor and lover of Sulla

Metrobius (Ancient Greek: Μητρόβιος; lived 1st century BC) was an actor and singer in the Roman Republic. He was said to be the lover of Lucius Cornelius Sulla Felix, the famed general and dictator. Metrobius is mentioned twice by Plutarch in his Parallel Lives, who clearly disapproves of his relationship with Sulla. These excerpts are as follows.

"It was this laxity, as it seems, which produced in him [Sulla] a diseased propensity to amorous indulgence and an unrestrained voluptuousness, from which he did not refrain even in his old age, but continued his youthful love for Metrobius, an actor."

"However, even though he [Sulla] had such a wife at home, he consorted with actresses, harpists, and theatrical people, drinking with them on couches all day long. For these were the men who had most influence with him now: Roscius the comedian, Sorex the archmime, and Metrobius the impersonator of women, for whom, though past his prime, he continued up to the last to be passionately fond, and made no denial of it."

Though Sulla took other partners during his career, by Plutarch's account he remained in love with Metrobius until the end of his life.

== In fiction ==
In the historical fiction series Masters of Rome, by Colleen McCullough, the adolescent Metrobius is Sulla's sometime lover and later his client. He gives up the stage to accompany the former dictator Sulla into retirement in the year 79 BC.

In Raffaello Giovagnoli's novel Spartacus (1874) an actor named Metrobius accidentally overhears a conversation concerning a gladiator's plot and informs Julius Caesar about it.
