= Fimbrian legions =

Ancient Roman military unit (1st century BC)

Valerian/Fimbrian legions
- Active: 86 BC–66 BC
- Country: Roman Republic
- Branch: Roman Army
- Type: Roman Legions
- Size: 10,000 legionaries (2 legions)
- Engagements: First Mithridatic War; Second Mithridatic War; Third Mithridatic War

Commanders
- Notable commanders: Lucius Valerius Flaccus; Gaius Flavius Fimbria; Lucius Licinius Lucullus; Lucius Licinius Murena; Pompey

The Fimbrian or Valerian legions were two Roman legions which served and fought in all three wars against King Mithridates of Pontus, one of the Roman Republic's chief adversaries during the 80s, 70s and 60s BC. They became a body of long serving legionaries known for their fierce fighting reputation and also, more infamously, for mutiny and abandoning their commander. The legions take their name from the consul Lucius Valerius Flaccus, who first recruited them in 86 BC, and from his subordinate, Gaius Flavius Fimbria, who took command of the legions after inciting a mutiny and murdering Flaccus.

== Formation and first mutiny ==
In 86 BC, the populares, in control of the Roman government, dispatched suffect consul Lucius Valerius Flaccus with an army to the province of Asia as a political countermeasure to Lucius Cornelius Sulla, their main opponent. Sulla was campaigning in Greece and Macedon fighting against the forces of king Mithridates of Pontus (see: First Mithridatic War). Flaccus probably employed experienced troops, drawing his recruits from veterans of the recent Social War, but due to a lack of funds he was only able to raise two legions. In 86 or 85 BC, Flaccus took his legions through northern Macedonia and Thrace to the Hellespont (to cross over into Asia Minor). Flaccus was unpopular with his troops and by the time they had reached the Bosporus, Gaius Flavius Fimbria, one of his legates (lieutenants), taking advantage of Flaccus’s absence, incited a mutiny. Flaccus returned to his army, failed to put down the mutiny, tried to flee, but was hunted down and executed. Fimbria cut off his head and hurled it into the sea. The Valerians now became the Fimbrians.

== The First Mithridatic War ==
Following the mutiny, Fimbria and his men decided to continue their journey in the hopes of defeating Mithridates and redeeming their treasonous behavior [the mutiny] in the eyes of the Roman government. Arriving in Asia Minor, the Fimbrians plundered their way towards Pergamum, Mithridates's Asian capital. When Mithridates sent an army to protect the city, Fimbria managed to take the Pontic forces by surprise and annihilated them. With the relief army destroyed, he then laid siege to Pergamum. Upon learning of the defeat, Mithridates decided to head for Pontus in order to raise another army.

As Mithridates awaited his fleet at Pitane on the northwestern coast of Asia Minor, the Fimbrians surprised him again, appearing at the gates of Pitane and besieging the town. Soon after a Roman fleet arrived under the command of Lucius Licinius Lucullus, a legate of Sulla. Although this fleet could have completed the encirclement and prevented Mithridates from escaping Pitane, Sulla—the chief political opponent of Fimbria's faction in Rome—had signed a separate armistice with Mithridates and Lucullus did not interfere when the Pontic fleet arrived to evacuate the king.

=== Mutiny against Fimbria ===
After failing to capture Mithridates, Fimbria allowed his troops to pillage several cities, most prominently razing Ilium to the ground. Unfortunately for Fimbria, Sulla and his much larger army eventually approached and laid siege to Fimbria's camp. At this point Fimbria's men turned on him, once again deserting their commander. After a failed attempt at arranging Sulla's assassination, Fimbria committed suicide. When Sulla left Asia Minor to fight another civil war in Italy, he left the Fimbrians in Asia Minor to guard the Roman provinces.

== The Second Mithridatic War ==
In 83 BC one of Mithridates' generals, Archelaus, defected to the Romans. Archelaus convinced Lucius Licinius Murena, the Roman general tasked with protecting Bithynia, that Mithridates was planning another war with Rome. Murena marched his army, including the Fimbrians, across the river Halys into Pontic territory. This operation was less an invasion than a large-scale raid for plunder. The next year Murena repeated his actions, looting as many as 400 villages before Mithridates counterattacked. The Pontic king defeated the Roman force and drove Murena back to Bithynia. Subsequently, Aulus Gabinius, a representative of Sulla, arrived from Rome with instructions to cease all hostilities. This concluded the Second Mithridatic War.

=== Mytilene ===
In the aftermath of the Second Mithridatic War the city of Mytilene on Lesbos refused to pay tribute to Rome. According to the Romans the people of Mytilene also supported the Cilician pirates who were becoming a real menace in the Mediterranean. Lucullus, whom Sulla had left in charge of Asia province, launched an attack on the city, defeating Mytilene’s forces in a pitched battle before its walls. Since the Fimbrians were left under Lucullus’s command by Sulla, Lucullus probably used them in his attack on Mytilene. Sulla then sent one of his praetors, Marcus Minucius Thermus, to besiege Mytilene and finish the revolt before it could spread. Thermus used the forces available in the province of Asia to conduct his siege. Since the Fimbrians formed the permanent garrison of Asia, they were probably involved.

== The Third Mithridatic War ==
From 81 BC to 74 BC the Fimbrians served under several Roman governors in Asia Minor. When the Third Mithridatic War began, they were reported to be in the Roman province of Asia. Lucullus, now governor of Cilicia, was given the command of the war against Mithridates and sailed for Asia Minor. Landing at an unspecified location in Asia, he assumed command of the local Roman forces including the Fimbrians. According to Plutarch, Lucullus was the first genuine commander the Fimbrians had ever known. He refused to bribe them or bargain for their loyalty, instead insisting on discipline, rigor and military efficiency.

Lucullus had planned to invade Pontus before going after Mithridates himself, but he received word that his colleague, the proconsul Marcus Aurelius Cotta, had been defeated in battle and was now under siege in Chalcedon. Lucullus altered his plans and marched to Cotta's rescue. Meanwhile, Mithridates had moved on to besieging Cyzicus. When Lucullus arrived near Cyzicus, he decided against engaging the numerically superior Pontic army. Similarly, Mithridates was reluctant to risk battle against the capable Lucullus, who eventually managed to trap the king's army on the Cyzicus Peninsula in a counter-siege. The siege of Cyzicus ended when Mithridates finally withdrew his army, weakened by disease and starvation.

The next year Lucullus invaded Pontus. Here he finally allowed the Fimbrians to plunder and pillage. Mithridates' army disintegrated after the Battle of Cabira, whereupon the Pontic king fled east to the court of his son-in-law king Tigranes II of Armenia. When negotiations with Tigranes failed, Lucullus invaded Armenia and won victories at Tigranocerta and Artaxata. Unable to beat Lucullus in open battle, Tigranes and Mithridates began resorting to hit-and-run tactics. Winter forced Lucullus to march westward at the end of 68 BC. After 18 years of service and 960 miles (1,500 km) of marching in the last five years, the Fimbrians refused to accompany Lucullus when he marched to besiege Nisibis in northern Mesopotamia. They stayed on garrison duty in Pontus, where they were caught off guard by Mithridates when he suddenly returned to his kingdom in 67 BC at the head of a combined Armenian-Pontic army. It is unclear whether the Fimbrians fought at the disastrous Battle of Zela that year, but their continued existence as two legions in 66 BC suggests that they probably did not.

=== Mutiny against Lucullus ===
After the Roman disaster at Zela, Lucullus arrived back in Pontus. He wanted to finish off Mithridates once and for all, but his troops refused to march. According to Plutarch, Lucullus's men threw their purses at his feet, saying that he was the only one profiting from the war and telling him to continue it on his own. This latest mutiny was probably the result of machinations by Lucullus's brother-in-law Publius Claudius Pulcher, better known as Clodius. The Fimbrians also received word from the new proconsul of Asia that the Roman Senate had discharged them from further service to Lucullus. Ultimately, Lucullus extracted from his army a promise to protect Rome's remaining possessions in the East—but their days of campaigning under him were at an end.

== Fighting for Pompey and discharge ==
In 66 BC, the Roman general Pompey arrived in the East. Pompey had been given the command of the war against Mithridates and his allies. Pompey officially relieved Lucullus of his command and reenlisted most of his troops, including the Fimbrians. In Pontus Pompey caught up with and defeated Mithridates' army at the Battle of the Lycus, but the Pontic king escaped yet again. Unable to catch Mithridates, Pompey decided to attack Mithridates's allies: Tigranes, the Caucasian Iberians and the Caucasian Albanians. Before he advanced into Armenia, Pompey reduced the numbers of his army and granted some of his long-serving soldiers (almost certainly including the Fimbrians) their discharge, settling them in a new city called Nicopolis.

== Modern sources ==
- Philip Matyszak, Mithridates the Great, Rome's indomitable enemy, 2008.
- Lee Fratantuono, Lucullus, the life and campaigns of a Roman conqueror, 2017.
- John Leach, Pompey the Great, 1978.

== Ancient sources ==
- Cassius Dio, Civil Wars
- Plutarch, Life of Lucullus
- Plutarch, Life of Pompey
