= Lucius Valerius Flaccus (consul 86 BC) =

Roman politician and general

Consul of the Roman Republic, suffect
- In office January 86 BC – December 86 BC Serving with Lucius Cornelius Cinna
- Preceded by: Gaius Marius
- Succeeded by: L. Cornelius Cinna and Cn. Papirius Carbo

Personal details
- Born: Unknown
- Died: 85 BC Nicomedia
- Party: Marian-Cinnan faction
- Children: Lucius Valerius Flaccus

Military service
- Commands: First Mithridatic War

Lucius Valerius Flaccus (died 85 BC) became suffect consul of the Roman Republic in 86 BC when Gaius Marius, the consul prior (leading consul), unexpectedly died. He was elected to complete Marius's term in office. Marius had fought a series of civil wars against Lucius Cornelius Sulla, both leaders of their respective factions: the populares and the optimates. Flaccus was considered a staunch supporter of Marius and Lucius Cornelius Cinna; the leaders of the Marian-Cinna faction within the populares. Cinna was Marius's consular collegae and succeeded Marius as faction leader.

In 85 BC, Flaccus was assigned the governorship of the Roman province of Asia and the command of the war against Mithridates VI of Pontus. He mustered two legions and marched towards his province through Northern-Macedonia and Thrace. He was murdered at Nicomedia during a mutiny fomented by one of his senior subordinates, Gaius Flavius Fimbria.

Flaccus is also known for the Lex Valeria de aere alieno, his legislation on debt reform during the Roman economic crisis of the 80s BC. This legislation resolved the pressing economic crisis to the benefit of debtors by cancelling three-quarters of all outstanding debts, to the great disadvantage of their creditors.

== Family ==
Lucius Valerius Flaccus was the younger brother of Gaius Valerius Flaccus, who served as consul in 93 BC. (Note: Birth order is determined by the dates of the offices they held and by his brother carrying their father's name, as was conventional for the elder son.) Flaccus's son, also named Lucius Valerius Flaccus, was praetor in 63 BC and was defended by Cicero in the speech Pro Flacco. He was a cousin of the older Lucius Valerius Flaccus, who was consul in 100 BC and princeps senatus in 86 BC.

Inscriptional evidence has been found at Magnesia, but it could pertain either to Flaccus or his son, who was also a governor of Asia. The inscription describes a marriage to a daughter of Lucius Saufeius and a daughter named Valeria Paullina. (Note: Not the sister of Valerius Triarius, who had the same name.) His mother, a Baebia, is also commemorated. Flaccus is called ἀνθύπατος (anthupatos), a Greek term for proconsul.

== Life and career ==
Flaccus (Note: Unless otherwise noted, dates and offices are from Broughton, MRR, vol. 2, pp. 1, 18–19, 629.) was a military tribune, a senior military position, sometime before 100 BC. In 99 BC, he was curule aedile, a junior political position. On completion of his term he was unsuccessfully prosecuted by Gaius Appuleius Decianus. The charges were vague, and could be one of several politically motivated prosecutions in the 90s BC. The prosecutions continued the political unrest of the preceding decade, moving away from violence and to the law courts. (Note: For more on the case and its context, see Gaius Appuleius Decianus, especially "The case against L. Valerius Flaccus".) The trial did little to slow Flaccus's career. By 92 BC he was elected praetor. He was a praetor or propraetor in Asia around 92–91 BC, only a few years after his brother Gaius held the same post.

=== Governor of Asia ===
Map of Asia minor, 89 BC showing Roman provinces and client states (red), as well as Pontic territory (dark green).

Before the First Mithridatic War, during Flaccus's governorship of Asia, collections were made for games and a festival in his honour. The money was deposited at Tralles, but seems not to have been spent as planned. Cicero claims the town lent out the funds at interest for its own profit. Three decades later, Flaccus's son Lucius was governor of the same province. Cicero defended him against multiple charges of financial impropriety during his administration – when the Trallians accused him of embezzlement, Cicero claimed that Flaccus was merely "recuperating" the funds.

Flaccus and his brother Gaius, who held a promagisterial command in Asia around 96 BC, were recognised as patrons of the city of Colophon in Lydia. The two men are the first Roman governors known to be patrons of a free city, a practice that became common in the 60s BC.

=== Pro-Marian and suffect consul ===
In 87 BC, during the civil war, a cavalry garrison commander named Valerius handed Ostia to Marius ("treacherously," according to Plutarch); this Valerius may be Flaccus. During the 90s BC and into the mid-80s the Valerii Flacci seemed to be securely aligned with the Marian-Cinnan faction. When the elder cousin Lucius Flaccus held the consulship jointly with Marius in 100 BC, he was accused of being "more a servant than a colleague". Ernst Badian considers the Valerii Flacci "one of the foremost pro-Marian families".

In 86 BC, Lucius Flaccus replaced Gaius Marius as consul, following the latter's unexpected death in mid-January at the beginning of his seventh term. Flaccus's colleague in the consulship was Cornelius Cinna. That Flaccus replaced the faction leader, and most eminent Roman of the day, and served alongside the new faction leader, is a sign of both the esteem in which he was held and how firmly aligned to the Marian faction he was considered to be.

=== Credit crisis of the 80s BC ===
Flaccus's most controversial act as consul was the Lex Valeria de aere alieno, a radical restructuring of debt. Immediately upon entering office, Flaccus needed to confront Rome's credit crisis, which had been exacerbated by several factors. The credit system in Rome was based on the amount of money in circulation, stable land prices, and fides, which meant "general faith in the eventual repayment of loans and in the strength of the economy". This concept is similar to the perceived economic power of "consumer confidence" in the 21st century.

Land was the most common security for loans, but the large amount of land seized in the Social War (91–88 BC) had greatly lowered its value as collateral. With the loss of income from farms and estates, property values dropped, and creditors began to call in their loans. At the same time, general social turmoil resulted in coin hoarding. As the amount of money in circulation decreased, debtors found it increasingly difficult to pay off their loans or renegotiate the terms. The Roman economy also suffered due to the First Mithridatic War, which devastated Italian businesses in the east, greatly reduced trade and reduced tax revenues from the province of Asia.

Flaccus took drastic measures. With the silver sestertius valued at four copper asses, debtors were allowed to pay off their loans at a rate of one as on the sestertius. This three-quarters reduction in the debt burden allowed the publicani bankers to recoup at least some of their losses instead of dealing with mass defaults. The plan included government and publicani debts, easing the budget deficit and the liabilities of some of the bankers. The historian Sallust, born in the year of Flaccus's consulship, says that the conservative senatorial elites generally supported the plan. Writing a hundred years after the fact, during the era of Augustan prosperity, the historian Velleius Paterculus characterised Flaccus's plan as turpissima, meaning "utterly disgraceful".

=== Mutiny and murder ===
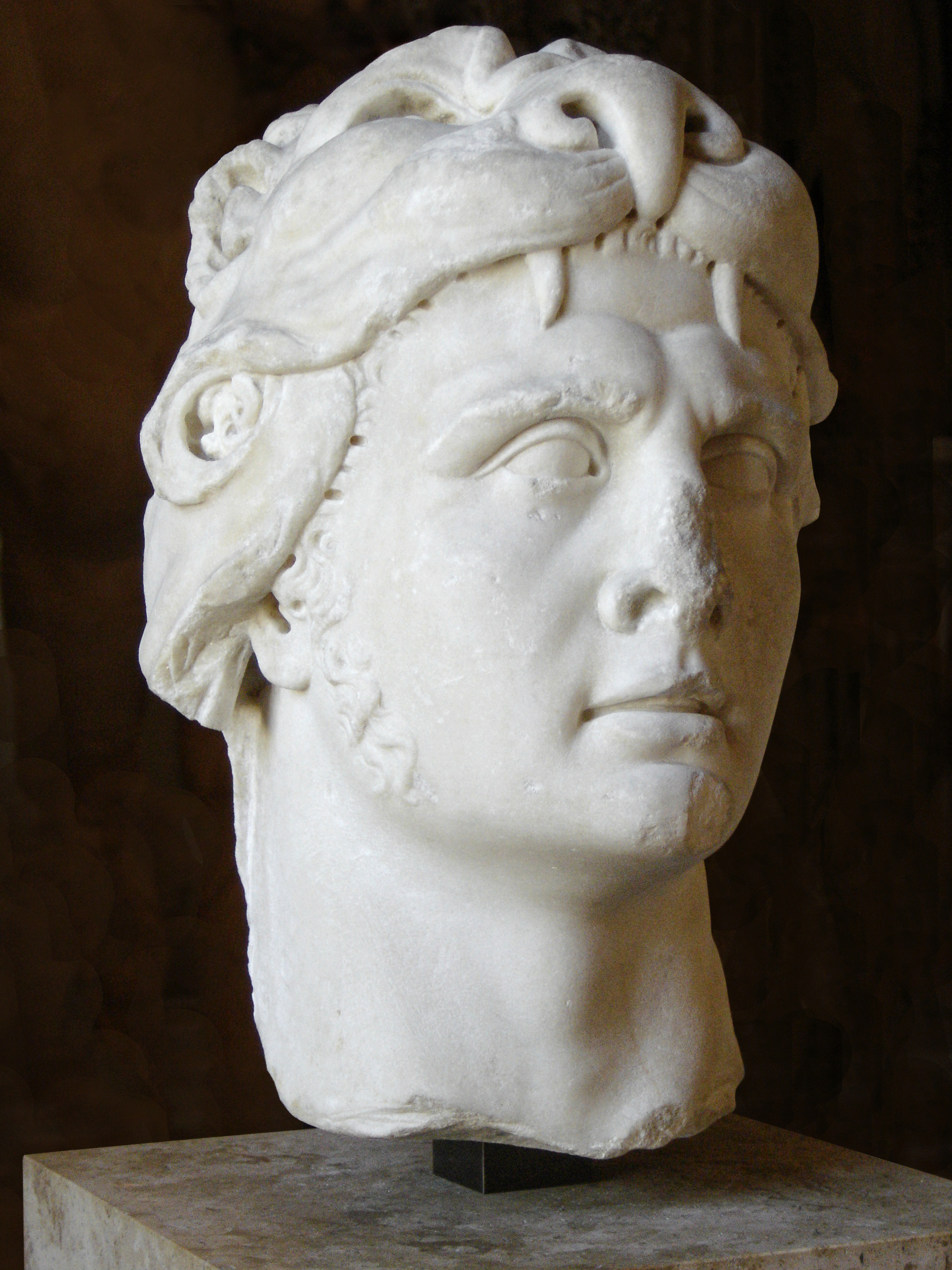
Bust of Mithridates IV

At the end of his term, Flaccus was made governor of the province of Asia as a countermeasure to Sulla's military operations and his diplomatic efforts toward Mithridates VI of Pontus, Rome's chief foreign adversary of the period. Although Sulla acted illegally and had even been declared a public enemy (hostis), Cinna apparently recognised that the threat of Mithridates required Roman co-operation.

Because the Cinnan government had a depleted treasury, it could fund only five legions. Two of them (sometimes called the Valerian legions) landed in Greece with Flaccus. Flaccus was outnumbered by Sulla's force of five legions, and lost a number of his troops in transit. An advance guard had been separated from the fleet, stranded by storms, and their ships burnt by Mithridates' Pontic navy. These men eventually make their way to Thessaly, where they promptly deserted to Sulla. The consular army marched across Epirus, Macedonia, and Thrace. They arrived in Byzantium with growing tensions within the ranks and officer corps. Flaccus's strongest legate, sometimes identified as his quaestor (treasurer), was Flavius Fimbria, a devoted Marian who seized on the discontent to make himself a rival for command. Fimbria's true motives are difficult to discern, and are sometimes considered irrational vehemence. However, he may have felt that Flaccus was too conciliatory toward Sulla. Flaccus may have played an early role in the attempts of his cousin, the leader of the Senate (princeps senatus), to come to a peaceful settlement with Sulla. At any rate, Sulla made no hostile advance toward Flaccus.

According to Diodorus, Fimbria led advance troops in the winter of 86–85 during the march through Thrace. He tried to win their allegiance by allowing them to plunder "the territory of allies as if it were enemy country, enslaving anyone they encountered". When the people complained of abuse, Flaccus rebuked Fimbria. This account is structured within a moral pattern that Diodorus favoured when interpreting events. Liv Mariah Yarrow notes: "The abuse of the allies by Fimbria in a ploy to gain power within the military structure actually leads to the disintegration of that military structure."

At the Hellespont Flaccus dismissed Fimbria with orders to return to Rome. Fimbria was replaced by Q. Minucius Thermus, whom Flaccus left in charge of Byzantium. (Note: Thermus was the brother of Marcus Minucius Thermus.) However, Fimbria continued to stir up the troops. They eventually defected to him, and he took over Thermus's command. Flaccus, who had advanced to Chalcedon in Bithynia, returned to deal with the situation. According to the most sensational account, Fimbria seized the fasces, the symbol of Flaccus's authority as consul, after which Flaccus fled to Chalcedon and then to Nicomedia. Fimbria pursued him, found him hiding in a well, had him beheaded, and assumed the consular command. Flaccus had been accompanied to Asia by his son Lucius, who was probably under age 20 at the time and on his first tour of military duty. After the death of his father, he escaped and joined his uncle Gaius in Gaul. In 84 BC Sulla crossed over from Greece into Asia and made peace with Mithridates. Sulla then turned his army against Fimbria, who, seeing that there was no chance of escape, committed suicide.

== Assessment ==
The 1st-century B.C. historian Memnon is highly critical of Flaccus, blaming his own arrogance and cruelty for the mutiny of his men. Appian finds both Flaccus and Fimbria reprehensible. Diodorus vilifies Fimbria, mentioning Flaccus only once and in a positive light. In assessing the character of Flaccus and his predicament in Asia, Michael Lovano attempts to filter through the biases of the sources:

[The ancient sources] reveal him to have been a strong disciplinarian, an experienced commander, well-acquainted with Asia through family contacts, and well-connected in the Cinnan regime. He was well-qualified for the Eastern mission. … What were Flaccus' orders regarding Sulla? Was he to attack him? If so, Flaccus would have been greatly outnumbered. Was he to cooperate with him? Sulla was still a public enemy. Was he to assume command from Sulla peacefully? It is unlikely Sulla would have complied.

== Effect on civil war ==
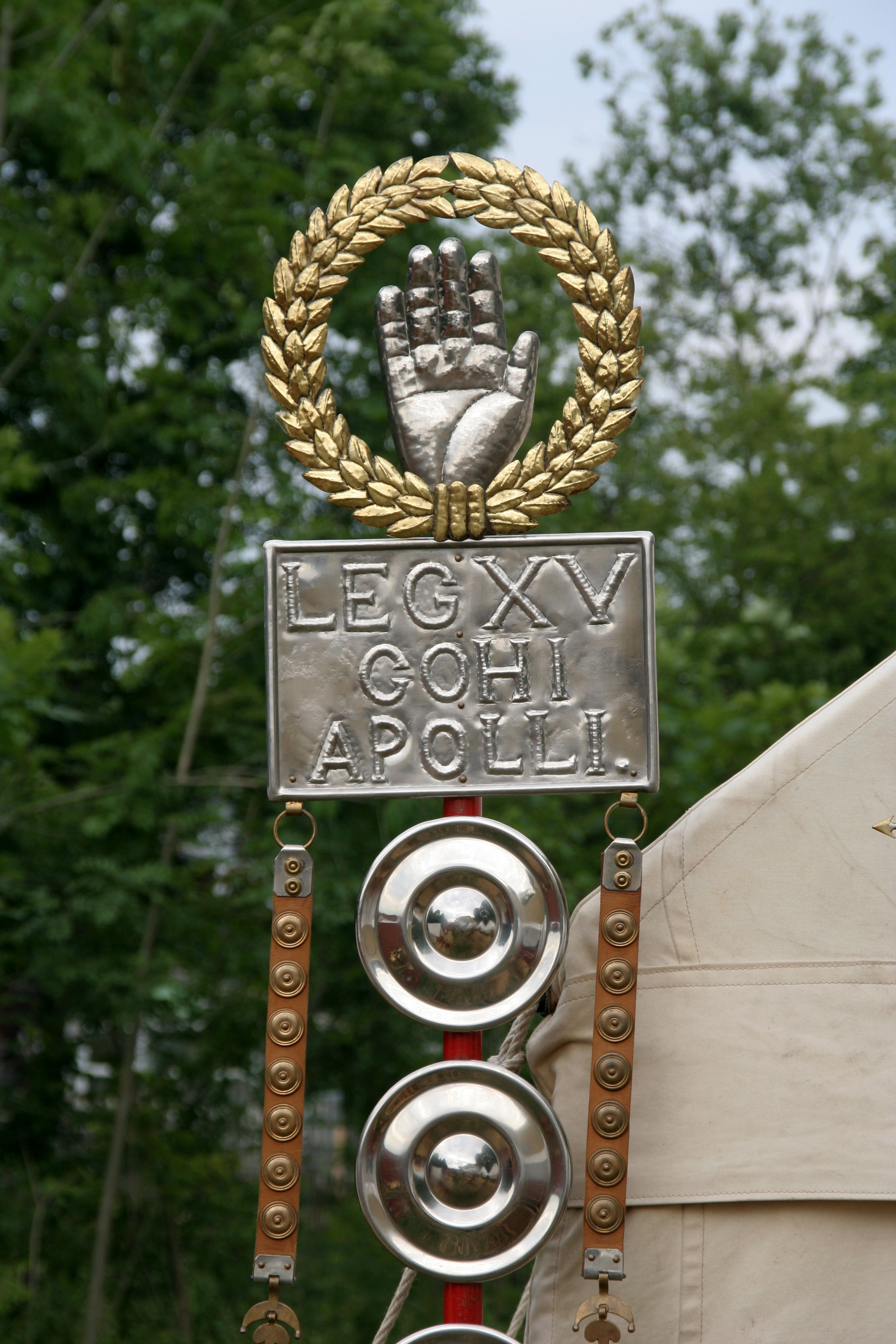
Roman legionary standard (replica)

See also Gaius Valerius Flaccus (consul): Role in civil war and Lucius Valerius Flaccus (consul 100 BC): Role in civil war.

At the time of his murder, Lucius's brother Gaius was governor of Gallia Transalpina and most likely of Cisalpina. He was also a recent, and possibly still current, governor of one or both of the Spanish provinces. He would thus have commanded the largest number of troops in the western half of the Republic. Gaius had either remained neutral or supported the Cinnan government until that point. It is probable that he started turning away from the Marian-Cinnan faction after a Marian killed his brother. He accepted Sulla's new regime once Sulla's troops were in Cisalpine Gaul. His nephew, who had joined him in Gaul after the assassination, served as his military tribune in 82 or 81 BC.

Gaius may have also been influenced by his cousin Lucius, the princeps senatus when the murder occurred. The elder Lucius had served with Marius as the consul for 100 BC, but after he failed to make peace with Sulla, he sponsored the legislation which established the dictatorship, a significant factor in the triumph of Sulla's faction.

== Sources ==
- Appian, History of Rome 12.9.60
- Brennan, T. Corey. The Praetorship in the Roman Republic. Oxford University Press, 2000.
- Broughton, T.R.S. The Magistrates of the Roman Republic, vol. 2, 99 B.C.–31 B.C. New York: American Philological Association, 1952.
- The Cambridge Ancient History (Cambridge University Press, 2nd edition 1994), vol. 9.
- Duncan, Mike (2017). The Storm before the Storm. New York: PublicAffairs. ISBN 978-1-5417-2403-7.
- Lovano, Michael. The Age of Cinna: Crucible of Late Republican Rome. Franz Steiner Verlag, 2002.
- H.H. Scullard, From the Gracchi to Nero: A History of Rome from 133 B.C. to A.D. 68 Routledge, 1988.

== Notes ==
Political offices
| Preceded by Gaius Marius | Roman consul 86 BC (suffectus); With: L. Cornelius Cinna | Succeeded by L. Cornelius Cinna; Cn. Papirius Carbo |
