= Bellum Octavianum =

Civil war in 87 BC between the consuls of the Roman Republic

War of Octavius
- Part of the crisis of the Roman Republic
Date	87 BC
Location	Italy, Roman Republic
Result	Cinnan victory

Belligerents
Cinnans	Octavius and Senate

Commanders and leaders
Lucius Cornelius Cinna; Gaius Marius; Quintus Sertorius; Gnaeus Papirius Carbo; Marius Gratidianus	Gnaeus Octavius †; Pompeius Strabo #; Metellus Pius; Lucius Cornelius Merula ‡‡

Strength
Modern estimate: up to 120,000 men	Modern estimate: 60,000 men

The Bellum Octavianum (Latin for "War of Octavius") was a Roman republican civil war fought in 87 BC between the two consuls of that year, Gnaeus Octavius and Lucius Cornelius Cinna. Cinna was victorious by late 87 BC.

Hostilities broke out after Octavius opposed Cinna's attempts to distribute the Italian citizens enfranchised after the Social War into all voting tribes and to recall the outlawed Gaius Marius from exile. Cinna was ejected from the city after a fight in the Forum. He began touring Italy to recruit men, while the Senate in Rome replaced him with Lucius Cornelius Merula, a priest of Jupiter, in the consulship. Cinna took control of the Roman army stationed at Nola and was joined by the exiled Marius. Octavius won the support of the two other Roman generals in the field in Italy, Metellus Pius and Pompeius Strabo; the Samnites, who were formally at war with Rome, joined Cinna. Peter Brunt estimates that Octavius had some 60,000 men at his disposal while Cinna had around twice that.

Marius captured and sacked Ostia, cutting off Rome from supplies, and Cinna went on to besiege the city. Cinna's lieutenants Quintus Sertorius and Papirius Carbo fought inconclusively against Octavius and Strabo near the Janiculum. After Strabo died of natural causes, his troops defected to Cinna, forcing the consul Octavius to sue for peace. Cinna and Marius entered Rome. They killed a number of their opponents and arraigned others in manipulated trials. Octavius was killed; Merula committed suicide; Catulus, a personal enemy, was put on trial but killed himself before conviction. Cinna and Marius had themselves elected consuls; their faction dominated Italy until Sulla's civil war in 83 BC.

== Background ==
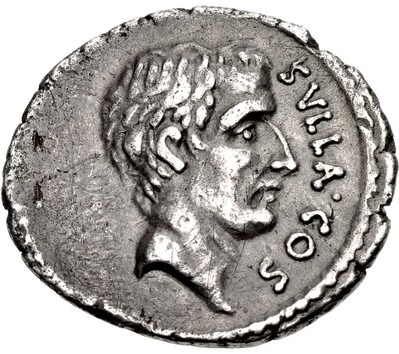
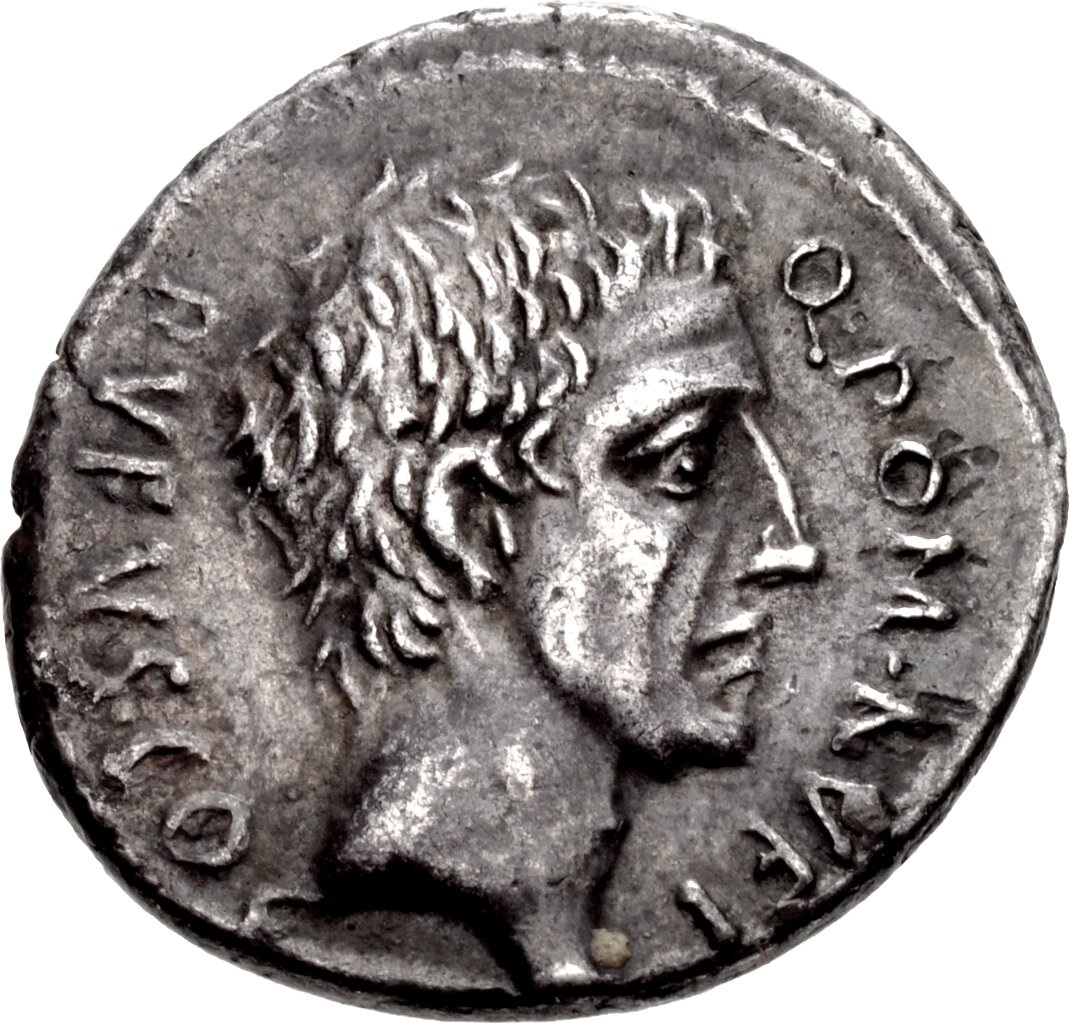
A coin depicting the consuls of 88 BC, Lucius Cornelius Sulla and Quintus Pompeius Rufus

The main question in Roman politics of the year 88 BC was how the new citizens – the Italians who had accepted Roman citizenship in place due to the Social War – should be enfranchised. Under the lex Julia of 90 BC the mass of new citizens would be packed into ten or eight new tribes who would be outvoted by the existing thirty-five tribes of old citizens. The plebeian tribune Publius Sulpicius Rufus brought legislation to distribute the new citizens among the existing thirty-five tribes.

The consuls of the year 88 BC were Lucius Cornelius Sulla and Quintus Pompeius Rufus. Sulla had been a successful general in the Social War and other prior conflicts. In the face of resistance to his controversial proposal, Sulpicius assembled street mobs that – in a brawl – killed the consul Pompeius' son and drove both of the consuls from the city. Plutarch claims that Pompeius was deprived of his consulship though this is doubtful. More concretely, Sulpicius passed legislation depriving Sulla of his command against Mithridates and illegally assigned it to his old rival, Gaius Marius, who was at the time a private citizen. At the time this was seen as infringing on the consul's traditional prerogative to have primacy in leading Rome's armies.

In response, Sulla induced his troops at Nola to restore order in the city, arguing that Sulpicius' bill was an assault on the consuls' authority and that of the people who had elected them. Along with the argument that Marius could replace the army with new levies, depriving the soldiers of the expected booty from the East, he led the army toward Rome while all of his officers deserted him (save Lucullus). The military tribunes which Marius sent to assume command were killed and a later set of envoys from the Senate assaulted. With Rome defenceless, Sulla marched into the city amid a storm of popular outrage. His men, shamed by the citizenry, almost broke before Sulla urged them on personally. Sulla called the Senate and induced them to declare Marius, Marius' son, Sulpicius, and nine others outlaws. Condemned to death without trial, the exiles all successfully fled the city (except Sulpicius who was betrayed and killed).

Sulpicus' laws were invalidated on the basis that they were passed by force, restoring Sulla to the command against Mithridates and annulling the distribution of new citizens among the thirty-five existing tribes. After passing some other reforms, Sulla left the city for Capua after conducting elections. His broad unpopularity, however, was keenly felt when his candidates were all rejected at those elections, which chose Gnaeus Octavius and Lucius Cornelius Cinna as consuls-designate. Sulla forced the two men to uphold his laws by oath; this proved an ineffective restraint.

== Outbreak ==
When Sulla's unprecedented consulship ended, Octavius and Cinna were inaugurated consuls. By this time, Cinna had induced a plebeian tribune to prosecute Sulla and prevent him from leaving Italy. This failed as Sulla ignored the tribune's demands that he return to Rome and was regardless immune from prosecution due to his proconsular imperium; he departed rapidly for the war on Mithridates. Cinna also renewed calls for the new Italian citizens to be distributed among the existing thirty-five tribes.

Along with a Cinnan bill to recall those exiled by Sulla, this brought him into conflict with Octavius. Octavius secured a majority of the tribunes to veto Cinna's distribution and recall bills, which started a riot attacking the tribunes and itself may have triggered a senatus consultum ultimum. After an incident between the two consuls' supporters turned violent – Octavius' supporters allegedly massacred some of the new citizens marching with Cinna – Cinna left the city to raise an army joined by a majority of the plebeian tribunes and Quintus Sertorius.

When Cinna departed the city, the Senate declared him to have abdicated his consulship and to be hostis (an enemy of the state). A senatus consultum ultimum was probably moved. In place of Cinna, Lucius Cornelius Merula, who was the high priest of Jupiter (flamen Dialis), was made consul. Because the restrictive religious obligations of the priesthood, Merula was largely unable to execute his consulship, leaving Octavius as de facto sole consul.

Cinna, meanwhile, reached Nola: Sulla had left troops there to continue the siege. Bribing the officers and troops to let him make an address, he then made an appeal to them where he threw down his consular regalia and addressed the men as citizens. Calling on them as citizens to vindicate his election and arguing that not to do so would create a tyrannical senatorial oligarchy who would be able to rule without reference to the people, the soldiers lifted Cinna back to his curule seat and restored his symbols of consular office. The army's officers then administered an oath of loyalty to Cinna.

While Cinna continued to raise soldiers around the countryside in the south, Octavius and Merula fortified the city and began to raise troops in the north and Cisalpine Gaul. Marius, hearing news of this conflict while in Africa, landed in Etruria and joined Cinna. Marius raised some 6,000 men and entered Cinna's camp at their head. Pompey Strabo, who had been called by Octavius and the Senate to defend the city, encamped near Rome at the Colline Gate but remained aloof to play both sides.

== Siege of Rome ==
Cinna's plan was to divide this forces into three. His force would encamp near the Colline Gate, one force under Sertorius would encamp up the Tiber, and Marius would encamp near the city gate toward Ostia, the Porta Ostiensis. The three forces would then starve the city into submission. Two detachments also then engaged in offensive action: one under Marius besieged and took with the support of defectors the port of Ostia and one under Marcus Marius Gratidianus took Ariminum to prevent enemy reinforcement from Cisalpine Gaul.

Pompey Strabo, unable to reach an agreement with Cinna and Marius, fought Sertorius near the Janiculum, while the Senate sought to raise more men by offering citizenship for all Italians who had surrendered. This appeal raised only sixteen cohorts, far fewer than expected. The Senate then instructed the proconsul Quintus Caecilius Metellus Pius (previously praetor in 90 BC) to make peace with the Samnites he was fighting if possible with honour and relieve the city. The Samnites pushed for extremely generous terms which Metellus rejected; Cinna, in separate negotiations, instead gave in to all their demands, securing their support. Octavius won a victory over Cinna at the Janiculum, but Pompey Strabo prevented Octavius from following up on his success, withdrawing his troops under Octavius' command.

After plague struck Octavius and Pompey Strabo's armies, killing Pompey Strabo and thousands of their men, the Cinnans executed their plan to starve the city out. Marius took Antium, Aricia, Lanuvium, and other towns, while Cinna moved down the via Appia to secure foodstuffs. The troops under Octavius attempted to hand Metellus the command, but Metellus refused to infringe on the consul's rights. Metellus attempted to negotiate with Cinna; Octavius objected and Metellus then fled the city for Africa. While Marius continued to tighten the siege, Cinna offered freedom to the slaves who would join him. The Senate, fearful of famine in the city, then sued for peace. After the Senate's envoys failed to secure an audience, unable to answer Cinna's question as to whether they approached him as consul or as private citizen, Cinna's forces then encamped outside the city's walls.

Merula, protesting that he had never wanted the consulship, abdicated on his own accord and the Senate sent envoys to address Cinna on his consular tribunal. Asked to forswear killing on entrance to the city, Cinna refused but indicated that he would not cause anyone's death while Marius stood silently beside him. The two men were invited to enter the city but Marius refused and cited his exile. Cinna's first action after entering the city was to bring legislation overturning all of Sulla's exiles; Marius then entered the city. Octavius, refusing to flee the city, was then killed on his curule chair set up in the Janiculum; his head was then cut off and displayed on the forum.

== Aftermath ==
After his victory, Cinna sought to punish those who had acted contrary to law. Marius, however, pursued his personal and political enemies. Among them were Gaius and Lucius Julius Caesar, Publius Licinius Crassus and his son, along with the orator Marcus Antonius. The killings were not broad across the political class and likely reflected Marius' personal grudges; nor were the victims then linked to Sulla. There is no evidence that the purge targeted the victim's families. Merula and Quintus Lutatius Catulus committed suicide prior to convictions at trial. Sulla himself was also declared hostis; his laws were annulled and properties were confiscated, leading to his family fleeing the city for Greece.

While later sources – including Dio, Velleius, Livy, Diodorus, and Plutarch – claim that Cinna and Marius butchered and ravaged their way through the city for five days, these claims are likely Sullan propaganda filtered through Sulla's memoirs. Cicero, more contemporaneous and speaking to men who lived during the Cinnan regime, indicates that Cinna and Marius targeted only political enemies and did not threaten all of Rome's inhabitants or otherwise sack the city.

At the end of the year, Cinna and Marius presented themselves before the comitia centuriata as the only candidates for the consulship and were duly returned in irregular elections. Inaugurated at the start of 86 BC, this was Marius' seventh consulship. On his first day as consul he ordered one former tribune thrown from the Tarpeian Rock. He started planning for his Mithridatic campaign but within a fortnight he was dead. Cinna survived the following years, securing his own iterative re-election through to 84 BC. Replacing Marius as his consular colleague was first Lucius Valerius Flaccus and then Gnaeus Papirius Carbo. Flaccus was dispatched within the year to Greece to fight Mithridates and assume command over Sulla.

The Cinnan regime started provisions for a census, which was conducted in 86 BC by Lucius Marcius Philippus and Marcus Perperna. They registered, however, only some 463,000 citizens, which meant most of the new citizens could not have yet been registered into tribes. For all his rhetoric at the start of the year 87 BC, Cinna and his allies seemed very willing to continue the existing state of affairs and made no efforts to complete a full registration. The threat of Sulla in the east remained when the Roman army sent to replace him in command fell into disarray after its general, Lucius Valerius Flaccus, was assassinated by his quaestor. Cinna met his end at the hands of mutinous troops when seeking to pass into Epirus to confront Sulla in 84 BC. Sulla then returned to Italy in the spring of 83 BC at the head of Mithridatic veterans, triggering a new civil war.
