= Hypsicratea =

Concubine of Mithridates VI of Pontus

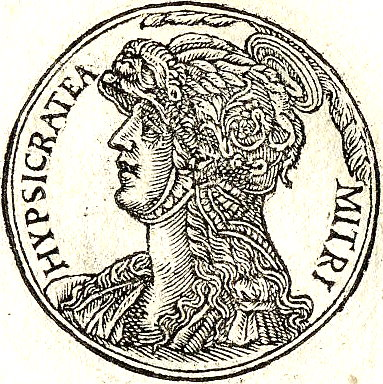
Hypsicratea from Promptuarii Iconum Insigniorum

Hypsicratea or Hypsikrateia (Ancient Greek: Ὑψικράτεια, fl. 63 BC), was the concubine, and perhaps wife, of King Mithridates VI of Pontus.

== Life ==
Nothing is known of the family background of Hypsicratea. All the information about her relates to the final years of Mithridates' reign.

During the Battle of the Lycus, Hypsicratea and Mithridates led a charge of 800 cavalry against the Roman forces led by Pompey. However, in the battle, the two, along with two other unnamed companions, were separated from the rest of their cavalry and escaped, while Pompey killed or captured nearly ten thousand of Mithridates' troops.

After their escape, Hypsicratea followed Mithridates north, along the east coast of the Black Sea, to Sinora, along with around 3000 other survivors of the Battle of the Lycus that joined them later. Ancient sources neglect to mention Hypsicratea after this point.

She may have died during an uprising in Phanagoria in 63 BC.

Plutarch wrote that she was:

"...always manly (androdes) and extremely bold, the king consequently liked to call her Hypsicrates. At that time taking possession of a cloak and horse of a Persian man she neither flagged in body before the distances they ran nor did she weary of tending the body and horse of the king, until they came to a place called Sinora, which was full of the king's coins and treasures."

Valerius Maximus reports:

"The Queen Hypsicratea too loved her husband Mithradates, with all the stops of affection let out, and for his sake she thought it a pleasure to change the outstanding splendor of her beauty for a masculine style. For she cut her hair and habituated herself to horse and arms, so that she might more easily participate in his tools and danger. Indeed when he was defeated by Cn. Pompey, and fleeing through wild peoples, she followed him with body and soul equally indefatigable. Her extraordinary fidelity was for Mithridates his greatest solace and most pleasant comfort in those bitter and difficult conditions, for he considered that he was wandering with house and home because his wife was in exile along with him."

== Epitaph ==
In 2004, a brief epitaph of Hypsicratea was discovered by archaeologists in Phanagoria. The epitaph uses the masculine version of her name, Hypsicrates - thus confirming what Plutarch said about her. This also suggests Hypsicrates was the name by whom she was publicly known, rather than simply a pet name given by Mithridates. It calls her "wife of King Mithridates Eupator Dionysos."

The epitaph was inscribed on a block of marble, which formed part of the base of a bronze statue of Hypsicratea. The statue has not survived, and it is impossible to know how it depicted her.

== Sources ==
- Plutarch, Life of Pompey, 32.8
- Valerius Maximus, Factorum et dictorum memorabilium libri, 4.6.ext2

== Bibliography ==
- Bernard, Paul (2006). "Les fouilles de Phanagorie: nouveaux documents archéologiques et épigraphiques du Bosphore". Comptes rendus des séances de l'Académie des Inscriptions et Belles-Lettres: 280–288.
- Facella, Margherita (2017). TransAntiquity: Cross-Dressing and Transgender Dynamics in the Ancient World. Routledge. pp. 114–116. ISBN 9781138941205.
- Gabelko, Oleg (2013). "A Historical and Epigraphic Commentary on Hypsicrateia's Epitaph". Ruthenia Classica Aetatis Novae: 173–184.
- Heinen, Heinz (2012). "Hypsikrateia/Hypsikrates: Travestie aus Liebe. König Mithridates Eupators Page und eine neue griechische Inschrift aus Phanagoreia/Ruẞland". Jahrbuch der Akademie der Wissenschaften in Göttingen. 2: 215–238.
- Mayor, Adrienne (2014). The Amazons : lives and legends of warrior women across the ancient world. Princeton. pp. 339–353. ISBN 9780691147208.
- Mayor, Adrienne (2010). The Poison King : The Life and Legend of Mithradates, Rome's Deadliest Enemy. Princeton. pp. 320–323. ISBN 9780691150260.
- Yarrow, Liv Mariah (2021). Roman Republic to 49 BCE : using coins as sources. Cambridge: Cambridge University Press. p. 77. ISBN 9781107013735.
