= Lucius Cornelius Cinna =

1st-century BC Roman consul

- Born: Before 130 BC
- Died: Early 84 BC; Ancona, Italia
- Cause of death: Killed in mutiny
- Occupations: Politician and soldier
- Office: Consul (87–84 BC)
- Spouse: Annia
- Children: Cornelia (wife of Caesar); Cornelia (wife of Cn. Domitius Ahenobarbus); L. Cornelius Cinna
- Military career
- Wars: Social War; Bellum Octavianum (87 BC); Sulla's civil war X

Lucius Cornelius Cinna (before 130 BC – early 84 BC) was a four-time consul of the Roman republic. Opposing Sulla's march on Rome in 88 BC, he was elected to the consulship of 87 BC, during which he engaged in an armed conflict – the Bellum Octavianum – with his co-consul, Gnaeus Octavius. Emerging victorious, Cinna initiated with his ally, Gaius Marius, the murders of their enemies. In the aftermath, he dominated the republic for the next three years, serving continuously as consul.

While his domination was not complete – he largely contented himself with securing the consulship for himself and allies – his political rule set a "crucial precedent" for later strongmen in the republic. Through 85 and 84 BC, he prepared for war against Sulla, who was soon to return from the First Mithridatic War. Cinna was killed by his own troops, who mutinied during his attempt to cross the Adriatic at Ancona early in 84 BC.

== Early life and family ==
Cinna was born some time before 130 BC into a patrician family that was not recently distinguished. Theodor Mommsen considered the Cornelii Cinnae to be plebeians, but most modern authors view them as patricians. The consul of 127 BC has been identified as his father, though the connection is not certain.

He married a woman named Annia, with whom he had three children: two daughters and one homonymous son. His eldest daughter married Gaius Julius Caesar (the dictator and consul of 59 BC), probably during Cinna's second consulship in 86 BC; his younger daughter married Gnaeus Domitius Ahenobarbus (who died in 81 BC). Cinna's homonymous son escaped Sulla's retribution by fleeing to Quintus Sertorius – one of Cinna's legates – after Sulla's civil war, before being given amnesty in the lex Plautia and returning to Rome. Afterwards, he became praetor in 44 BC.

Before 90 BC, Cinna must have served as praetor. It is known that he also served during the Social War; T.R.S. Broughton believed Cinna was one of the legates who led the successful Roman offensive against the Marsi during the war in 89 BC. Little is known of Cinna's life or career before his election as consul.

== First consulship, 87 BC ==
=== Electoral context ===
In 88 BC, there were two major questions in Roman politics. The first was the Italian question. During the Social War, the Roman republic had granted Roman citizenship to basically all the Italian allies. Publius Sulpicius Rufus, a plebeian tribune, sought to curry their favour by enrolling them equally into the thirty-five tribes (voting units); in this, he was opposed by politicians who wished to pack the numerous Italians into a limited number of existing – or eight newly-created – tribes. The other question was one of command. Mithridates VI Eupator, king of Pontus, had recently invaded the province of Asia. The commander of the Roman response would have a great opportunity to become wealthy and influential from the plunder and glory of the war.

Sulpicius attempted to link the two matters by securing transfer of then-consul Lucius Cornelius Sulla's command against Mithridates to the aged general Gaius Marius in exchange for Marius' support for Italian enrolment. But after he passed the legislation transferring Sulla's command to Marius, Sulla suborned his army into marching on Rome to overturn Sulpicius' actions. After doing so, he invalidated Sulpicius' laws and banished twelve men, Sulpicius and Marius included. Sulla justified his actions by claiming that as consul he had a duty to free the state from dangerous demagogues. He also may have passed legislation in 88 BC to change the Roman constitution by reducing the powers and legislative initiative of the plebeian tribunes; however, some scholars have suggested these reforms are retrojections of Sulla's later actions as dictator. Sulla's reasons and putative reforms notwithstanding, his march on Rome was the subject of deep and broad revulsion at the elections.

One of Cinna's goals during his consulship was holding Sulla legally responsible for his march on Rome; he promised that if elected he would have Sulla prosecuted at the expiration of his term. Sulla did not support Cinna and instead put forward Publius Servilius Vatia Isauricus, an ally who had recently celebrated a triumph. The comitia, still indignant over Sulla's march and treatment of Sulpicius and Marius, rejected Sulla's candidate, instead electing Cinna and Gnaeus Octavius. The two consules designati may have, at the time, been friends. Before the results were officially announced, Sulla realised they would be personally unfavourable; seeking not to interfere in the elections directly, he instead tried for a religious solution to protect his actions. Before he declared the winners, he first induced Cinna and Octavius to swear not to overturn Sulla's arrangements publicly. The consuls-designate did so because Sulla as presiding consul had the power to refuse announcement of the winners and thus invalidate the results. While Octavius seemed to take the oath seriously, Cinna did not.

=== War on Octavius ===
==== Expulsion ====
Cinna's first act as consul was to have a plebeian tribune prosecute Sulla, possibly for his killing of Sulpicius, who when killed had been a serving and sacrosanct plebeian tribune. This was meant to stop Sulla from leaving Italy at the head of an army, strip him of his imperium, and deprive him of his Mithridatic command. It was, however, unenforceable: Sulla ignored the tribunician summons and departed with his army for Greece.

According to Appian, Cinna accepted bribes to support the equal enrolment of the new Italian citizens into the thirty-five tribes. Bribed or not, Cinna declared publicly his support for such enrolment, which brought him immediately into conflict with his co-consul Octavius. Both Cinna and Octavius' partisans quickly armed themselves. Attempts by Cinna to promulgate legislation to distribute the new citizens into the tribes were met by tribunician vetoes backed by Octavius, leading to a riot against the tribunes. A senatus consultum ultimum then may have been moved against the rioters; Octavius quickly executed it, taking his hastily armed supporters down the via Sacra and killing the rioters.

Cinna was unharmed and left the city with some of his major supporters, including Quintus Sertorius, Gaius Milonius, Marcus Marius Gratidianus, and six of the ten tribunes of the plebs. After his departure for Italian towns to raise men and money, the Senate illegally and unconstitutionally stripped Cinna of his consulship and declared him a public enemy (hostis); it also unconstitutionally appointed Lucius Cornelius Merula (also the flamen Dialis) in his place. Due to Merula's priestly duties and taboos, Octavius served as de facto sole consul.

==== March on Rome ====
Cinna reached Nola, an Italian town still holding against Roman siege, where he appeared before the army stationed there in consular regalia. He addressed them as a mistreated consul who had been unjustly deprived of a gift of the people by the senate, who thereby made a mockery of popular sovereignty. The army raised him up and declared their support. Cinna then administered an oath of loyalty for the officers and men. Following this, he travelled around Italian towns saying that he needed their support and that he had been attacked for his pro-Italian advocacy. Octavius and Merula acted to fortify the city.

Gaius Marius, one of the Sullan exiles, returned to Italy and pledged his loyalty to Cinna. Cinna acknowledged Marius as proconsul but Marius scrupulously refused the title before drumming up support among the Italians and returning to Cinna's camp with some 6,000 men. The Senate and Octavius had ordered Pompey Strabo – a commander in the northern theatre of the Social war – to return to Rome and defend the city with his army. Encamped outside the city, he was not prepared to commit for either side before treating with both of them. Cinna's forces then arrived and besieged the city. He led the main force opposite the Colline Gate, with two detachments under Sertorius and Marius on the north and south of the city, respectively. Strabo eventually sided with Octavius; the Senate, seeking support, also ordered Quintus Caecilius Metellus Pius, who was in the field against the Samnites, to make an honourable peace immediately and return to defend the city.

When Metellus negotiated with the Samnites, they demanded citizenship for themselves and all those who had fled to them, release of all war prisoners, and non-reciprocal return of all plunder. Metellus and the Senate refused; Cinna and Marius seized the opportunity and offered the concessions, gaining the Samnites as allies. After one of the military tribunes in Rome defected and opened the gates to the Janiculum, Cinna and Marius' forces moved to storm the city; they were stopped by six cohorts from Strabo's army. Strabo, seeking to leverage his military forces into a second consulship, initiated secret negotiations with Cinna but soon died of plague. Extending the siege, Cinna's forces fanned out across the countryside and cut Rome's food supply. The Senate then sent envoys to Cinna to negotiate a truce. Initially put off by Cinna's demand that they address him as consul, the Senate acquiesced on this point after Merula abdicated his consulship.

==== Extra-legal killings ====
The envoys secured a promise from Cinna that he would not willingly kill anyone, but his ally Marius silently stood behind his chair. Cinna then entered the city and promulgated a law recalling Marius and the Sullan exiles. A squadron of his cavalry, led by Gaius Marcius Censorinus, killed the consul Octavius, who had refused to flee. Censorinus then presented the consul's head to Cinna; this was the first time a consul's head was displayed as a prize to another Roman.

Cinna and Marius then moved to purge some of their political opponents; Gaius and Lucius Julius Caesar were killed without trial, along with Publius Licinius Crassus and Marcus Antonius. Merula – the recently abdicated suffect consul – and Marius' old rival, Quintus Lutatius Catulus, were brought up on trial before the people, possibly for usurpation of the consulship and perduellio, respectively; they committed suicide before the verdict.

The killings were not broad across the political class and likely reflected Marius' grudges; nor were the victims then linked to Sulla. There is no evidence that the purge targeted the victim's families. While later sources – including Dio, Velleius, Livy, Diodorus, and Plutarch – claim that Cinna and Marius butchered and ravaged their way through the city for five days, these claims are likely Sullan propaganda filtered through Sulla's memoirs. Cicero, more contemporaneous and speaking to men who lived during the Cinnan regime, indicates that Cinna and Marius targeted only political enemies and did not threaten all of Rome's inhabitants or otherwise sack the city.

== Dominatio and death ==
When he returned to the city he dominated public affairs and took measures against Sulla. Sulla was declared hostis and stripped of his priesthood. His property was confiscated, his house demolished, and his legislation repealed. His wife and children fled the city for the protection of Sulla's army in Greece. At elections in late 87 BC, Cinna had himself and Marius elected as consuls – contrary to some ancient sources, an electoral comitia was likely held, just the two were the only candidates – for 86 BC. Marius, though, died just thirteen days after assuming his seventh consulship, possibly of pneumonia. In Marius' place, Cinna elevated Lucius Valerius Flaccus. During 86 BC, a census was conducted by Lucius Marcius Philippus and Marcus Perperna. Although Cinna supported the registration of the Italians as citizens, the number counted in that year – just 463,000 – indicates most of the newly enfranchised Italians were yet unregistered. Flaccus, Cinna's co-consul, also brought and passed legislation reducing all outstanding debts by three quarters.

At the close of the year, Flaccus departed for Greece, ostensibly to assume command over a leaderless army – Sulla's command had officially been vacated because he was declared an outlaw – but was soon assassinated by one of his legates, Gaius Flavius Fimbria, who then assumed command. Sulla eventually drove Mithridates from Asia and secured a peace, the Treaty of Dardanos, with generous terms for Pontus by 85 BC. He also suborned Fimbria's army in the east, causing Fimbria to commit suicide.

For the year 85 BC, Cinna chose Gnaeus Papirius Carbo as his consular colleague. Sulla's peace with Pontus, widely regarded as generous so to give Sulla a free hand against his enemies in Italy, and other actions in Asia indicated that he would return in arms. Cinna and Carbo responded by immediately beginning military preparations and a propaganda campaign. They stockpiled money and provisions from all of Italy while levying men and giving warnings that Sulla would, if victorious, overturn Italian enfranchisement. The warnings, given Sulla's violent action against Sulpicius in 88 BC, seemed legitimate.

Late in 85 BC, Sulla sent a letter to the Senate in Rome reciting his achievements in the Mithridatic war and complaining against the regime in Rome. He then promised that he would avenge himself upon those enemies in the name of his murdered friends, his exiled family and Rome. Against Cinna's claims, he also asserted he had no intention to overturn Italian enfranchisement. The Senate responded to the letter by dispatching an embassy to Sulla to try to reconcile him with his political opponents. The Senate also instructed Cinna and Carbo stop military preparations; they agreed to do so but ignored the Senate and continued recruiting. Cinna's strategy seems to have been to force their way east into Greece and fight Sulla there.

Cinna and Carbo continued in office as consuls for 84 BC; early in that year, Cinna started to embark his men across the Adriatic to Liburnia, in the northern Adriatic, meaning that Cinna was not intending to challenge Sulla in Greece. When transiting the Adriatic, the first set of ships transited safely. But the second set encountered a storm. Some of the ships sank and many men deserted, saying they were unwilling to fight fellow citizens. The remaining men waiting to depart at Ancona then refused to embark. Appian reports that when Cinna called an assembly, he attempted to impose discipline, which culminated in his men mutinying and killing him. Plutarch delivers a different story centring around soldiers fearing that Cinna had assassinated the then-young Pompey; this story, however, is not credible. After his death, his co-consul Carbo was recalled to Rome hold elections for his replacement, but after two attempts to hold elections received bad omens, the elections were indefinitely postponed and Carbo held office without colleague for the rest of the year.

The Senate's envoys brought news of Cinna's death to Sulla. Sulla then rejected the Senate's offers, refused to disband his army, and demanded that the Senate restore his legal status, property, and offices. Sulla's rejection of terms was met poorly. Eventually, Sulla invaded Italy in 83 BC, triggering a civil war, in which he was eventually victorious, the next year.

== Assessment ==
The dominatio Cinnae is not well documented. According to Robin Seager, in the Cambridge Ancient History, "assessment [of it] is rendered painfully difficult by the way in which our scrappy sources are pervaded by the insidious influence of Sulla's own version of events, diffused without competition after his victory" in the civil war. Cinna and his faction, however, were the first to transform force into political domination. Their methods did not accord with republican principles, setting a precedent later followed by Sulla, Caesar, and Octavian.

The short length and partial nature of his dominatio – Cinna seems only to have wanted to be consul every year – have made it difficult to develop a clear assessment of his politics or character. Previous scholarship and ancient narratives, which painted Cinna as an appendage to Marius, are now largely rejected. He was competent at using popularis-style argumentation but had no diagnoses for the republic's more structural flaws.

His support for Italian enfranchisement and distribution among the thirty-five tribes was opportunistic and he only haltingly followed through on his Italian promises once entrenched in power. After the initial wave of killings with Marius in 86 BC, there are no signs of extra-legal persecutions. The nature of politics during his dominatio was relatively traditional though the consul and the Senate acted largely independently and were also largely willing to ignore the other. While there must have been resentment over Cinna's monopolisation of the consulship, the political class in Rome during his consulships was largely not personally threatened and left alone.

Political offices
Preceded by L. Cornelius Sulla; Q. Pompeius Rufus	Consul of the Roman Republic; 87 BC (deposed); With: Gn. Octavius	Succeeded by L. Cornelius Merula suffectus
Preceded by Gn. Octavius; L. Cornelius Merula	Consul of the Roman Republic late 87 – 84 BC; With: Gaius Marius (86 BC); L. Valerius Flaccus (86 BC, suffect); Gn. Papirius Carbo (85–84 BC)	Succeeded by L. Cornelius Scipio Asiaticus; G. Norbanus
