= Lucius Cornelius Merula (consul 87 BC) =

Roman senator and priest of Jupiter

Lucius Cornelius Merula (died 87 BC) was a politician and priest of the late Roman Republic.

== Biography ==
Lucius Cornelius Merula held the office of flamen Dialis (high priest of Jupiter), and wore the flamen's cap at all times, unlike the other flamines who only wore it while performing sacrifices.

In 87 BC, during the civil war between the consuls Gnaeus Octavius and Lucius Cornelius Cinna, he was appointed consul by the former in place of Cinna, who had been driven from Rome. He negotiated the return of Cinna and Marius from banishment, and abdicated his consulship. However, false charges were made against him during Marius's purges of his political enemies, and he committed suicide, opening his veins in the Temple of Jupiter Capitolinus and imploring the gods to avenge him on Cinna and his allies. He had first taken care to remove his flamen's cap, for it was considered a sin for a flamen to wear it at his death.

The position of Flamen Dialis was now vacant. Marius's fourteen-year-old nephew Julius Caesar was nominated to fill it in 86 BC by Marius and Cinna. Scholars disagree about whether Julius Caesar held the position but this nomination was annulled by Sulla subsequently. The position was not filled again until under Augustus, between 16 and 10 BC, dated by Cassius Dio to 11 BC, but Tacitus to 15 BC.

Political offices
Preceded by Lucius Cornelius Cinna	Roman consul with Gnaeus Octavius; 87 BC (suffect)	Succeeded by Lucius Cornelius Cinna
