= Gaius Flavius Fimbria (quaestor 86 BC) =

Roman soldier and a violent partisan of Marius

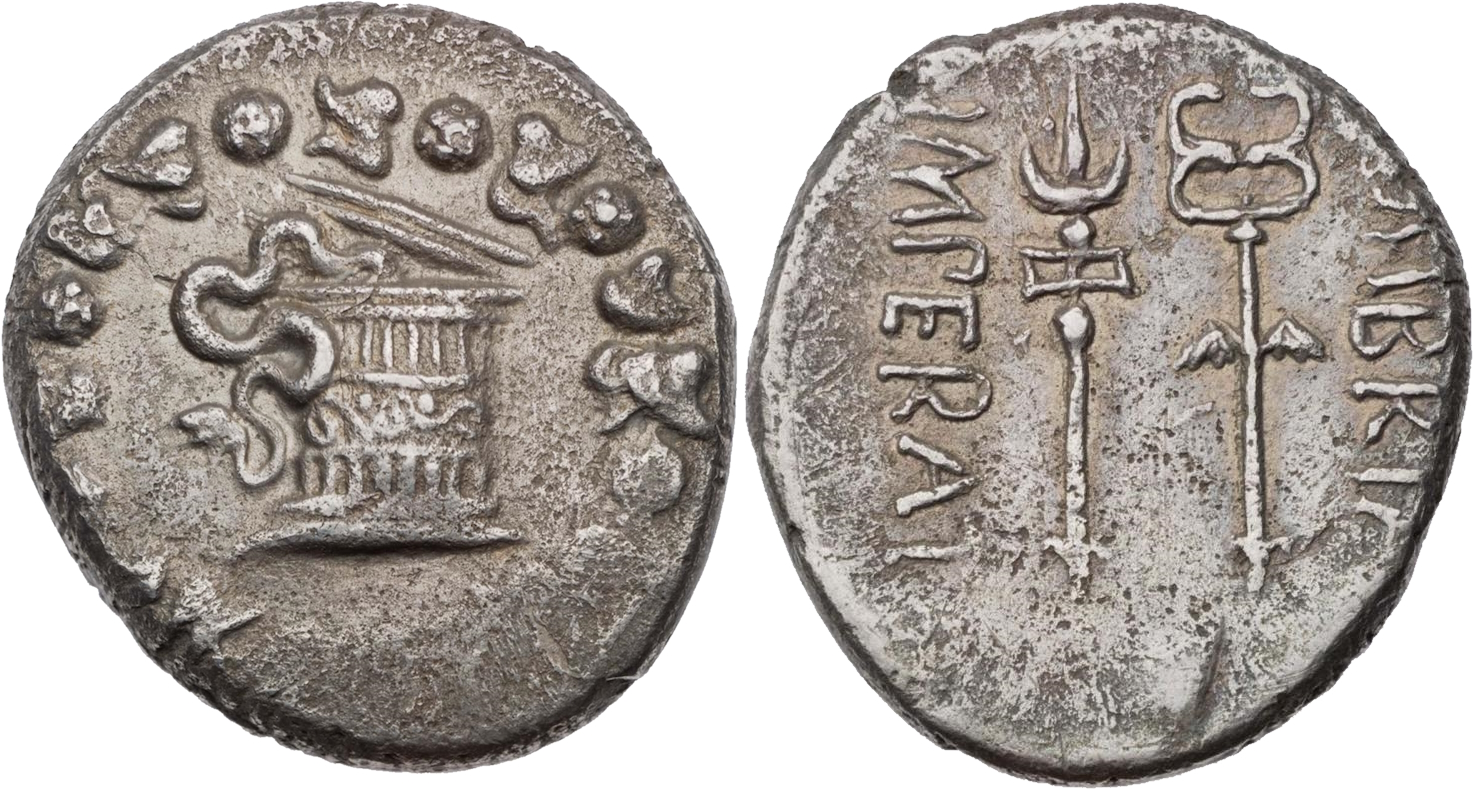
- Cistophorus minted by Fimbria in Pergamum after he took the city in 85 BC

Personal details
- Born: 115 or 114 BC
- Died: 85 BC (aged 29–30) Pergamum, Roman Asia (modern-day Bergama, İzmir, Turkey)
- Cause of death: suicide

Military service
- Allegiance: Roman Republic; Marius and Cinna
- Years of service: 87–85 BC
- Rank: Probably cavalry prefect and pro-quaestor
- Commands: Fimbrian legions
- Battles/wars: Bellum Octavianum; First Mithridatic War

Gaius Flavius Fimbria (c. 115 – 85 BC) was a Roman general. Born to a recently distinguished senatorial family, he became one of the most violent and bloodthirsty partisans of the consul Cornelius Cinna and his ally, Gaius Marius, in the civil war of 87 BC. During the conflict, Fimbria served them as both cavalry commander and negotiator, and took a leading part in the political purges that followed their capture of Rome, putting a number of prominent aristocrats to death.

In 86 BC, Fimbria served as the quaestor of Marius, elected consul for the 7th time, who nevertheless died after only two weeks in charge. The new consul, Lucius Valerius Flaccus, was tasked with conducting the war against the king of Pontus, Mithridates VI, with Fimbria as his quaestor. However, Fimbria murdered Flaccus midway through and assumed command of the campaign. In Asia, after having defeated Mithridates, Fimbria was confronted by Lucius Cornelius Sulla, the first Roman general in charge of the war, who had been removed from his command by Cinna and Marius, but entered into a rebellion against the official government in Rome. After his two legions deserted to Sulla, who had a larger army, Fimbria committed suicide in Pergamum. Fimbria's contemporary Cicero remembered him as "the most audacious madman of his times".

== Life ==
=== Partisan of Marius ===
Gaius Flavius Fimbria was probably born in 115 or 114 BC. His father presumably was the identically named senator from the previous generation, a novus homo who had been the consul together with Gaius Marius in 104 BC. The younger Fimbria likely also had a close relationship with Marius himself, since he later became one of his supporters and carried out the dirty work of eliminating his political opponents. During the civil war in 87 BC between the consuls Lucius Cornelius Cinna and Octavius, Fimbria, like Marius joined the party of the former. He commanded a cavalry squadron, and probably held the rank of cavalry prefect (praefectus equitum).

Cinna sent Fimbria as an envoy to negotiate an alliance with the Samnites, who were still fighting the Social War against the Roman government. Fimbria brought the Samnites into the fold by accepting, as instructed, all their terms for peace, which had already been rejected by the consul Octavius and the Senate. When Octavius was finally forced to capitulate, and allow his rivals into Rome, Fimbria participated in the subsequent purge of Marius' and Cinna's enemies in the city. He commanded the cavalry troop that hunted down and killed the father and brother of the future triumvir Crassus. (Note: A confusing text of Granius Licinianus mentions a battle between the elder Crassus and Fimbria.) Fimbria probably also caused the brothers Lucius and Gaius Caesar to be murdered in their homes.

The following year, 86 BC, Cinna and Marius, now in undisputed control of the government, were declared consuls, the latter for his seventh time. Fimbria became a prominent figure in the Marian–Cinnan regime, and is described as one of their fiercest and loyalest partisans. He was probably appointed quaestor to the elderly Marius, who died two weeks into his term as consul. At his funeral, Fimbria threatened the pontifex maximus, Mucius Scaevola, apparently arranging for him to be murdered. Upon hearing that his victim survived, albeit with a severe wound, Fimbria launched against him a prosecution before the people (judicium populi). When asked what charges could he possibly bring against such a well-reputed man, Fimbria declared that the victim had failed to submit his body to the full thrust of the blade.

Cinna's government in 86 BC organized a military expedition to the province of Asia to manage Rome's ongoing war against the king of Pontus, Mithridates, and to serve as a political and military countermeasure to the now outlawed general Sulla, the regime's main opponent, who was at this moment also fighting Mithridates. The expedition was to be led by Marius's replacement consul, Lucius Valerius Flaccus, and Fimbria, owing presumably to his position as quaestor, (Note: According to Livy, Fimbria was a legate, while Appian made him a senator who accompanied Flaccus on his own accord. Velleius called him a cavalry prefect and Strabo a quaestor. Lintott argued for a quaestorship, owing principally to Fimbria's prosecution of Scaevola, which would have required Fimbria to hold a public office. His arguments for Fimbria being quaestor have been accepted by a number of scholars.) joined him as the foremost member of his staff. They were assigned two legions, usually known as the "Valerians" or "Fimbrians". Flaccus took his legions through Epirus, Macedon and Thrace to the Hellespont where he intended to cross over into Asia Minor.

=== March and mutiny ===
The expedition began badly, for after sailing from Brundisium several ships were lost to a storm at sea, and, after landing in Greece, an advance party was bloodied by Mithridatic forces nearby. Moreover, Flaccus, a strict disciplinarian, was unpopular with the troops, many of whom deserted the army to join Sulla. Fimbria, however, was popular with the army, which helped stem the tide of desertions. He was also, however, extremely insubordinate, and made every attempt to undermine Flaccus's authority and make the soldiers loyal to him instead.

Fimbria, encharged with the cavalry, led the advance guard of the army a few days ahead of the main force, and began to stir up trouble by allowing his troops to plunder the surrounding area as they marched through Macedonia and Thrace. After reports made their way back to the rest of the army, and Flaccus himself, he rebuked Fimbria, and ordered the soldiers to give up the stolen booty. After scoring minor victories against isolated Mithridatic garrisons along the Via Egnatia, alongside the Thracian coast, the army camped outside Byzantium. Here Fimbria seized the opportunity to deliver a speech to the soldiers, denouncing Flaccus, accusing him of withholding their money and booty, and living in luxury within the city, while the soldiers endured storms and the winter cold outside. Some of the men, roused to fury, stormed into the city and lodged themselves in places of their choosing.

Fimbria, around this time, entered into a dispute with another officer over lodgings, and Flaccus showed little sympathy for his recalcitrant subordinate, deciding in favor of the latter party. Flaccus then discharged Fimbria and appointed another officer, Minucius Thermus, to take charge of the army while Flaccus himself crossed the Hellespont to Asia in advance. Once Flaccus had sailed to Chalcedon, Fimbria fomented a full-scale mutiny among the rest of the troops at Byzantium. He seized the fasces from Thermus, took command of the army, crossed the Bosphorus, and marched towards Nicomedia, where Flaccus had subsequently taken refuge. Fimbria had Flaccus murdered and his head hurled into the sea, and his soldiers plundered the city.

=== In Asia ===
Flavius Fimbria now marched against the armies of the king, Mithridates, soundly defeating a large force under the command of the king's identically named son at the river Rhyndacus near Miletopolis. Fimbria managed to lure the Mithridatic cavalry, which had been skirmishing with success against his legions, into a deadly ambush. To deal with the enemy infantry, Fimbria broke camp before daybreak, crossed a stream while the rain concealed the sound of the army's march, and caught the Mithridatic army sleeping. After this decisive victory, many cities in Asia defected from Mithridates to Fimbria. He chased the king himself into Pitane on the coast of Aeolis, and would undoubtedly have captured him had Lucullus, Sulla's admiral, co-operated and blockaded the port.

Fimbria treated most cruelly all the people of Asia who had revolted from Rome or sided with Sulla. Having gained admission to Ilium by declaring that, as a Roman, he was friendly, he massacred the inhabitants and burnt the place to the ground. But in 85 Sulla crossed over from Greece to Asia, made peace with Mithridates, and turned his arms against Fimbria, who, seeing that there was no chance of escape, committed suicide, with the assistance of a slave. The two Fimbrian legions were made to serve in Asia till the end of the Third Mithridatic War, but two of his officers, Lucius Magius and Lucius Fannius, fled to Mithridates and were of long service to him.
