= Siege of Mytilene (81 BC) =

Roman victory on Lesbos

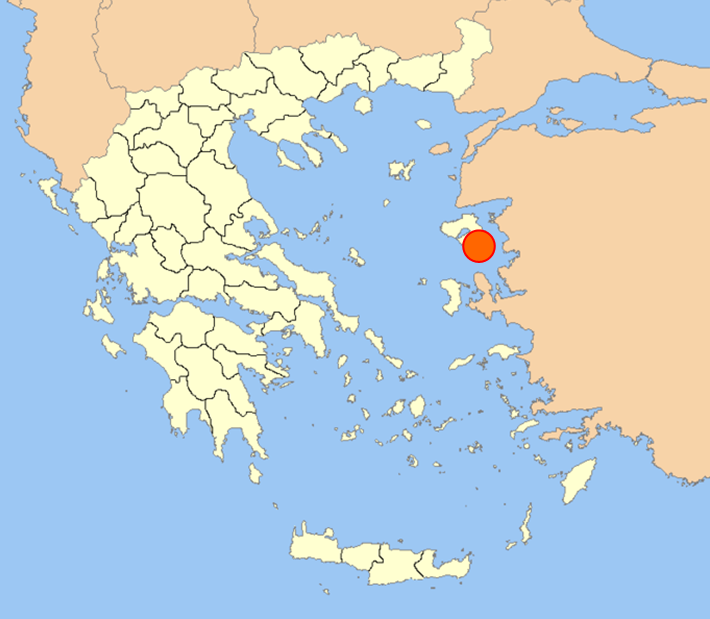
- Location of Mytilene within Greece
Date	81 BC
Location	Mytilene, Lesbos
Result	Roman victory

Belligerents
Roman Republic	Mytilene

Commanders and leaders
Lucius Licinius Lucullus; Julius Caesar; Marcus Minucius Thermus	Unknown

The siege of Mytilene took place in 81 BC during the Second Mithridatic War, when the city of Mytilene on the island of Lesbos was taken by Rome. It was the first documented military action of Julius Caesar.

Mytilene, the capital city of the island of Lesbos in the Aegean Sea, revolted against Rome during the First Mithridatic War and was suspected of actively or tacitly aiding pirates in the region. The island did not surrender at the end of the war, so the reprisal operations were carried during the Second Mithridatic War. Suetonius credits Marcus Minucius Thermus, the governor of the Roman Asia province, with the victory, but the siege may have been conducted by or in coordination with Lucius Licinius Lucullus.

Julius Caesar began his military service during the siege after his pardon by Sulla during the proscriptions of 82 BC. It was during the siege that Caesar was awarded the Civic Crown, a considerable honour in the Roman military, which is a title awarded to a Roman soldier who saves the life of a fellow citizen.
