= Marcus Minucius Thermus =

Roman senator, general, praetor in 81 BC and governor of Asia

Marcus Minucius Thermus was an ancient Roman soldier and statesman. He was praetor in 81 BC and governor of Asia the following year, succeeding Murena. The capture of Mytilene occurred during his governorship; Mytilene had been in revolt against Rome and was suspected of actively or tacitly aiding so-called pirates in the region. Suetonius credits Thermus with the victory, but the siege may have been conducted by or in coordination with Lucius Licinius Lucullus. Little else is known of his life or career.

Julius Caesar began his military service under Thermus after his pardon by Sulla during the proscriptions of 82 BC. It was Thermus who sent the young Caesar as an envoy to the court of Nicomedes IV of Bithynia to request aid in the form of a fleet.

Although Thermus was a Sullan partisan, in 86 BC his younger brother Quintus had been a legate in Asia under appointment by the rival Marians. Quintus had replaced Fimbria after his mutiny.

== Sources ==
- Further discussion by T. Corey Brennan, The Praetorship in the Roman Republic (Oxford University Press, 2000), vol. 2, p. 557 online.
