= Senatus consultum ultimum =

Ancient Roman state of emergency law

Senatus consultum ultimum ("final decree of the Senate", often abbreviated to SCU) is the modern term given to resolutions of the Roman Senate lending its moral support for magistrates to use the full extent of their powers and ignore the laws to safeguard the state.

The decree has been interpreted to mean something akin to martial law, a suspension of the constitution, or a state of emergency. However, it is generally accepted that the senate did not have power to make or provide exceptions to laws. No laws were actually suspended; the senate merely lent its moral authority to defend a magistrate's extra-legal acts.

First used against Gaius Gracchus in 121 BC to suppress a violent protest against repeal of a colonisation law and accepted thereafter, recourse to the decree accelerated over the course of the last century of the republic. Its use was politically disputed, although usually in terms of whether a decree was justified by the challenges facing the state rather than in terms of its overarching legality.

== Name ==
The decree does not have a specific name in the sources, where it is usually mentioned "by quoting what was obviously its opening advisory statements to the magistrate who had it passed". Rather, it is a modern term that emerges from Julius Caesar's Commentarii de Bello Civili, in which he writes:

Recourse is had to that extreme and final decree of the senate...

Caesar coined the term from his tendentious claim that it was passed as a last resort when, in Caesar's words, "the city of Rome itself was already practically in flames and there was despair over the safety of everyone in the state". Since this is the shortest mention of the decree available, "the label... seems to have stuck". The specific phraseology of the senatorial resolution was longer and likely varied. According to Caesar it took the form:

dent operam consules, praetores, tribuni plebis quique pro consulibus sint ad urbem, ne quid res publica detrimenti capiat

That the consuls, praetors, tribunes of the people, and proconsuls in the city, should take care that the state received no injury.

Earlier versions of the decree may have, however, mentioned only the consul presiding. Regardless, the tag that was most often used or referenced in the sources took a form, with variations for the magistrate or magistrates charged with carrying it out, such as:

consul videret ne quid res publica detrimenti caperet or consul rem publicam defenderet

"The consul ought to see to it that the state not take any harm" or "the consul should defend the state".

A minority of modern scholars prefer the name senatus consultum de re publica defendenda rather than Caesar's coinage.

== Decree ==
The decree was a statement of the senate advising the magistrates (usually the consuls and praetors) to defend the state.

The senatus consultum ultimum was related to a series of other emergency decrees that the republic could resort to in a crisis, such as decrees to levy soldiers, shut down public business, or declare people to be public enemies.

=== Effect ===
The decree was seen as permitting the magistrates to use force against public enemies, not necessarily specified in the text of the law, without regard to the law. The decree's impact was mainly in terms of the senate establishing political cover for magistrates to take legally dubious actions. Per Lundgreen in the Encyclopaedia of Ancient History:

Contrary to the (modern) wording and the sometimes assumed notions of certain emergency powers, the s.c.u. should thus not be assessed from a legal perspective but from the point of political rhetoric.

This political cover took the form of a senatorial promise to use its dignitas and auctoritas to support magistrates executing the decree if they were later prosecuted. The decree and the ensuing use of force was largely the only way in which the late republican government could stop political violence or enforce public order without a police force. Its enforcement was also dependent on the enforcing magistrate already being able to mobilise a substantial number of followers to repress an opponent; this, along with the prerequisite senatorial agreement, meant that execution of the decree was dependent on some degree of at least temporary popular consensus for repressive action.

Normally, citizens were protected against the power of magistrates by the right of provocatio and the protection of the tribune of the plebs. One of the effects of the senatus consultum ultimum may have been in directing or convincing the tribunes not to intervene; there are also cases where tribunes actively supported it. The final decree may also have been the senate's instruction that the consuls ignore the laws and use their imperium (the power of military command) within the pomerium (the boundaries of the city), "overpower[ing] the normal potestas [civil magisterial authority] of all other magistrates, including that of the tribunes". Because the decree was vague, its specific effects were at the discretion of the magistrates charged with putting it into effect.

=== Liability ===
The senate itself had no authority to authorise the breaking of laws; it did not do so when moving a senatus consultum ultimum. Its vague decree, rather, urged the magistrates, with substantial discretion, to resolve a crisis; in doing so, it pinned all legal liability for those actions on the magistrates themselves. Passing the decree instead signified that the senate offered its support of the measures taken and that extra-legal measures were needed for the safety of the state.

In the aftermath of the decree's usage, those responsible for the use of force were regularly prosecuted on grounds that citizens had been killed extrajudicially; the defence in the courts then was one of justification. In the first instance, in 121 BC, the consul executing the decree justified his actions in terms of public safety; Cicero in his time may have brought a similar argument in De legibus in his tag Salus populi suprema lex esto ("Let the safety of the people be the supreme law"). By Cicero's time (c. 63 BC), the decree had been legitimised merely by custom and precedent.

There are multiple cases where magistrates or their followers taking actions armed with a senatus consultum ultimum were faced with the prospect of being hauled before the courts in later years: Lucius Opimius, Gaius Rabirius, and Cicero being prime examples. The senate, at times, would attempt to use its influence to secure an acquittal of a magistrate charged, or otherwise threaten to declare anyone who brought charges hostis. Opponents, rather than disputing the validity of the senatus consultum ultimum in general, rather disputed the need or justification of a specific instance thereof.

== History ==
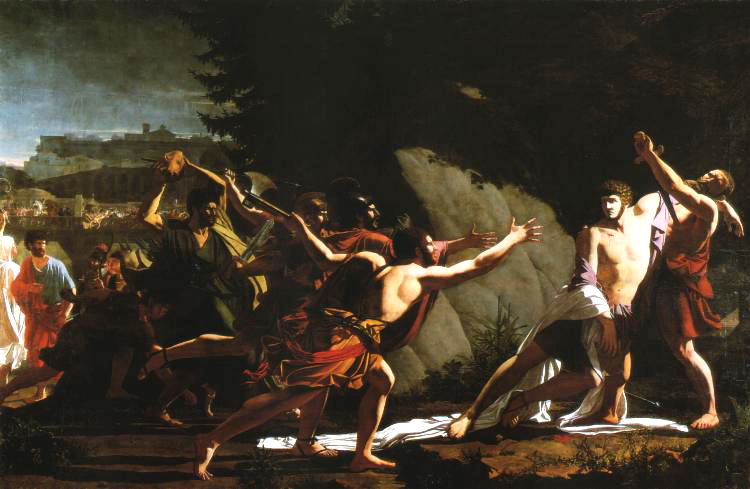
A 1792 depiction of the death of Gaius Gracchus, who was driven to suicide after the passage against him of the first senatus consultum ultimum in 121 BC.

Senatus consultum ultimum timeline. All years from Momigliano & Lintott 2012 unless otherwise indicated. Sulla (83): Golden 2013, p. 121. Months for 43 BC from Golden 2013, pp. 197, 204.

Livy asserts that the senatus consultum ultimum was first used in 446 and 384 BC, but scholars do not read these as actual usages of something akin to the senatus consultum ultimum of the late republic. Modern scholars believe it is likely that these claims are anachronisms inserted into the early republic.

=== Development ===
In cases of sedition in Rome, the republic faced a three-fold problem. First, there was no standing army or police force with which to maintain public order. Second, well-protected rights of provocatio and tribunician intercession constrained magisterial powers of punishment. Third, the operations of the criminal courts were insufficiently rapid and could regardless be disrupted by armed mobs. The senatus consultum ultimum may have emerged naturally as a response to these problems as a means of self-help. Theodor Mommsen, for example, argued that the temporary suspension of legal process was excusable due to its necessity. Gerhard Plaumann agreed and argued that the decrees made such legal lapses less arbitrary.

Its usage in the late republic also was in contrast to the general practice of the early republic to appoint dictators to resolve domestic unrest. By the time of the emergence of the senatus consultum ultimum in 121 BC, the dictatorship had been in abeyance for some time, the last having been appointed in 202 BC. The development of the final decree was likely motivated by the dictatorship's abeyance. That the consuls also were more likely to be in the city due to magisterial prorogation also made empowering the consuls to act more feasible.

Some scholars trace the senatus consultum ultimum to 133 BC with the killing of Tiberius Gracchus, arguing that the instance meets the criteria of being a senatorial action calling upon the consuls to protect the republic. However, as the consul at the time rejected the senatorial vote and Gracchus was killed by a private citizen (the then-pontifex maximus Scipio Nasica Serapio), historians disagree as to whether this qualifies as an actual senatorial decree.

The first official use of the decree was in 121 BC, when the senate passed it against Gaius Sempronius Gracchus (Tiberius' younger brother) and Marcus Fulvius Flaccus. It was issued in response to a violent protest held by Gracchus and Flaccus against repeal of legislation to establish a colony at Carthage that they and allies had passed the previous year. In the aftermath, Gracchus, Flaccus, and their supporters were killed en masse as one of the consuls of that year, Lucius Opimius, brought soldiers across the pomerium and laid siege to Gracchus and Flaccus' positions on the Aventine Hill.

The following year, Opimius was prosecuted by a tribune for killing citizens without trial, but was acquitted after he justified his actions on the basis of the senatus consultum ultimum. While this set a precedent that actions taken under an senatus consultum ultimum were normally free from legal consequence and could be used to justify substantial repression, the decree remained controversial and continued to be debated by contemporaries.

=== Usage from 100 to 49 BC ===
==== Saturninus and Glaucia ====
It was next used against Lucius Appuleius Saturninus and Gaius Servilius Glaucia in 100 BC. Gaius Marius was then one of the consuls. The proximate cause of the senatus consultum ultimum was Saturninus and Glaucia's assassination of a fellow candidate for the consulship at that year's elections and their general usage of political violence to advance factional political interests. Marius raised a militia which besieged Saturninus and Glaucia after they seized the Capitoline Hill. They surrendered after receiving guarantees against summary execution from Marius and were imprisoned in the senate house, but were then lynched by a mob.

Marius' suppression of Saturninus and Glaucia in 100 BC was not quickly forgotten. One of his lieutenants, Gaius Rabirius, was tried twice – both times in 63 BC, decades after the suppression of Saturninus' revolt, – and almost convicted before the trials were disrupted.

==== Sulla ====
A brief and muddled account suggests that a senatus consultum ultimum was moved by the senate, which at the time was under the domination of Lucius Cornelius Cinna's faction, against Sulla shortly before Sulla's civil war in the year 83 BC.

==== Lepidus ====
The next usage well-established was against the uprising of Marcus Aemilius Lepidus in 77 BC. This marked its normal application not against civil disturbance from within the city but also against external enemies without a direct threat to Rome itself. Lepidus, who was governor of Transalpine Gaul, marched on Rome with an army after his reform programme was blocked by his co-consul Quintus Lutatius Catulus Capitolinus. (Note: Views on Lepidus' revolt are mixed. The traditional story is that Lepidus treasonously assumed leadership of some Etrurian rebels and used them to demand a second consulship. It may have been that he instead sought a second consulship to settle the Etrurians' grievances (related to dispossessed lands and citizenship) which had emerged in the Sullan years and was then branded by personal enemies as a insurrectionist.) After the senate was convinced at the urging of a senior senator, Lucius Marcius Philippus, that Lepidus' forces were a threat against the stability of the recently established Sullan constitution, they moved the senatus consultum ultimum and in early 77, Catulus defeated him in battle outside Rome, (Note: Accounts differ as to who defeated Lepidus. Plutarch credits Pompey; Florus says both Catulus and Pompey defeated him; Appian and Livy both credit Catulus alone.) forcing him to flee to Sardinia, where he was later killed in further fighting.

==== Catiline and conspirators ====
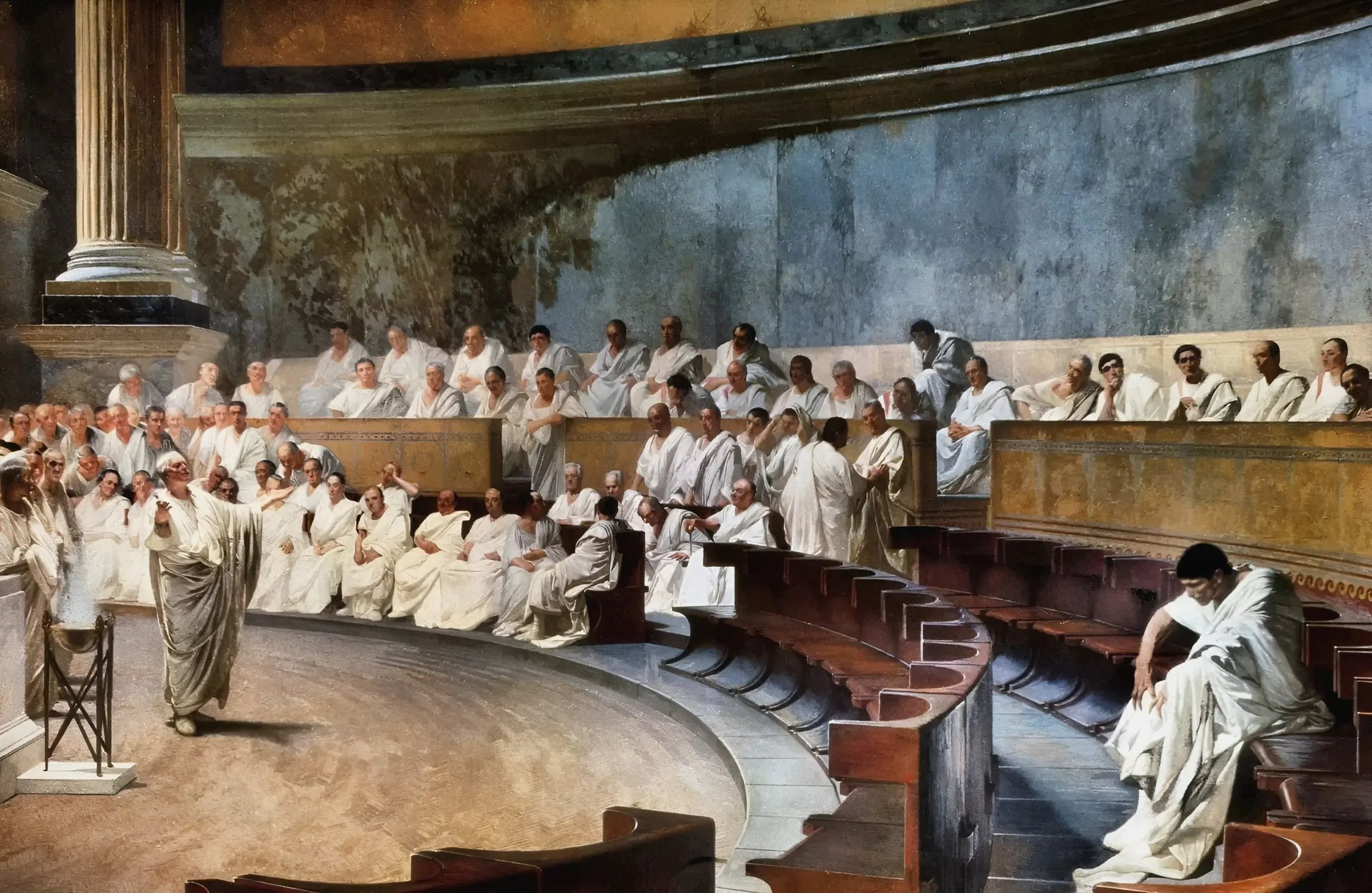
An 1889 depiction of Cicero denouncing Catiline in the senate. In the First Catilinarian, Cicero references a senatus consultum ultimum – "we have a resolution of the senate, a formidable and authoritative decree against you" (Note: In Latin, habemus senatus consultum in te... vehemens et grave. Cic. Cat. 1.1.3.) – empowering him to take action against Catiline's conspiracy.

Following Lepidus' revolt, the final decree was moved again in 63 BC against Lucius Sergius Catilina. Catiline formed a conspiracy to overthrow the government and install himself as consul after being twice defeated in consular elections and having run out of money to finance a further campaign. He then raised an army to pursue his goals by force and proclaimed himself consul after the conspiracy was discovered.

Controversially, Cicero, with the backing of the senate, executed a number of the conspirators who were captured in Rome without trial, partly because of his lack of confidence in the courts on which the Sullan republic was based. This was especially questionable because the men Cicero had killed were not actively under arms or amid armed men; both law and custom in such cases would have directed the state first to convict them before having them killed.

Cicero was immediately attacked by two of the plebeian tribunes for his death sentences. While he was reprieved for a few years by the senate's voting of immunity and its threat to declare anyone who initiated a prosecution against him a public enemy, he nevertheless was forced into a temporary exile in 58 BC when Publius Clodius Pulcher passed a new law – overriding the senatorial grant of immunity – sentencing anyone who had put to death citizens without trial to exile.

The senatus consultum ultimum was raised again in the following year against Quintus Caecilius Metellus Nepos, who was then tribune of plebs, and Julius Caesar to suppress their attempts to violently force through a proposal to give the command against the Catilinarians to Pompey. Caesar and Metellus Nepos backed down and their careers continued (they reached the consulship in 59 and 57 BC, respectively).

==== Milo and Clodius ====
The next instance was in 52 BC, which occurred in a climate of profound political instability. For the last two years, it had been almost impossible to hold regular elections. In 53, the year started without consuls, for there had been no elections, and it proved impossible for seven months to hold elections due to constant street skirmishes between mobs loyal to Publius Clodius Pulcher and Titus Annius Milo and tribunician vetos against election of interreges to call elections. The elections for 52 were similarly delayed; in January 52, there were no magistrates in the city, and a chance encounter between Pulcher and Milo led to Pulcher's death by Milo's hand, leading to the burning of the senate house by a mob.

The senate moved the senatus consultum ultimum and instructed an interrex, with the support of Pompey and his troops, to restore order and suppress the Clodian and Milonian mobs. Pompey was then elected sole consul to maintain order. Order was restored relatively quickly and there were no large-scale extrajudicial killings; Milo was then duly prosecuted for murder under the lex Pompeia de vi in 52 BC.

==== Caesar ====
One of the most famous usages of the senatus consultum ultimum was against Julius Caesar in 49 BC, after negotiations between him and senate broke down the first week of January that year. While the senatus consultum was vetoed by tribunes friendly to Caesar, this was ignored, as the senate was convinced that conflict was inevitable. This, along with Caesar's crossing of the Rubicon days later, triggered his civil war.

Caesar, for his part, objected to the use of the senatus consultum ultimum: while accepting its legitimacy in general, he objected more specifically to the use of the decree – which he characterises as a last resort – in the absence of violence in the city and its use to put Caesar-aligned tribunes to flight, enabling the senate to act against him without the tribunes' interventions. Caesar's claims were not entirely accurate: there was precedent for passing a senatus consultum ultimum against a target far from Rome; moreover, Caesar's claim that the tribunes were put to flight is debated, for Cicero reports the Caesar-aligned tribunes left without the pressure of violence.

=== Later usage ===
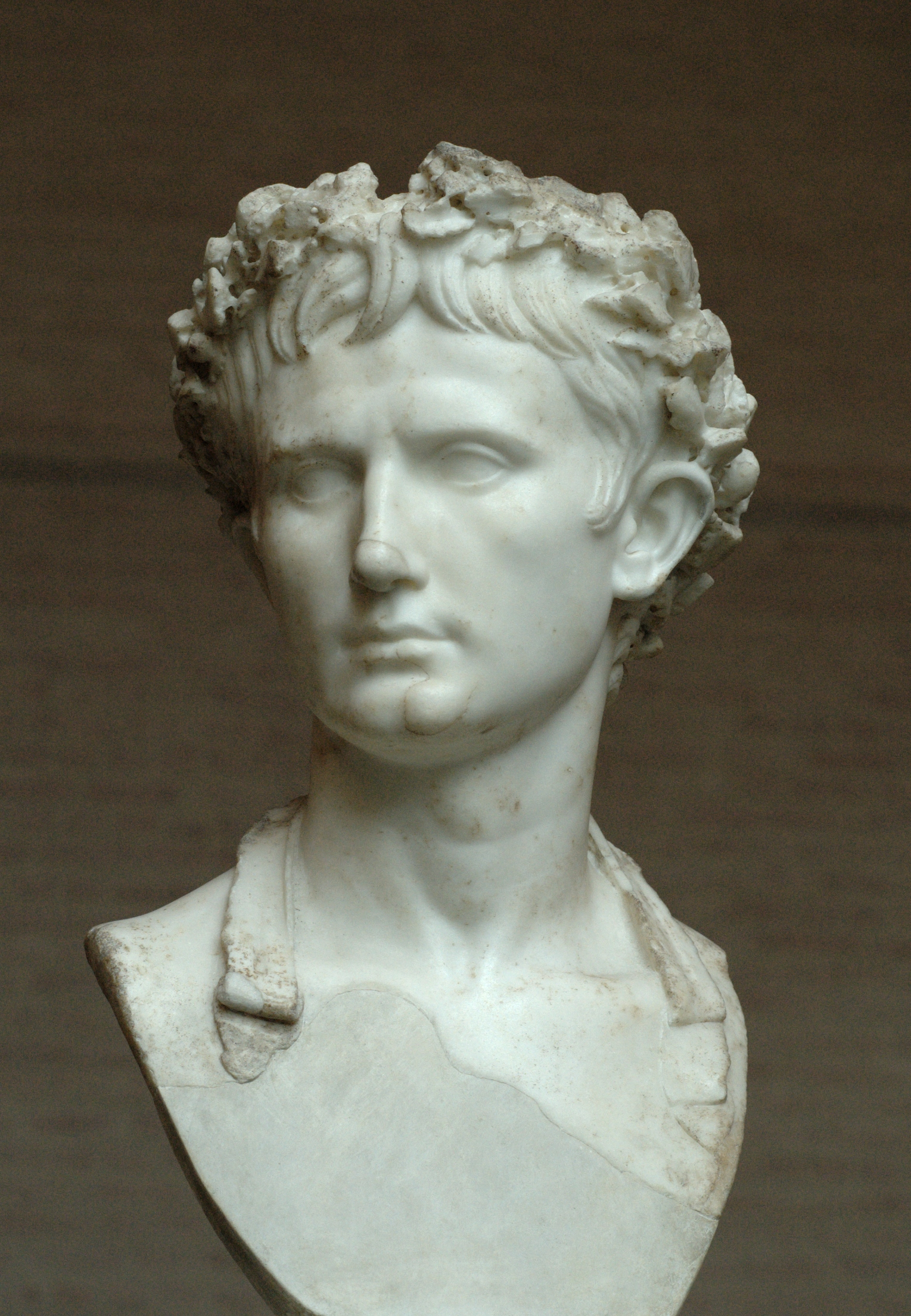
A senatus consultum ultimum was decreed against Octavian, pictured in a later bust, which became unenforceable when the senate's forces defected to Octavian's side.

The senatus consultum ultimum remained in use during the civil war. It was used to suppress a revolt for debt relief instigated by Marcus Caelius Rufus and Titus Annius Milo in 48, resulting in both their deaths. It was used again against civil disturbance instigated by Publius Cornelius Dolabella in 47 BC when he seized the Forum in an attempt to force through a law abolishing all debts. Mark Antony, then Caesar's dictatorial lieutenant, led troops to disperse Dolabella's encampment, which resulted in the slaughter of, reportedly, eight hundred citizens. Dolabella, however, survived and was later pardoned by Caesar.

Following Caesar's civil war, the senatus consultum ultimum remained in use for a short time until its last recorded use in 40 BC. (Note: The last use, in 40 BC, was against Quintus Salvius Salvidienus Rufus, whom Octavian induced the senate to condemn, resulting in Salvius' death.) During the short war between the senate and Antony, Antony was possibly targeted by a senatus consultum ultimum in 43 BC which the consuls, Aulus Hirtius and Gaius Vibius Pansa Caetronianus, enforced by marching north and engaging Antony in battle. The consuls marched north with the aid of Octavian, who had been voted imperium pro praetore and directed to join the consuls.

Although victorious, both consuls were killed in the fighting and Octavian demanded the consulship, which the senate refused; in response, he marched on Rome with his army (adduced by defections from the now-leaderless consular armies). Octavian was then targeted by another senatus consultum ultimum which directed the urban praetor – Marcus Caecilius Cornutus – to defend the city, but the remaining forces under the senate quickly defected to Octavian, leading to his irregular election as consul with Quintus Pedius. Whatever the military resources made available to the senate by a senatus consultum ultimum, they were not sufficient to defeat those of the dynasts.

== Impact ==
The senatus consultum ultimum and political violence were both a symptom and a cause of the weakened elite cohesion that contributed to the fall of the republic. Its use from 121 BC onward signalled a loss of elite cohesion, which would have, with its strong cohesion and norms of collective government, precluded such crises in the first place. Perspectives differ as to the extent to which this displayed senatorial weakness: while use of the senate's auctoritas in this manner itself implied its insufficiency to restrain seditious behaviour, targets (like Caesar) argued not against the decree's inherent invailidity, but rather its application to their circumstances, showing his at least ostensible need to respect the traditional political culture which placed the senate at the republic's heart.

Moreover, as Harriet Flower argues, "the decree itself, in tone and in effect, seems to subvert the effectiveness of the existing norms of the very republican government that it purported to uphold", adding that its use against Gaius Gracchus and Flaccus in 121 BC set a dangerous precedent that "suggested violence as the logical and more effective alternative to political engagement, negotiation, and compromise within the parameters set by existing political norms".

Some scholars who believe in the factionalist interpretation of Roman politics between populares and optimates also frame the decree in terms of the ostensible struggle between the two factions and in terms of an attempt to disguise core sociopolitical disputes as legal arcana. Attempts by older scholarship to paint the so-called populares as opponents of the decree's use, or of the death penalty, are widely rejected as being inconsistent with the evidence of acceptance and use of the decree across the political spectrum. By the post-Sullan period, the use of the decree was both normalised and accepted: Caesar accepted its legality (although he denied its suitability in his situation), as did the late republican historian Sallust.

== See also ==
- State of emergency
- Roman emergency decrees
