= Roman emergency decrees =

Ancient Roman political phenomenon

The ancient Roman state encountered various kinds of external and internal emergencies. As such, they developed various responses to those issues.

When faced with an emergency, the early Roman Republic appointed dictators who would take charge of the emergency with relatively loose bounds of action and resolve that crisis before resigning. Through the Republic, various decrees allowed dictators and magistrates to conduct emergency levies of troops and suspend public business. During the late Roman Republic, the senatus consultum ultimum emerged wherein the senate would urge the magistrates to break the laws to ensure the safety of the state, usually with the promise of political and legal cover if the magistrates were later brought to account. A further decree was introduced where the senate stripped targets of their citizenship rights, allowing magistrates to treat them as foreign enemies.

The fall of the Roman Republic and the emergence of autocracy made most of the Republican decrees obsolete. The problems of public order they were meant to resolve were themselves resolved by the introduction of police forces. Various people, usually deposed emperors or provincial rebels, continued to be declared public enemies (hostis), but as the use of force became a normal part of imperial rule, various decrees authorising that use of force became unnecessary.

== During the Republic ==
During the Roman Republic, the state had various measures which could be decreed in the case of an emergency. The main problems facing the Republic in the suppression of insurrections and other emergencies were three-fold. First, the state did not have at its disposal a standing army or police force to maintain public order. Second, the use of force to maintain public order was illegal inasmuch as all citizens had provocatio rights allowing them to appeal to the people against magisterial coercion. Third, the ability to hold rioters accountable through standard judicial process was slow and also could be itself disrupted by political mobs.

=== Senatus consultum ultimum ===
Starting in 121 BC with the repression of Gaius Gracchus and his supporters, the senate could urge magistrates to break the laws and employ force to suppress unspecified public enemies. Such decrees were similar to modern declarations of emergencies.

Magistrates operating under the decree gained political cover to take whatever illegal actions thought necessary to resolve a crisis. Actions taken under such decree were not legal or immunised, but magistrates prosecuted for crimes – usually the crime of killing a citizen without trial – committed in executing such a decree could escape punishment if they were able to justify their actions.

=== Tumultus ===
A tumultus was a state of emergency declared under threat of hostile attack. During the duration of a tumultus, state officials wore military dress, all military leave was cancelled, and citizens were levied into the military. A iustitium also was normally declared, closing the law courts and suspending other civilian public business. The authority to declare a tumultus usually rested with a dictator, if in office, or the senate.

According to Cicero, the early Roman Republic distinguished between two kinds of tumultus: a tumultus Italicus referring to a war in Italy – which in the late Republic meant a civil war – and a tumultus Gallicus referring to an attack by the Gauls. Tumults also were declared against slave uprisings and, in the late Republic, may have been declared by the senate or on consular authority alone after passage of a senatus consultum ultimum. To that end, it was repurposed as a means to raise militias to put down armed insurrections.

In the middle Republic, the tumultus' emergency levy was the only time that citizens without sufficient property to qualify for military service (the capite censi or proletarii) were enrolled into the military; in 281 BC, responding to the invasion of Pyrrhus, the levied proletarii were also first armed at state expense. In the later Republic, the declaration remained a means to admit volunteers and quickly raise an army for the duration of the emergency. For the declaration's duration, plebeian tribunes also were sometimes asked to turn a blind eye to the enforcement of laws exempting certain classes of people, such as the elderly, from military service.

=== Justitium ===
During the duration of a justitium, all civilian public business – including the operation of the public treasury – was suspended; this was ostensibly to allow the Roman people to concentrate their efforts on the levy. It was normally proclaimed by a magistrate (Note: Whether Tiberius Gracchus proclaimed a justitium during his term as plebeian tribune to stop all public business was debated by scholars: Mommsen termed it one; modern scholars, however, disagree.) – usually a consul or dictator – at the recommendation of the senate. It could only be rescinded by the magistrate that proclaimed it. Proclamations of a justitium were usually concurrent with those of a tumultus, but could otherwise be declared at the start of a military campaign or war.

=== Hostis declaration ===
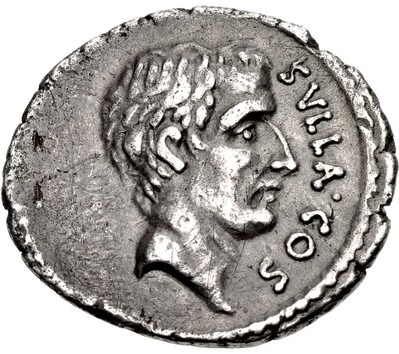
Lucius Cornelius Sulla was declared a public enemy during the Sulla's civil war (83–81 BC).

A hostis (Latin: public enemy) declaration was a statement by the senate, sometimes ratified by a popular assembly, purporting to declare that certain named citizens were enemies of the state and were stripped of their citizenship. Stripping citizenship meant that a citizen could not raise provocatio (the right to appeal to the people against death penalties or physical punishment) and could be killed without trial.

The first men to be declared hostis were Gaius Marius and eleven of his supporters during Sulla's consulship in 88 BC; later, Sulla was voted hostis by the senate under the domination of Lucius Cornelius Cinna. Its passage was controversial: Quintus Mucius Scaevola Augur objected to such a vote in the first instance against Marius, and later, some senators sought not to attend meetings of the senate where such declarations were likely to be proposed.

== During the Roman Empire ==
The need for various declarations declined during the Principate. Because of the formation of the Praetorian Guard and a regular police force with the cohortes urbanae and vigiles, large-scale urban riots became more rare. Moreover, the military autocracy made it unnecessary to have legal justifications for violent crackdowns against rioters and revolts.

A declaration that someone was hostis, however, persisted: when a usurper could not immediately be suppressed or a coup was displacing the current emperor, a few cases emerge where the senate declared the usurper or former emperor enemy of the state. The emergence of autocratic rule also degraded the normal protections available to Roman citizens. (Note: Specifically, provocatio appeals were passed to the emperor, diminishing their impact, and senators and other free men were subject to torture, in violation of the normal prohibition thereof. Other emperors executed alleged conspirators after secret trials or without trial at all.) Hostis declarations also were used against provincial revolts, which had the effect of classifying provincial rebellions in terms of foreign wars rather than internal security measures.

== See also ==
- State of emergency
- Roman citizenship
