= Liv Mariah Yarrow =

American numismatist and professor

Academic background
- Education: University of Oxford
- Thesis: Non-Roman portrayals of foreign affairs in the last century of the Republic : a study of the historical writings of Posidonius, Diodorus Siculus, and Pompeius Trogus (2000)

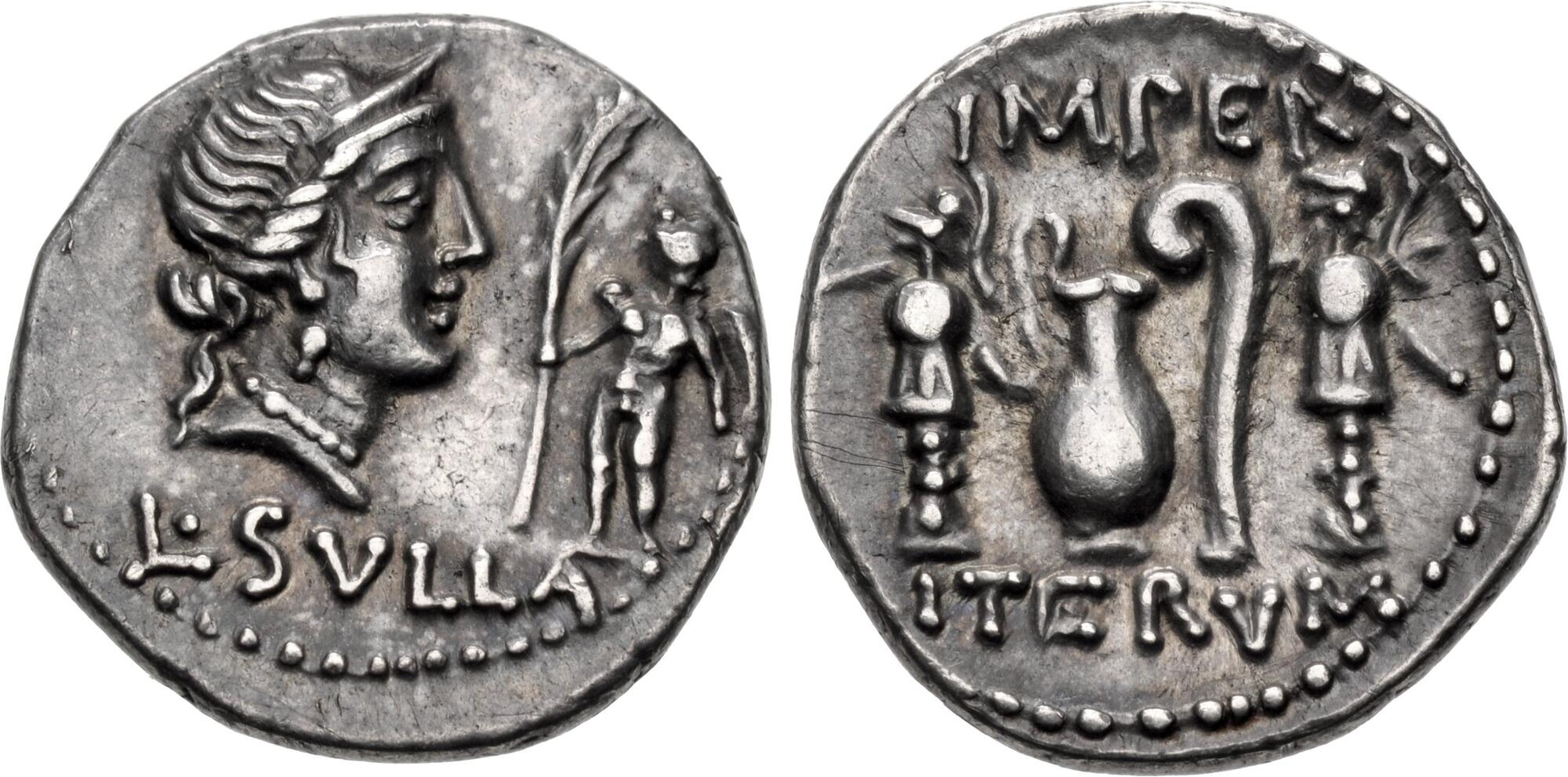
Denarius of Sulla

Liv Mariah Yarrow is a professor in classics at the City University of New York (CUNY) at Brooklyn College. She is known for her work on historiography and numismatics.

== Education ==
Yarrow graduated from George Washington University with a Bachelor of Arts, reading Classical Humanities in 1998. She then went on to read an M.Phil. in Greek and Roman History (2000), and D.Phil. in Roman History (2003) from the University of Oxford.

== Career ==
Yarrow is the co-director of the Roman Republican Die Project with Lucia Carbone at the American Numismatic Society. The project seeks to preserve and expand the work of Richard Schaefer with research into coins.

In 2006, Yarrow was a Kraay Visiting Scholar at the Ashmolean Museum's Heberden Coin Room.

Yarrow has reported said that she "accidentally" found her way into her current field of work, encompassing historiography and numismatics. Her current research involves classical reception, the Roman Republican representation of kings, and the metrology and metallurgy of early Roman bronze coinage. She has also cataloging die though the Roman Republic Die Project.

== Awards and honours ==
Yarrow received the Lhokta Memorial Prize, which is awarded to the author whose work was considered the most helpful to an elementary student of numismatics, in 2022. She was awarded this for her work "The Roman Republic to 49 BCE: Using Coins as Sources".

== Selected publications ==
- Yarrow, L. M. (2006) Historiography at the End of the Republic: Provincial Perspectives on Roman Rule (Oxford: Oxford University Press)
- Yarrow, L. M. (2012) Imperialism, Cultural Politics, and Polybius: Studies in the History and Historiography of the Later Hellenistic Period eds. With C. Smith (Oxford: Oxford University Press)
- Yarrow, L. M. (2018) “The Tree and Sunset Motif: The Long Shadow of Roman Imperialism on Representations of Africa”, Classical Receptions
- Yarrow, L. M. (2018) ‘Romulus’ Apotheosis (RRC 392)’, American Journal of Numismatics 30, p. 145–161, pl. 31–34
- Yarrow, L. M. (2021) The Roman Republic to 49 BCE: Using Coins as Sources (Guides to the Coinage of the Ancient World) (Cambridge: Cambridge University Press)
