= Battle of Protopachium =

Battle fought in 89 BC

- Part of the First Mithridatic War
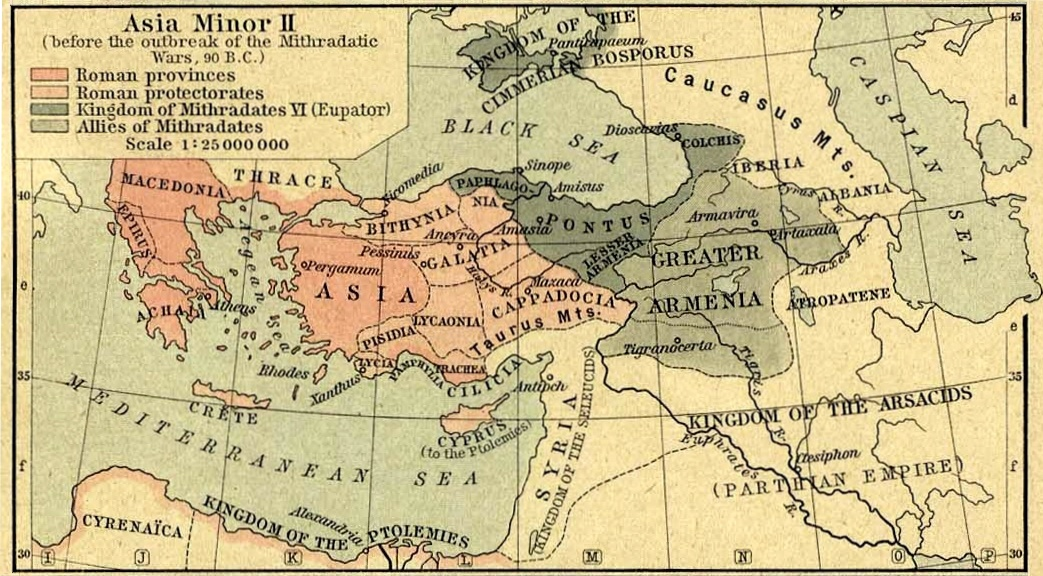
- Asia Minor at the time of the First Mithridatic War
Date	89 BC
Location	Protopachium Fortress in Eastern Bithynia 41°36′N 35°00′E
Result	Pontic victory
Territorial changes	Mithridates expands his empire into Bithynia

Belligerents
Pontic Empire; Kingdom of Armenia	Roman Republic; Kingdom of Bithynia

Commanders and leaders
Mithridates VI; Neoptolemus; Nemanes	Manius Aquillius; Nicomedes

Strength
250,000 infantry; 40,000 cavalry; 130 scythed chariots	40,000 infantry; 4,000 cavalry

Casualties and losses
Low	10,000 infantry; 4,000 cavalry; 300 prisoners
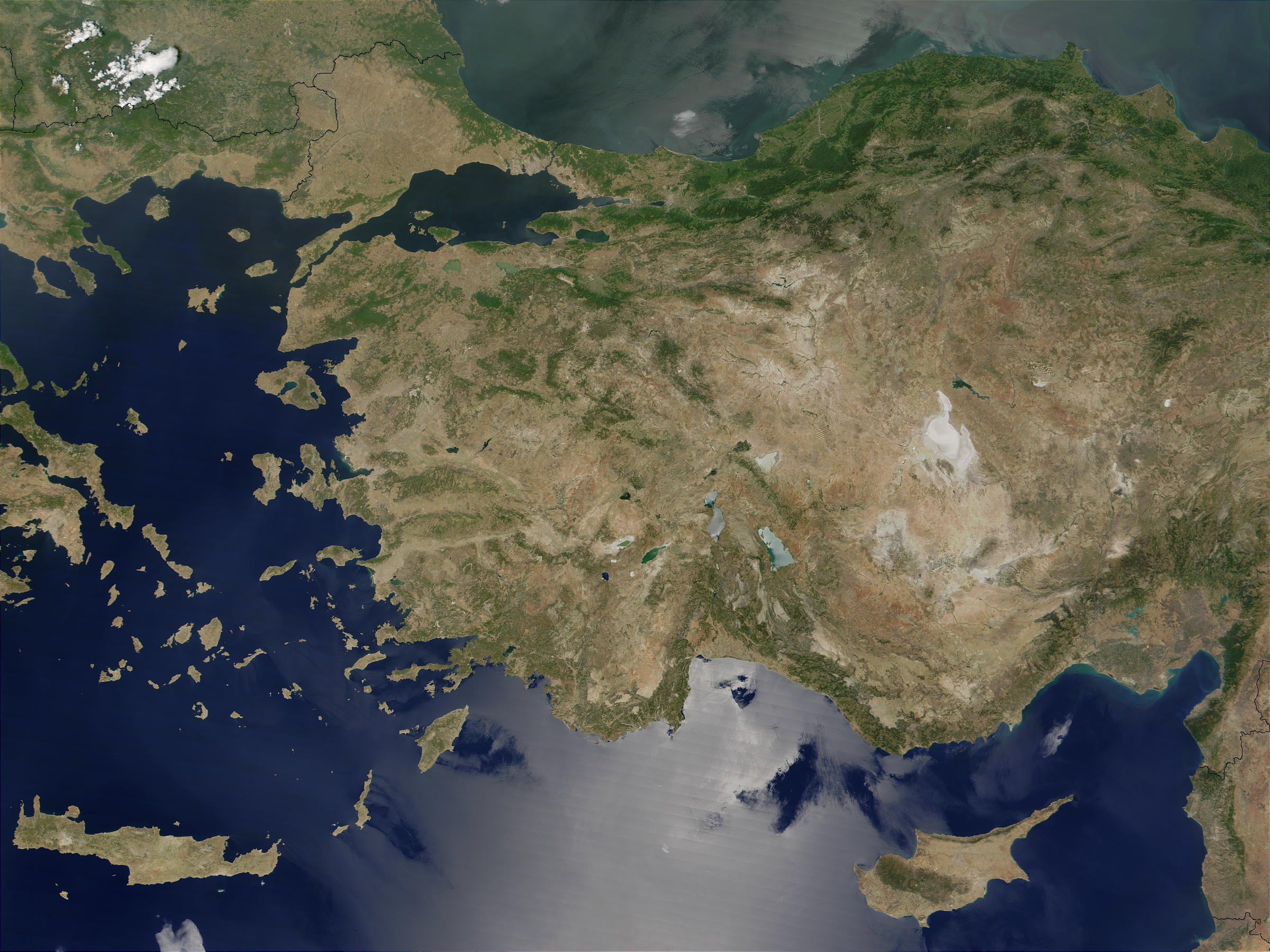
- Location within Turkey Battle of Protopachium (Black Sea) Battle of Protopachium (Asia Minor)

The Battle of Protopachium was fought in 89 BC at the start of the First Mithridatic War, between the Roman Republic and the Pontic Empire. The battle ended in a Roman defeat and their expulsion from Asia Minor.

== Prelude ==
At the start of the war, Nicomedes IV of Bithynia had lost a battle against two of Mithridates' most trusted generals (brothers Neoptolemus and Archelaus) in the Battle of the River Amnias. This battle, along with the Battle of Protopachium, would eventually lead to Rome's retreat from Asia Minor. As a result of the first battle, Manius Aquillius was sent as an ambassador to restore Nicomedes' power. Aquillius found Nicomedes retreating south with Gaius Cassius (the proconsul of Asia) and decided to patrol eastern Bithynia, where Mithridates was likely to go. When Aquillius saw that he was severely outnumbered, he retreated to river Sakarya, which part of Mithridates' army (under the command of Neoptolemus and Nemanes) eventually caught up with them near the fortress of Protopachium in eastern Bithynia. Nemanes had been sent by Tigranes the Great, an ally and son-in-law of Mithridates, to take care of the Roman threat by helping Mithridates.

== Battle ==
The battle was forced, and Mithridates' army easily won. Appian, a Greek historian, states that Aquillius lost about 10,000 infantry, and another source states a loss of 4,000 cavalry. As Aquillius fled, 300 were being taken prisoner and were eventually led to Mithridates, who treated them fairly and some even joined Mithridates' side. Apart from being outnumbered, an additional reason Aquillius lost was that his army was largely consisted troops from Bithynia, exiles from Cappadocia, Paphlagonians, and Galatians. Very few soldiers were Romans.

== Aftermath ==
Aquillius fled to Pergamum (the Roman capital of Asia), while Nicomedes and Cassius fled to the Lion's Head, a powerful stronghold in Phrygia. This enabled them to get Phrygian and other recruits to join their army. Mithridates soon followed, but they both managed to flee to Italy. As Mithridates established control over much of the Roman province of Asia, Aquillius was set to go back to Italy. He had two intact armies, but their morale was extremely low. When Aquillius reached Lesbos, he was handed over to Mithridates by the people of Mytilene, and had molten gold poured down his throat (a similar fate is said to have happened with Marcus Licinius Crassus – 'richest person in Rome').
