= Queen of Bithynia =

Derogatory epithet for Julius Caesar

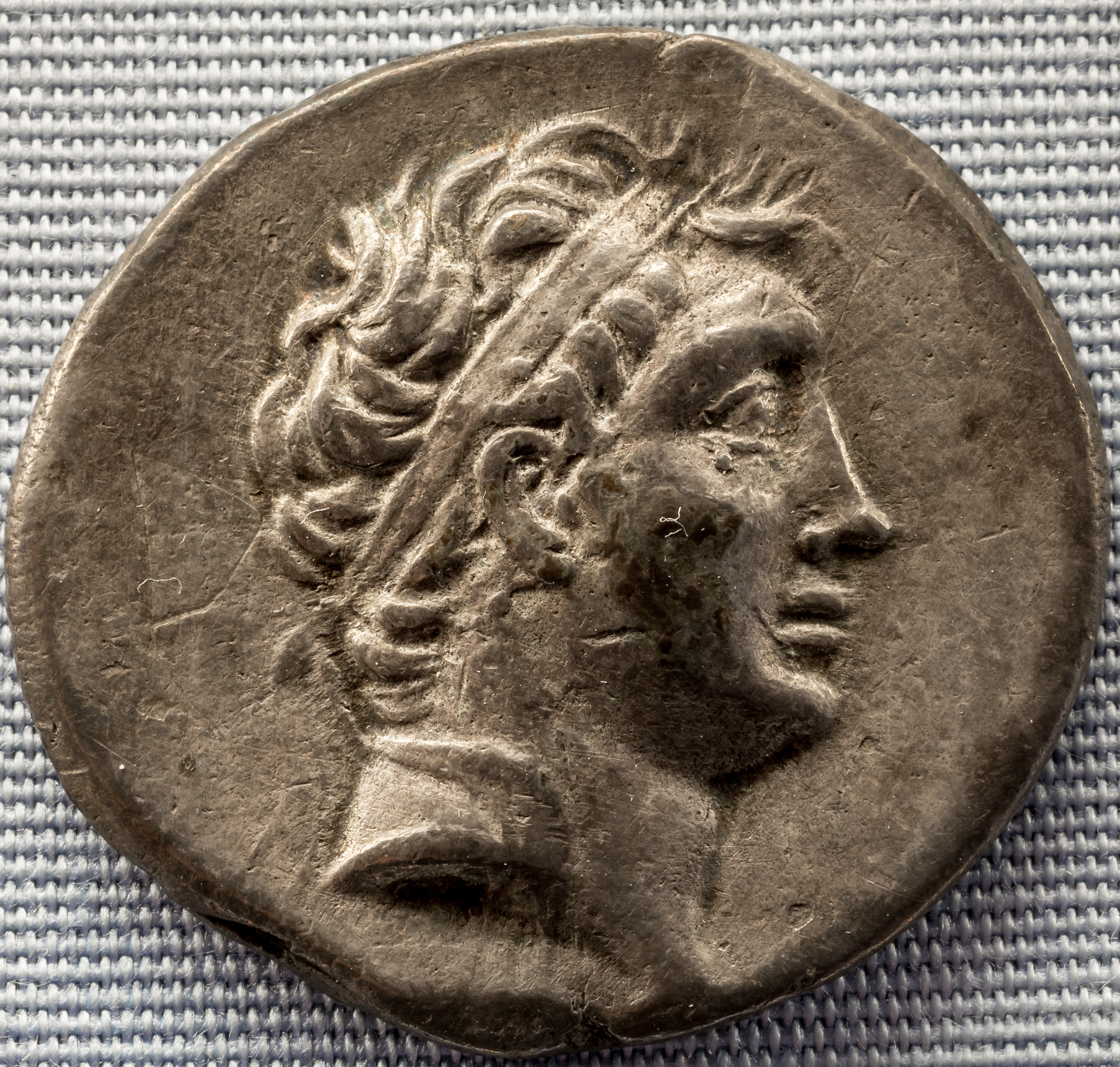
Nicomedes IV of Bithynia on a contemporary coin

The Queen of Bithynia (Latin: Bithynica regina) was a mock ancient epithet of Julius Caesar referencing his alleged homosexual relationship with King Nicomedes IV of Bithynia. The epithet and related rumour were repeatedly invoked by several of Caesar's contemporaries, such as Cicero, Licinius Calvus, Marcus Calpurnius Bibulus and Gaius Memmius. The author, Philip Freeman claims Caesar himself denied such allegation under oath.

== Description ==
Around 80 BC, Caesar, then a young man, joined the staff of Marcus Minucius Thermus in Asia for military training. Thermus had been engaged in bringing Mytilene under Roman control via a siege, and dispatched Caesar to solicit a fleet from allied Bithynian king Nicomedes IV. According to Suetonius, Caesar dawdled at the Bithynian court, so that a rumour emerged of sexual relationship with Nicomedes. Caesar successfully completed his task of summoning an allied fleet. The rumour was spread further when a few days after his task, Caesar returned to Bithynia.

In Roman rhetoric, with modesty (pudicitia) at the forefront, allegations of passive homosexual activity, along with other sexual misconduct, were commonly used against young men, or the youthful period of a man's life. Another example was the trial of Marcus Caelius Rufus, where one of the prosecutors, Sempronius Atratinus, called him a "pretty-boy Jason" (pulchellus Iason).

Marcus Calpurnius Bibulus used the epithet in the edicts he issued during his joint consulship with Caesar. A man named Octavius, at a public assembly, addressed Pompey as "king" and Caesar as "queen" in their presence. At a debate in the Senate, when Caesar recalled some benefits Rome had received from Nicomedes, Cicero interrupted him with "it is well known what he gave you and what you gave him in return". Consul Gaius Scribonius Curio called Caesar "every man's wife and every woman's husband". Caesar's own soldiers upon victorious return from the Gallic Wars sang in parade that "Caesar got on top of the Gauls, Nicomedes got on top of Caesar". (Note: The original Latin: Gallias Caesar subegit, Nicomedes Caesarem: ecce Caesar nunc triumphat qui subegit Gallias, Nicomedes non triumphat qui subegit Caesarem. Suetonius. "Divus Julius 49". The Twelve Caesars.) Modern biographers of Caesar, such as Matthias Gelzer, Christian Meier or Antony Kamm acknowledge the episode, mainly supporting Suetonius' notion that Caesar's stay at the Nicomedes' court directly caused allegations of a sexual relationship. Adrian Goldsworthy characterized it as "a very good piece of gossip, playing on well-established Roman stereotypes".

== See also ==
- Caesar's wife must be above suspicion
- Homosexuality in ancient Rome
- Queen (slang)
