= Balgatia =

Town of ancient Bithynia

Coordinates: 40°09′06″N 31°36′45″E

Balgatia was a town of ancient Bithynia, inhabited during Byzantine times.

Its site is located Juliopolis and Sykeon, in Asiatic Turkey.
