= Lautumiae =

Ancient tufa quarries in Rome

The lautumiae were tufa quarries that became a topographical marker in ancient Rome. They were located on the northeast slope of the Capitoline Hill, forming one side of the Graecostasis, where foreign embassies gathered prior to appearing before the Roman Senate.

The Clivus Lautumiarum was the road (clivus, "slope" or "street") on which they were located. Platner identified the road as the one running between the Curia and the Temple of Concordia which became the Clivus Argentarius in the later Empire, but the Argentarius is also thought to have been a separate street. In Platner's analysis, it was thus one of six streets leading into the Forum, which it connected to the Porta Fontinalis, from there forming the direct link to the Campus Martius until the street plan was altered by the building of the Imperial fora. Vicus Lautumiarum refers to the area as a neighborhood or quarter (see vicus) .

The quarries themselves were used as dungeons, primarily for low-status prisoners such as slaves. They were adjacent to or near the Tullianum or Carcer, forming with it a penal complex that included the Tarpeian Rock and Gemonian stairs. The name Lautumiae was supposed to derive from the latomia (λατομία) of Syracuse, where quarries were used as prisons. Despite Varro's statement that Servius Tullius modeled an underground chamber after the Syracusan latomiae, the word probably came into use sometime between 212 and 180 BC.

The fire of 210 BC burned an area along the northeast side of the Forum Romanum as delineated by the Lautumiae. The Atrium Maenium was located in lautumiis on the Clivus Argentarius.

== Clivus Argentarius ==
Although Platner identified the Clivus Argentarius ("Banker Street") with the Lautumiae, Lawrence Richardson distinguishes the two in A New Topographical Dictionary of Ancient Rome (1992). Richardson identified the Clivus Argentarius as the street that connects the Roman Forum and the Campus Martius, running from the Vulcanal and along the front of the Carcer (Tullianum) over the northeast slope of the Capitoline Hill. Only medieval sources name a Clivus Argentarius, but it probably reflects the ancient financial activity centered on the offices of argentarii, professional deposit bankers.
