= Nysa (wife of Nicomedes IV) =

Nysa or Nyssa (Greek: Νύσ(σ)α flourished 1st century BC) was queen consort of Bithynia. She was married to king Nicomedes IV of Bithynia.

She was a daughter of Ariarathes VI of Cappadocia. She married Nicomedes before he became king, when her father-in-law Nicomedes III was still alive. In 94 BC, her spouse became king.

Granius Licinianus claims that she encouraged a conflict between her spouse and his brother Socrates Chrestus, which resulted in the latter to seek refuge at the court of Mithridates VI Eupator.
