= Dyteutus =

1st-century AD Galatian priest and ruler of Comana in Cappadocia

Dyteutus (died AD 34), eldest son of the Galatian ruler Adiatorix, was a ruler of Comana, a city in Cappadocia. After the father and his eldest son were sentenced to death by Octavianus for the father's partisanship towards Mark Antony, Dyteutus's younger brother asked to die in his brother's place, claiming that he was in fact the elder son. At first Dyteutus resisted, but was persuaded by his father and mother to go along with the deception, on the grounds that his maturity would secure greater protection for his mother and the other surviving members of his family, and the younger brother was put to death. Some contemporary writers reckon the guilt over this false execution was what led Augustus to elevate Dyteutus to rule Comana.

After extremely brief intervening reigns by Medeius and the brigand-king Cleon of Gordiucome, Dyteutus succeeded Lycomedes as priest of the celebrated goddess Bellona, and therefore ruler of Comana. He had a long reign; the temple-state of Comana was annexed to the Roman province of Galatia upon his death in AD 34.
