= Lycomedes of Comana =

Bithynian nobleman of Cappadocian Greek descent

Lycomedes of Comana (Greek: Λυκομήδης; fl. 1st century BC) was a Bithynian nobleman of Cappadocian Greek descent who ruled Comana, Cappadocia in the second half of the 1st century BC.

== Biography ==
In 47 BC, Lycomedes was probably about 50 years old when he was named by Roman dictator, Gaius Julius Caesar, the priest of the goddess Bellona in the temple-state of Comana, and sovereign, therefore, of the surrounding country. The predecessor of Lycomedes was Archelaus, the grandson of the Pontic general Archelaus. Strabo reports that with Roman client King Polemon I of Pontus, Lycomedes besieged a fortress held by Arsaces, a rebel chief who was guarding the sons of King Pharnaces II of Pontus, until Arsaces surrendered.

Later Lycomedes was a supporter of Roman triumvir Mark Antony, who at some point enlarged the territory of Lycomedes' kingdom. Due to Lycomedes’ partisanship with Mark Antony, he was deposed by Octavian after the Battle of Actium. He was succeeded as priest and ruler, briefly, by the brigand-king Cleon of Gordiucome, and more permanently by Dyteutus.

Lycomedes had married a Pontian princess called Orsabaris, the youngest daughter of King Mithridates VI of Pontus, who bore Lycomedes a daughter named Orodaltis.

== See also ==
- Orodaltis
- Orsabaris
