= Orsabaris =

Pontian princess, queen of Prusias ad Mare, and queen consort of Bithynia

Mousa Orsobaris
- Basilissa

Queen consort of Bithynia
- Tenure: c. 90 BC

Queen consort of Comana
- Tenure: c. 47 – c. 37 BC

Roman Client Queen of Prusias
- Reign: c. 47 – c. 37 BC
- Predecessor: Title created
- Successor: Orodaltis
- Born: before c. 90 BC; Kingdom of Pontus
- Died: c. 37 BC; Comana or Prusias
- Spouse: Socrates Chrestus; Lycomedes of Comana
- Issue: Orodaltis
- House: Mithridatic
- Father: Mithridates VI of Pontus

Orsabaris, also spelt as Orsobaris (Greek: η Όρσάβαρις, η Ορσοβάριος, meaning in Persian: brilliant Venus, flourished 1st century BC) was a Princess of the Kingdom of Pontus. She was a Queen of Bithynia by marriage to Socrates Chrestus and later married to Lycomedes of Comana. She was also a Roman client ruler of Prusias ad Mare.

== Life ==
Orsabaris was of Greek Macedonian and Persian ancestry. She was the youngest daughter born to King Mithridates VI of Pontus from an unnamed concubine. Orsabaris was born and raised in the Kingdom of Pontus.

=== Queen of Bithynia ===
Orsabaris was betrothed or had married as her first husband the Bithynian prince, usurper Socrates Chrestus. Socrates Chrestus was a political ally to her father; as well he was her paternal second cousin. This possibility is based on coins minted after 72 BC, found at the Bithynian city of Prusias ad Mare, which bears the inscription of Orsabaris’ name.

These coins reveal Orsabaris’ full name and her royal title in Greek. An example of this coinage is, on one surviving coin, on the obverse side inscribes the full name and royal title of Orsabaris in Greek: ΒΑΣΙΛΙΣΣΗΣ ΜΟΥΣΗΣ ΟΡΣΟΒΑΡΙΟΣ, which means of Queen Mousa Orsobaris, showing her portrait. On the reverse side of the coin, is inscribed in Greek: ΠΡΟΥΣΩΝ ΤΩΝ ΠΡΟΣ ΘΑΛΑΣΣΗ, showing the head of Heracles. The city of Prusias ad Mare was the city that the Pontian paternal ancestors of Orsabaris originated from. Socrates Chrestus had died by the time the Kingdom of Pontus was annexed by the Roman Triumvir and General Pompey in 63 BC.

Orsabaris was captured by Pompey and it seems that she was one of the few remaining relatives from the family of Mithridates VI, whose life was spared by the Romans. Orsabaris became a political prisoner of Pompey and served to adorn his triumph parade in Rome in 61 BC. After Pompey's triumph parade in Rome, Orsabaris was released by the Romans and she returned to Anatolia.

=== Second marriage ===
Orsabaris married a nobleman from Bithynia who was of Cappadocian Greek descent called Lycomedes of Comana, who was the priest of the goddess Bellona and priest-ruler of the temple-state of Comana, Cappadocia. Lycomedes ruled as priest-ruler from 47 BC until after 30 BC. Orsabaris through her marriage, became a ruler of the temple-state and had a daughter with Lycomedes called Orodaltis.

Orsobaris and her daughter Orodaltis were appointed as female rulers of Prusias ad Mare by Mark Antony, and the coins minted by these princesses are dated to the 30s BC. According to O. D. Hoover, Orsobaris ruled Prusias ad Mare from c. 47 BC to c. 37 BC, and her daughter Orodaltis, who succeeded her, ruled from c. 37 BC to c. 31 BC.

The Romans had approved the status of Lycomedes, Orsabaris and their family, as they ruled over Comana for a substantial period. Orsabaris and her family could be viewed as potential successors of Mithridates VI on the Pontian throne, however the Kingdom of Pontus at the time became a Roman Client State who was ruled by Orsabaris' half-paternal brother Pharnaces II of Pontus; the sons of Pharnaces II and eventually by Polemon I of Pontus.

== Sources ==
- Gabelko, Oleg L. (2009). "The Dynastic History of the Hellenistic Monarchies of Asia Minor According to the Chronography of George Synkellos". In Hojte, Jakob Munk (ed.). Mithridates VI and the Pontic Kingdom. Aarhus University Press. ISBN 978-87-7934-655-0.
- A. Mayor, The Poison King: the life and legend of Mithradates, Rome's deadliest enemy, Princeton University Press, 2009
