= Christian Meier (historian) =

German historian (born 1929)

Christian Meier MAE
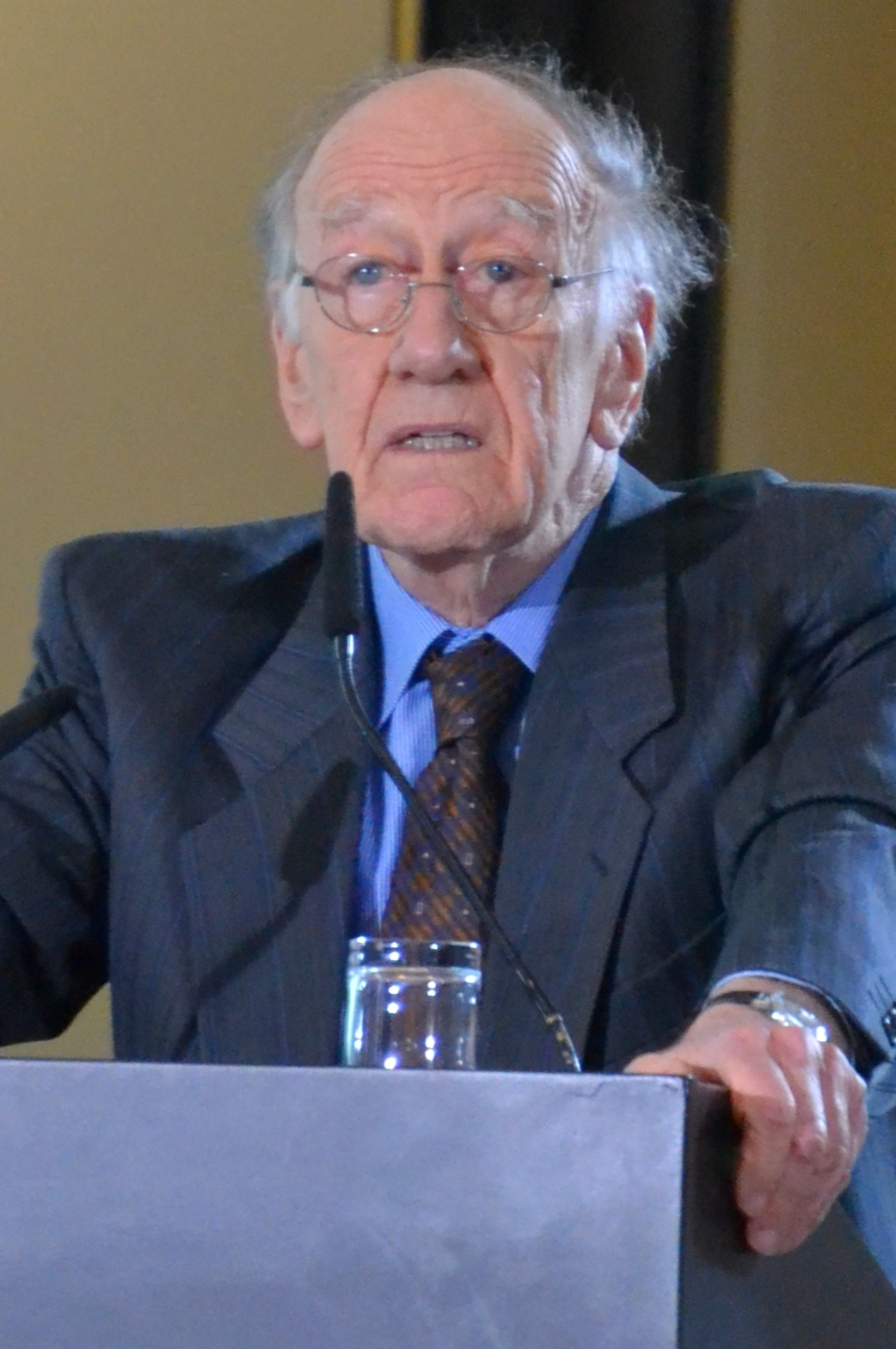
- Meier speaking at the Berlin-Brandenburg Academy of Sciences and Humanities, 2015
- Born: February 16, 1929 (age 97); Stolp, Province of Pomerania, Weimar Republic
- Board member of: Deutsche Akademie für Sprache und Dichtung
- Awards: Austrian Decoration for Science and Art; Lichtenberg Medal; Bavarian Maximilian Order for Science and Art

Academic background
- Education: Heidelberg University
- Thesis: (1956)
- Doctoral advisor: Hans Schaefer
- Other advisors: Hermann Strasburger; Matthias Gelzer
- Influences: Ernst Hohl

Academic work
- Discipline: History
- Sub-discipline: Ancient history

Christian Meier (born 16 February 1929 in Stolp in Pommern) is a German historian and professor emeritus of ancient history at LMU Munich.

In 2002, Meier was awarded the Austrian Decoration for Science and Art. He is also a member of the Norwegian Academy of Science and Letters.

== Biography ==
Meier attended high schools in Stettin, Rostock and Hamburg. In 1948, Meier passed his Abitur in Hamburg and then studied at Heidelberg University history, classical philology and Roman law. In 1956, he received his doctorate under the supervision of Hans Schaefer. He completed in 1963 his habilitation at Goethe University Frankfurt. There he was a student of Matthias Gelzer.

From 1964, he was a Privatdozent at the University of Freiburg, followed by professorships for ancient history at the University of Basel (1966), the University of Cologne (1968), and Ruhr University Bochum (1976). In 1981, he was appointed professor of "Ancient History with special reference to social and economic history" at LMU Munich, a position he held until his retirement in 1997. In the academic year 1984/1985, Meier was a Fellow at the Wissenschaftskolleg zu Berlin.

Meier was chairman of the Verbandes der Historiker Deutschlands (Association of Historians in Germany) from 1980 to 1988, and curator of the Historisches Kolleg (Historical College) in Munich from 1981 to 1995. Meier is also co-founder of the Berlin-Brandenburg Academy of Sciences and Humanities and was President of the Deutsche Akademie für Sprache und Dichtung (German Academy for Language and Poetry) in Darmstadt from 1996 to 2002. He is also a member of the Norwegian Academy of Sciences. Since 1989, he has been a full member of the Academia Europaea.

== Research ==
As a historian he has claimed to write narrative history. Meier always looks beyond the boundaries of his subject. For example, he dealt with modern democracy and the politics of the Federal Republic of Germany, especially in the course of reunification.

In 1998, he was awarded the Cicero-Rednerpreis (Cicero Speaker Prize) for his own eloquence. On the subject of spelling reform, Meier, in his role as President of the German Academy for Language and Poetry, expressed himself in a committed and critical manner. In 2003, he was awarded the Jacob-Grimm-Preis for his commitment to the German language.

In 2009 and 2015, the University of Salzburg and the University of Bern each awarded Meier an honorary doctorate.

In 2006, Meier was awarded with the Austrian Decoration for Science and Art by the Austrian Federal President Heinz Fischer. In 2009, he was awarded the Lichtenberg Medal, in 2014 the Bavarian Maximilian Order for Science and Art.

In 2015, Meier donated his private archive (manuscripts and correspondence) to the Deutsches Literaturarchiv Marbach, including correspondence with Carl Schmitt and Richard von Weizsäcker.
