= Battle of the River Amnias =

Battle

Coordinates: 40.4238°N 34.136°E

- Part of the First Mithridatic War
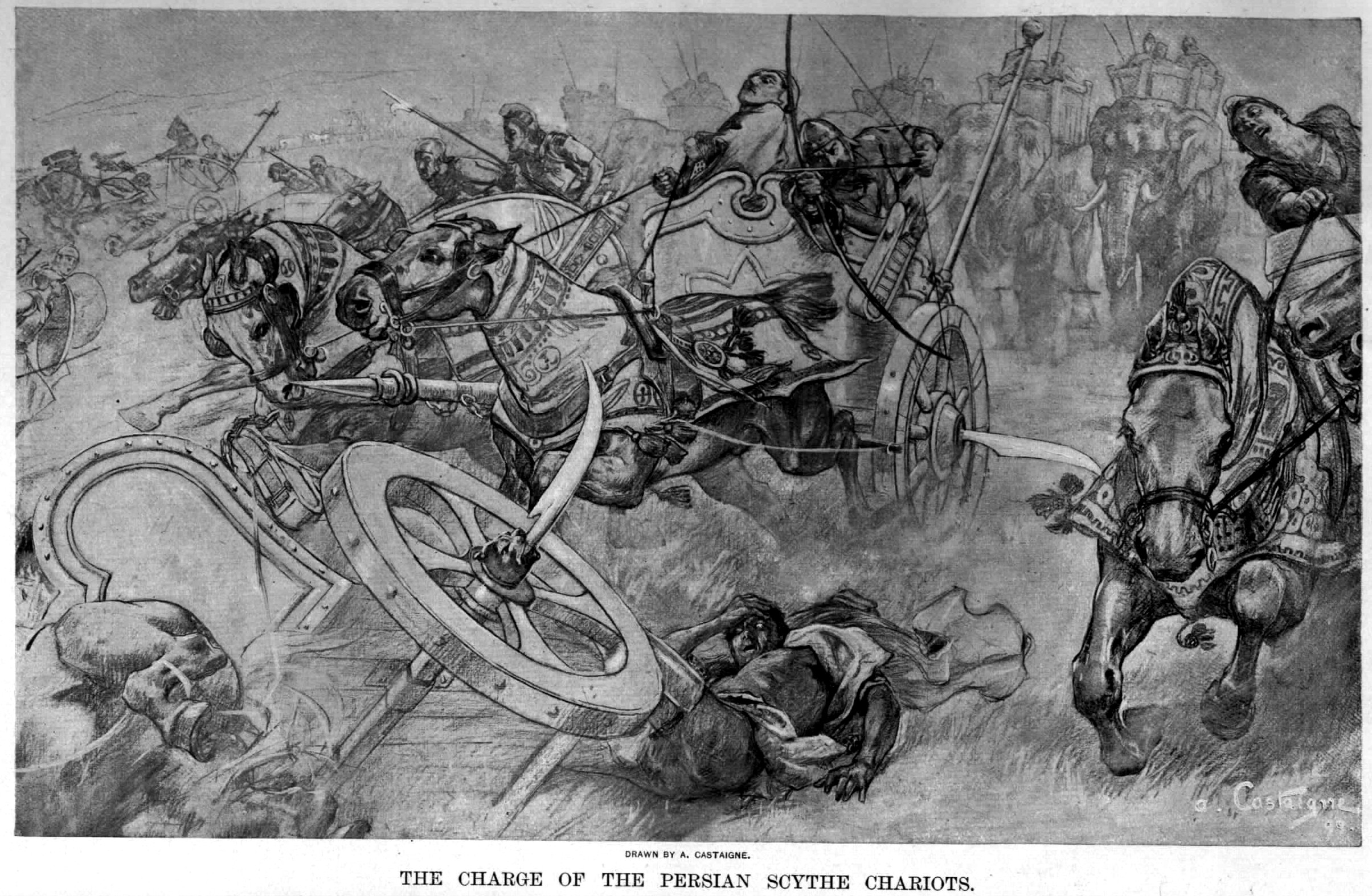
- The charge of the Persian scythed chariots at the battle of Gaugamela; illustration by Andre Castaigne (1898-1899).
Date	89 BC
Location	River Amnias (modern-day Turkey)
Result	Pontic victory

Belligerents
Pontus	Bithynia

Commanders and leaders
Archelaus; Neoptolemus	Nicomedes IV

The Battle of the River Amnias was fought in 89 BC between Mithradates VI of Pontus and Nicomedes IV of Bithynia during the First Mithridatic War. The forces of Pontus were commanded by Archelaus and Neoptolemus, while the Bithynians were led by King Nicomedes himself. Pontus was victorious. This battle and subsequent events would lead to the loss of Roman rule in the province of Asia for some years.

== Forces ==
The Pontic army was under the overall command of Mithridates, who had a force of 250,000, compared to Nicomedes, who only had 50,000 infantry and 6,000 cavalry. The Pontic advance force at the Amnias River, where this battle took place, was commanded by the brothers Neoptolemus and Archelaus, who had a force that according to Appian was outnumbered by Nicomedes, despite the size of the whole Pontic army.

== Battle ==
The Battle of the Amnias River started around a rocky hill on the plains. Neoptolemus and Archelaus, commanding the advance forces of Mithridates, sent troops forward to occupy the hill, but they were repelled by Nicomedes. Neoptolemus then led another attack on the hill, but was repelled again. Nicomedes managed to force Neoptolemus' men to retreat, but before Nicomedes could finish off Neoptolemus, he was attacked on the flank by Archelaus.

== Turning point ==
The turning point of the battle occurred when the Scythed chariots led by Archelaus dived into Nicomedes army. According to Appian, the chariots caused wounds of such a hideous nature that they caused fear and confusion among Nicomedes' troops, "...cutting some of them in two, and tearing others to pieces." So horrified was the army at the spectacle of men being cut in half while still breathing, or their mangled bodies hanging in parts on the scythes that, "overcome rather by the hideousness of the spectacle than by the loss of the fight, fear took possession of their ranks." This gave Neoptolemus time to regroup and attack what was now the rear of Nicomedes' army. Even though Archelaus and Neoptolemus now had the clear advantage, the battle did not end until Nicomedes had lost most of his army.

== Aftermath ==
The remaining survivors from Nicomedes' army fled into Paphlagonia, where they were able to join up with the Roman army under Manius Aquillius. Later in the year this combined army would be defeated by Pontic forces at the fortress of Protophachium forcing the Romans out of Asia Minor.
