= Orodaltis =

Queen of Prusias ad Mare in the first century BC

Orodaltis (Greek: Ωροδάλτις 1st century BC) was an ancient queen who may have ruled the city of Prusias ad Mare in Anatolia. She was a contemporary to the first Roman Emperor Augustus, who ruled from 27 BC to 14 AD.

== Life ==
Orodaltis is a name of Iranian origin. She was of Persian and Greek ancestry.

Orodaltis was the daughter of Lycomedes of Comana a nobleman from Bithynia who was of Cappadocian Greek descent, who was the priest of the goddess Bellona and priest-ruler of the temple-state of Comana, Cappadocia who ruled as priest-ruler from 47 BC until after 30 BC and his wife Orsabaris.

The mother of Orodaltis, Orsabaris was a princess from the Kingdom of Pontus, who was the youngest daughter born to King Mithridates VI of Pontus from an unnamed woman who was the concubine of Mithridates VI.

=== Potential reign ===
Coins minted after 72 BC have been found at the Bithynian city of Prusias ad Mare, which inscribes the names of Orodaltis and Orsabaris. The city of Prusias ad Mare was the city that the Pontian paternal ancestors of Orsabaris originated from.

An example of coinage that survives, that bears the name of Orodaltis is on one coin, on the obverse side inscribes in Greek: ΩΡΟΔΑΛΤΙΔΟΣ ΒΑΣΙΛΕΩΣ ΛΥΚΟΜΗΔΟΥΣ ΘΥΓΑΤΡΟΣ, which means of Orodaltis, daughter of King Lycomedes, showing the head of Orodaltis. On the reverse side of the coin, is inscribed in Greek: ΠΡΟΥΣΙΕΩΝ ΠΡΟΣ ΘΑΛΑΣΣΗ. The portraits on her surviving coinage shows, Orodaltis would still have been young in 22 BC and it is unlikely that she would have died before this date. Oradaltis may have been dethroned by Augustus at an unknown date during his administrative reforms of Anatolia.

The Romans had approved the status of Orodaltis and her family, as they ruled over Comana and possibly Prusias ad Mare for a substantial period. Orodaltis and her mother could be viewed as potential successors of Mithridates VI on the Pontian throne. However, the Kingdom of Pontus at the time became a Roman Client State who was ruled by her maternal uncle Pharnaces II of Pontus; the sons of Pharnaces II and eventually by Polemon I of Pontus.

== Sources ==
- A. Mayor, The Poison King: the life and legend of Mithradates, Rome's deadliest enemy, Princeton University Press, 2009
- Gabelko, Oleg L. (2009). "The Dynastic History of the Hellenistic Monarchies of Asia Minor According to the Chronography of George Synkellos". In Hojte, Jakob Munk (ed.). Mithridates VI and the Pontic Kingdom. Aarhus University Press. ISBN 978-87-7934-655-0.
