= Cleon of Gordiucome =

1st-century BC brigand-king in Asia Minor

Cleon of Gordiucome (Ancient Greek: Κλέων), or Cleon the Mysian, was a 1st-century BC brigand-king in Asia Minor.

Cleon made a reputation for himself with robbery and marauding warfare in and around Olympus, long occupying the fortress called by ancient geographers Callydium (Strabo) or Calydnium (Eustathius). He at first courted the favour of Mark Antony, and was awarded a good deal of land in exchange. In 40 BC Cleon's forces harried an invading body of Parthians led by Quintus Labienus.

Around the time of the Battle of Actium in 31 BC, Cleon switched sides to that of Octavian. In exchange for services rendered in the wars against Mark Antony, Octavian appointed Cleon the priest of the goddess Bellona in the temple-state of Comana and sovereign, therefore, of the surrounding country. Cleon added what he had been given by Octavian to what he had received from Mark Antony and styled himself a dynast. Under Octavian he also founded the city of Juliopolis out of the town of his birth, Gordiucome. Strabo mentions that Cleon was a priest of Jupiter Abrettenus and ruler of Morene, a region of Mysia noticed by no other writer.

Cleon's rule was unsuccessful and exceedingly brief; he died only one month after his appointment. In contemporary accounts, it was written that Cleon died because he ignored a taboo against eating pork in the temple precinct of Bellona.

It is sometimes recorded that Cleon succeeded Lycomedes as ruler of Comana after the very brief reign of Medeius of Comana. Strabo suggests that Medeius and Cleon are different names for the same person, the former being the Greek name, the latter the native one. Cleon was in any case succeeded by Dyteutus.
