= Gemonian stairs =

Historic location in Rome

Coordinates: 41°53′36″N 12°29′05″E

- Stairway
- Nickname: Stairs of Mourning
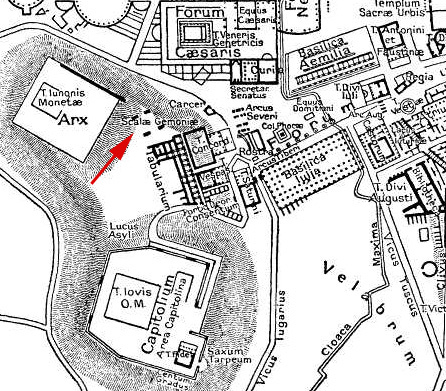
- Map of the Capitoline Hill, indicating the probable location of the Gemonian Stairs at the time of the Roman Empire.
- Interactive map of Gemonian stairs

The Gemonian Stairs (Latin: Scalae Gemoniae, Italian: Scale Gemonie) were a flight of steps located in the ancient city of Rome. Nicknamed the Stairs of Mourning, the stairs are infamous in Roman history as a place of execution.

== Location ==
The steps were situated in the central part of Rome, leading from the Arx of the Capitoline Hill down to the Roman Forum. As viewed from the Forum, they passed down the Tabularium and the Temple of Concord on the left side, and past the Mamertine Prison on the right side. It is believed that the location of the steps roughly coincides with the current Via di San Pietro in Carcere, past the ruins of the Mamertine Prison.

It is believed the stairs were built some time before the rule of Tiberius (14–37), as they were not mentioned by name in any ancient texts that predate this period. Their first use as a place of execution is primarily associated with the rumoured paranoid excesses of Tiberius' later reign.

== Executions ==
The condemned were usually strangled before their bodies were bound and desecrated. Occasionally the corpses of the executed were transferred here for display from other places of execution in Rome. Corpses were usually left to rot on the staircase for extended periods of time in full view of the Forum, scavenged by dogs or other carrion animals, until eventually being thrown into the Tiber.

Death on the stairs was considered extremely dishonourable and dreadful, yet several senators and even an emperor met their demise here. Among the most famous who were executed on this spot were the prefect of the Praetorian Guard Lucius Aelius Sejanus and the emperor Vitellius. Sejanus was a former confidant of emperor Tiberius who was implicated in a conspiracy in AD 31. According to Cassius Dio, Sejanus was strangled and cast down the Gemonian stairs, where the mob abused his corpse for three days. Soon after, his three children were similarly executed in this place.

Vitellius was a Roman general who became the third emperor in the so-called Year of the Four Emperors in AD 69. He succeeded Otho upon his suicide on 16 April, but lived to be emperor for only eight months. When his armies were defeated by those of Vespasian he agreed to surrender, but the Praetorian Guard refused to let him leave the city. On the entrance of Vespasian's troops into Rome he was dragged out of his hiding place, driven to the Gemonian stairs and struck down. His last words were "Yet I was once your Emperor".

On those same stairs, Decebalus's head was thrown along with his right hand in AD 106.

== Similar places ==
During Republican times, the Tarpeian Rock, a steep cliff at the southern summit of the Capitoline Hill, was used for similar purposes. Murderers and traitors, if convicted by the quaestores parricidii, were flung from the cliff to their deaths. Infants who suffered from significant mental or physical disabilities sometimes suffered the same fate, as they were thought to have been cursed by the gods.
