= Socrates Chrestus =

King of Bithynia

King of Bithynia
- Reign: c. 92–90 BC
- Predecessor: Nicomedes IV
- Successor: Nicomedes IV
- Born: Unknown
- Died: 90 or 89 BC
- Spouse: Orsabaris
- Father: Nicomedes III
- Mother: Hagne

Socrates Chrestus (Greek: Σωκράτης ό Χρηστός; Chrestus (The Good) died 90–88 BC) was the second son of Nicomedes III of Bithynia. He usurped the Bithynian throne by deposing his elder brother or half brother, Nicomedes IV of Bithynia.

== Life ==
There is very little information about Socrates. We have only brief references by Appian, Granius Licinianus, Justin and Memnon of Heraclea within the context of conflict in Asia Minor and military interventions in the kingdoms of Bithynia and Cappadocia by Mithridates VI, the king of Pontus.

Socrates was a second son Nicomedes III had with a concubine called Hagne who was from Cyzicus. He sent Socrates and Hagne to Cyzicus with 500 talents. He had an older half-brother named Nicomedes IV, and two younger half siblings named Nysa and Pylaemenes III.

When Nicomedes III died in 94 BC, the Roman Senate appointed Nicomedes IV to be the king of Bithynia as his successor. However, Mithridates VI, the king of Pontus, set up Socrates as a rival to Nicomedes. Mithridates gave Socrates a splendid reception and called him Chrestus (The Good). He helped Socrates to usurp the throne by giving him an army. He put Socrates on the throne even "though Socrates was of a quiet disposition and thought it right that his elder brother should reign." He then sent him to Rome to ask for his recognition as king. The Roman senate turned this down. Justin wrote that Mithridates drove Nicomedes IV out of Bithynia. He probably wrote this because it was Mithridates who engineered Socrates' usurpation. Nicomedes IV fled to Rome and asked the Romans for help. The Roman senate decreed that both Nicomedes IV and Ariobarzanes I of Cappadocia, who had been deposed and driven out of Cappadocia by Mithridates, be able to return to rule their states and commissioned Manius Aquillius and Manlius Maltinus to enforce this. The Romans' wishes prevailed, despite the opposition of Mithridates.

Manius Aquillius, with the help of Cassius, the governor of the Roman province of Asia, who recruited a large force from Galatia and Phrygia, restored both Nicomedes IV and Ariobarzanes I. According to Granius Licinianus, Socrates was not tempted by jealously to seek control of the kingdom, because he had had enough trouble from his previous adventures. These restorations are mentioned in the Periochae. An entry for Livy's book 74 records that in 88 BC "[i]n Bithynia Nicomedes was restored to the throne and Ariobarzanes in the kingdom of Cappadocia."

According to Granius Licinianus, Socrates went back to Cyzicus. He murdered his sister out of greed. Both the people of Cyzicus and Nicomedes IV pursued him and he fled to the Greek island of Euboea, where he was welcomed and hosted by a certain Cornelius, who was a Roman equite. According to Justin, Socrates was murdered by Mithridates.

== Sources ==
Primary

Appian, The Foreign Wars, Book 12, The Mithridatic Wars, CreateSpace Independent Publishing Platform, 2014; ISBN 978-1503114289

- Granius Licinianus, Grani Liciniani Quae Supersunt (Classic Reprint),Forgotten Books, 2018; ISBN 978-0428904401
- Justin, Epitome of the Philippic History of Pompeius Trogus (Classical Resources Series, No 3), Society for Classical Studies Classical Resources, Oxford University Press, U.S.A., 1994; ISBN 978-1555409517
- Memnon of Heraclea, History of Heracleia

Secondary

- Mayor, A., The Poison King: the life and legend of Mithradates, Rome’s deadliest enemy, Princeton University Press, 2009, ISBN 978-0691150260
- McGing, B.C., The foreign policy of Mithridates VI Eupator, King of Pontus, BRILL, 1986
