= Juliopolis =

Ancient and medieval city and episcopal see in Anatolia

Coordinates: 40°04′N 31°40′E

Juliopolis or Ioulioupolis (Greek: Ἰουλιούπολις), occasionally also Heliopolis (Ἡλιούπολις), was an ancient and medieval city and episcopal see in Anatolia (modern Turkey). In later Byzantine times, it also bore the name Basilaion (Βασιλαίον). Various authors assign it to the regions of Galatia, Bithynia, and Paphlagonia. Now, it is in the province of Ankara, Nallıhan.

== History ==
Archaeological evidence at the site points to settlement since prehistoric times. The town was originally known as Gordiou Kome (Γορδίου Κώμη, "village of Gordion"). Cleon of Gordiucome, a native of the town, raised its status to a city and renamed it as Juliopolis in honour of the Emperor Augustus. Augustus had rewarded him with the sovereignty over Comana (Cappadocia) for his services in war against Mark Antony, whom Cleon had earlier served and from whom he had received other lands.

In late antiquity, the town gained in prominence due to its location on the so-called "Pilgrim Road" that connected Constantinople with Ancyra. It is attested as a bishopric since the Council of Ancyra in 314. Emperor Justinian I (r. 527–565) undertook repairs to strengthen the city walls, that were being undermined by the nearby Skopas river (modern Aladağ Cayı). In late antiquity, the city belonged to the province of Galatia Prima, and later to the Bucellarian Theme.

In ca. 880 the city changed its name again to Basilaion (Βασιλαίον), Basileon (Βασιλέον) or Basileion (Βασίλειον) in honour of the Emperor Basil I (r. 867–886), and a late document of the Byzantine Church refers to it by its original name of Γορδίου Κώμη. Symeon the New Theologian was born in Basileion in 949 AD. Emperor Constantine X Doukas (r. 1059–1067) raised the see to the rank of a metropolis (without suffragans) in order to honour its incumbent bishop, later confirmed by Michael VII Doukas (r. 1071–1078). Although intended as temporary, the rank was retained, despite the protestations of Nicetas, Metropolitan of Ancyra, to Emperor Alexios I Komnenos (r. 1081–1118).

The site of the city has been securely identified thanks to the preservation of milestones with the inscription Iuliopolis, from the Roman road connecting Nicaea with Ancyra. The western parts of the site now lie submerged in the Sarıyar Dam reservoir, as well as the nearby Byzantine-era bridge (Sarılar Köprüsü) over the Skopas river.

There have been found 671 graves in the Necropolis. A total of 71 of the graves were damaged, Which 37 by antique robbers, and 34 by smugglers. Also, numerous belongings being Jewelry, metal and ceramic pots, mirrors, smell bottles and coins were found during the excavations.

=== Bishops ===
A few of the bishops of Juliopolis/Basilaion are known:

- Philadelphus, attended the Council of Ancyra (314) and the First Council of Nicaea (325)
- Philetus, who signed the acts of the Eastern bishops at the Council of Serdica (343)
- Meliphthongus, attended the Council of Chalcedon (451)
- Proclianus, signed in 458 the letter of the bishops of Galatia Prima to Emperor Leo I the Thracian
- Pantoleon, attended a council at Constantinople (536)
- Martyrius, attended the Third Council of Constantinople (680)
- John, attended the Quinisext Council (692)
- Constantine, attended the Second Council of Nicaea (787)
- Ignatius, attended the Council of Constantinople in 869/870
- Synetus, Metropolitan (possibly the first), addressee of Michael Psellos (mid-11th century)

== Catholic titular see ==
The diocese was nominally restored in the 18th century as a Latin Church titular bishopric by the Catholic Church. It has had following incumbents:

- Michał Jan Zienkowicz (27 June 1718 – 2 October 1730)
- Józef Michał Trzciński (21 July 1732 – 3 January 1738, died)
- Jean de Lolière-Puycontat, M.E.P. (28 August 1738 – 8 December 1755, died)
- Franciscus Kornis de Göncz-Ruszka (12 June 1769 – 12 February 1790, died)
- Joseph Norbert Provencher (1 February 1820 – 4 June 1847)
- Antoine-Magloire Doumer, SS.CC. (9 May 1848 – 24 Dec 1878, died)
- Sylwester Sembratowicz (Sembratovyc) (28 February 1879 – 27 Mar 1885)
- George Vincent King, O.P. (11 September 1885 – 25 February 1886, died)
- Andrea Logorezzi (7 January 1887 – 15 June 1888)
- Anton Hubert Fischer (14 February 1889 – 14 February 1903)
- Bonaventure Finbarr Francis Broderick (16 September 1903 – 17 November 1943, died)
- René-Joseph Piérard (29 December 1945 – 9 January 1948)
- Ioan Maria Duma, O.F.M. Conv. (16 November 1948 – 16 July 1981, died)

== Sources ==
- Belke, Klaus (1984). Tabula Imperii Byzantini, Band 4: Galatien und Lykaonien (in German). Vienna: Verlag der Österreichischen Akademie der Wissenschaften. ISBN 978-3-7001-0634-0.
