= Adiatorix =

1st-century BC Galatian priest and ruler of Comana in Cappadocia

Adiatorix (Ancient Greek: Ἀδιατόριξ) was the son of Domneclius (or Domnilaus), tetrarch of the Trocmi in Galatia. Cicero reports that he was a high priest in 50 BC, and scholars have reckoned him an adherent of Deiotarus. He belonged to Mark Antony's party, and was put in charge of Heraclea Pontica by him. Shortly before the Battle of Actium in 31, Adiatorix had all the Roman colonists in Heracleia put to death. He claimed he had been given permission to do so by Mark Antony, but modern writers consider this doubtful. After this battle he was led as prisoner in the triumph of Augustus, and put to death with his younger son. His elder son, Dyteutus, was subsequently made priest of Bellona in Comana, and therefore ruler of that territory.
