= Nicomedes IV of Bithynia =

King of Bithynia (94–74 BC)

Nicomedes IV Philopator
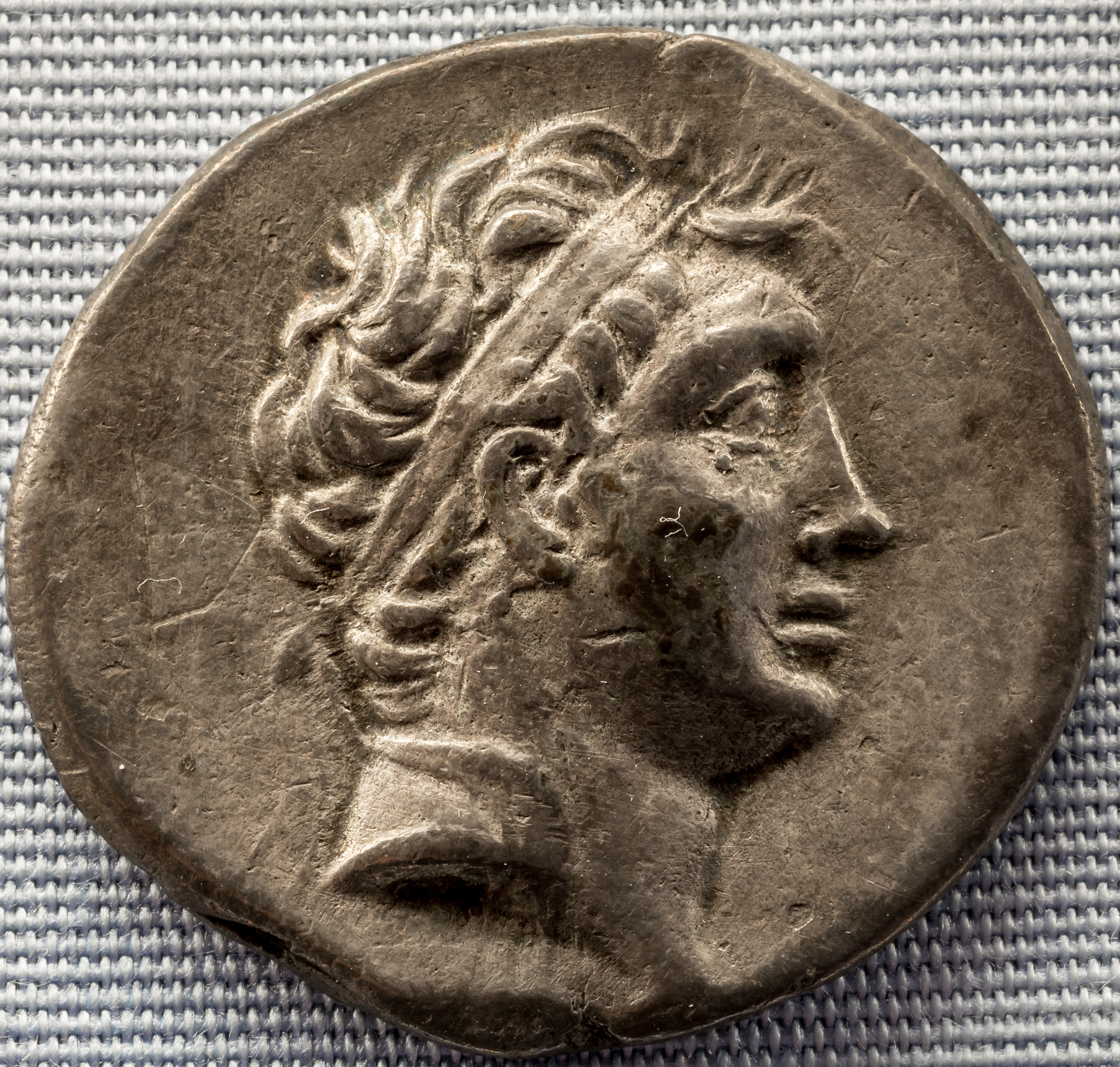
- Nicomedes IV depicted on a silver coin

King of Bithynia
- Reign: c. 94–92 BC
- Predecessor: Nicomedes III
- Successor: Socrates Chrestus
- Reign: c. 90–74 BC (Note: absent from 88 to 84 BC)
- Predecessor: Socrates Chrestus
- Successor: Monarchy Abolished
- Died: 74 BC
- Spouse: Nysa
- Issue: Nysa
- Father: Nicomedes III
- Mother: Nysa or Aristonica

Nicomedes IV Philopator (Ancient Greek: Νικομήδης Φιλοπάτωρ) was the last king of Bithynia from c. 94 BC to 74 BC. He was the first son and successor of Nicomedes III of Bithynia.

== Life ==
Memnon of Heraclea wrote that Nicomedes IV was the son of Nicomedes III by his wife Nysa, but according to Granius Licinianus he was a son of Nicomedes III by a first wife called Aristonica, who Granius Licinianus claims died nine days after his birth. He had three half siblings, Nysa by his father's second marriage to Nysa, and a half brother named Socrates Chrestus from his father's concubine, Hagne, and possibly Pylaemenes III by an unknown woman.

His reign began at the death of his father. The first few years of his kingship were relatively peaceful, but soon King Mithridates VI of Pontus (the maternal grand-uncle of Nicomedes IV), one of Rome's greatest enemies during the late Republic, began harassing Bithynia's borders.

Nicomedes IV's brother, Socrates Chrestus, assisted by Mithridates VI, defeated Nicomedes IV's army in 90 BC, and Nicomedes IV was forced to flee to Italy. He was restored to his throne by Manius Aquillius due to Rome's influence in the region. However, Aquillius encouraged Nicomedes IV to raid Mithridates VI's territory, prompting Mithridates VI to retaliate again in 88 BC. Nicomedes IV fled once again to Rome. Mithridates invaded and conquered Bithynia and the Roman provinces of Asia, starting the First Mithridatic War.

The East was seen by the Romans as a province providing an abundance of gold and silver. As such, two powerful Romans, Gaius Marius and the consul Lucius Cornelius Sulla aimed at a command in the region. After marching on Rome and outlawing Marius, Sulla sailed east and fought Mithridates VI on several occasions over the next three years, and finally in 85 BC, Mithridates VI sued for peace, and was allowed to retain his kingship in Pontus after paying a heavy fine.

Nicomedes IV was restored to his throne in Bithynia in 84 BC. The years that followed were relatively peaceful, though Bithynia came more and more under the control of Rome. In 80 BC, young Gaius Julius Caesar was an ambassador to Nicomedes IV's court. Caesar was sent to raise a fleet using Bithynia's resources, but he remained so long with the King that a rumor of a sexual relationship between the two men surfaced, leading to the disparaging title for Caesar, "the Queen of Bithynia", an appellation which Caesar's political enemies made use of later in his life. During Caesar's Gallic Triumph a popular verse began: "Gallias Caesar subegit, Caesarem Nicomedes," (Caesar laid the Gauls low, Nicomedes laid Caesar low), suggesting that Caesar was the submissive receiving partner in the relationship. It is unknown if a sexual relationship existed or was only a story told by his opponents, and Caesar vigorously denied its truthfulness.

As one of his last acts as king of Bithynia, in 74 BC, Nicomedes IV bequeathed the entire Kingdom of Bithynia to Rome. The Roman Senate quickly voted it as a new province. Rome's old enemy Mithridates VI of Pontus had other plans for Bithynia, however, and Nicomedes IV's death and bequeathal led directly to the Third Mithridatic War.

== See also ==
- Attalus III
- Young Caesar (opera)

== Notes ==
Regnal titles
Preceded by Nicomedes III	King of Bithynia; 94–74 BC	Annexation by Roman Republic
