= Matthias Gelzer =

Swiss-German classical historian (1886–1974)

- Born: 19 December 1886; Liestal, Switzerland
- Died: 23 July 1974 (aged 87); Frankfurt am Main, West Germany

Academic background
- Education: University of Basel; University of Leipzig; University of Freiburg
- Thesis: Studien zur byzantinischen Verwaltung Ägyptens (1909)
- Doctoral advisor: Ulrich Wilcken

Matthias Gelzer (19 December 1886, Liestal – 23 July 1974, Frankfurt am Main) was a Swiss-German classical historian, known for his studies of the Roman Republic in regard to its politics and society. He was the author of highly regarded biographies on Julius Caesar, Pompey and Cicero.

He studied history and classical philology at the universities of Basel and Leipzig, where in 1909 he received his doctorate as a student of Ulrich Wilcken. In 1912 he obtained his habilitation at the University of Freiburg with a thesis on the nobility of the Roman Republic. In 1915 he became a professor of ancient history at the University of Greifswald, and in 1918 relocated as a professor to the University of Strasbourg. From 1919 to 1955 he was a professor of ancient history at the University of Frankfurt am Main, where he served as its rector in 1924/25.

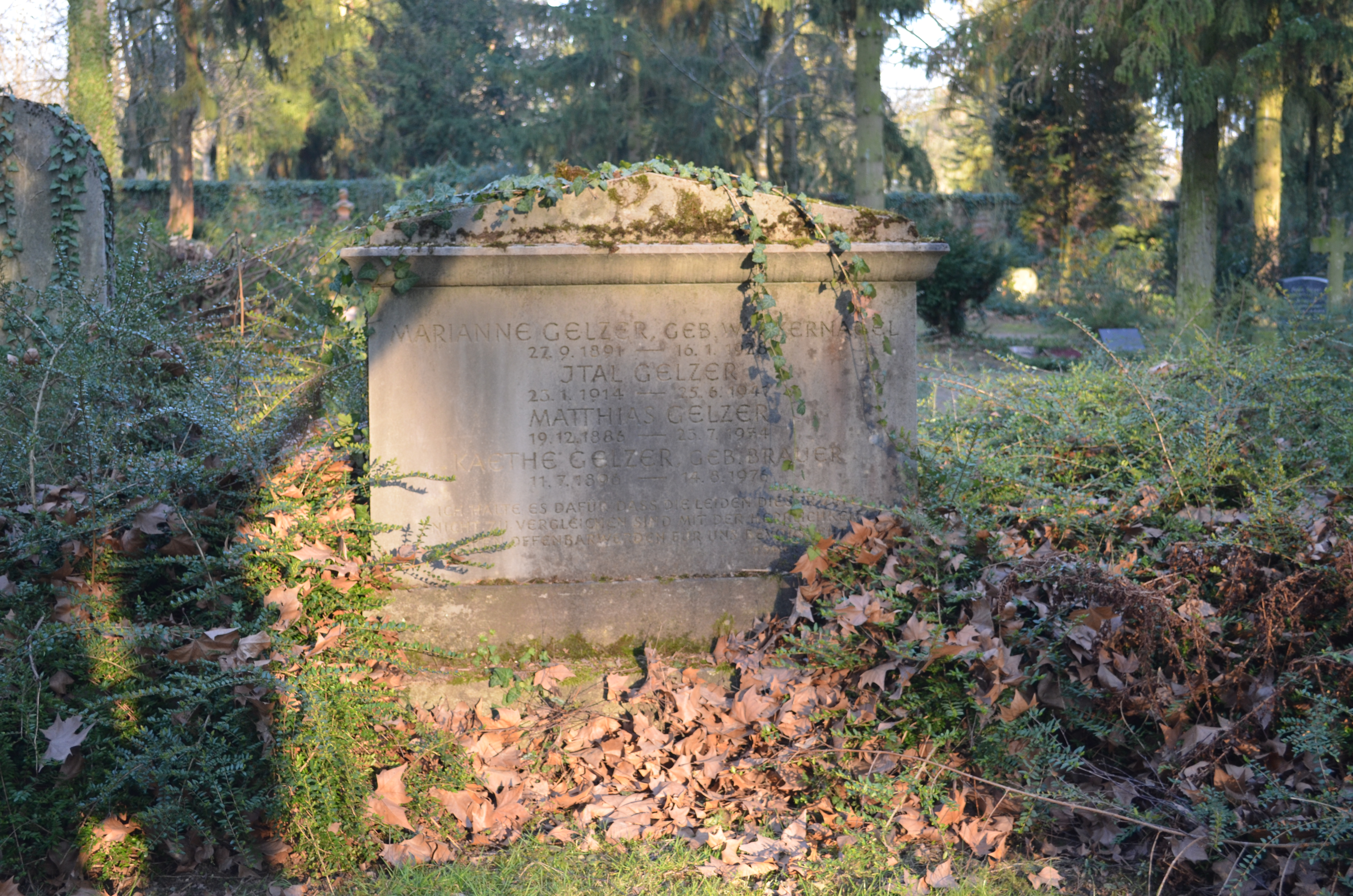
Gravesite of Matthias Gelzer at the Hauptfriedhof Frankfurt.

== Selected works ==
- Studien zur byzantinischen Verwaltung Ägyptens, 1909 – Studies on Byzantine-administered Egypt.
- Die Nobilität der römischen Republik, 1912 – Nobility of the Roman Republic,
- Die Nobilität der Kaiserzeit, 1915 – Nobility of the Empire.
- Caesar, der Politiker und Staatsmann, 1921, translated into English and published in 1968 as "Caesar: politician and statesman".
- Vom römischen Staat; zur Politik und Gesellschaftgeschichte der römischen Republik, 1944 – The Roman state. Politics and social history of the Roman Republic.
- Pompeius, 1949 – Biography of Pompey.
- Cicero; ein biographischer Versuch, 1969 – Biography of Cicero.

From 1925 to 1962 he was on the editorial board of the journal "Gnomon", for which he contributed numerous reviews. He was also the author of several entries in the Pauly-Wissowa "Realencyclopädie der classischen Altertumswissenschaft".
